= Scaled =

Scaled may mean:

- Scaled Composites (often abbreviated as Scaled), formerly the Rutan Aircraft Factory
- Scaled Aviation Industries of Lahore, Pakistan, a Light Sports Aircraft Manufacturer
- Something which has undergone a scale transformation
  - Scale model#Scales
  - Scaling (geometry)

== See also ==
- Scale (disambiguation)
