= Scaling =

Scaling may refer to:

== Science and technology ==
=== Mathematics and physics ===
- Scaling (geometry), a linear transformation that enlarges or diminishes objects
- Scale invariance, a feature of objects or laws that do not change if scales of length, energy, or other variables are multiplied by a common factor
  - Scaling law, a law that describes the scale invariance found in many natural phenomena
- The scaling of critical exponents in physics, such as Widom scaling, or scaling of the renormalization group

=== Computing and information technology ===
- Feature scaling, a method used to standardize the range of independent variables or features of data
- Image scaling, the resizing of an image
- Multidimensional scaling, a means of visualizing the level of similarity of individual cases of a dataset
- Scalability, a computer or network's ability to function as the amount of data or number of users increases
- Scaling along the Z axis, a technique used in computer graphics for a pseudo-3D effect
- Reduced scales of semiconductor device fabrication processes (the ability of a technology to scale to a smaller process)
- Scaling up a neural network to increase performance; see Neural scaling law

=== Other uses in science and technology ===
- Tooth scaling, in dentistry, the removal of plaque and calculus
- Fouling, i.e., formation of a deposit layer (scale) on a solid surface, e.g., in a boiler; in particular, a kind of micro fouling as crystallization of salts
- Scaling rock, the removal of loose rock from a rock wall after blasting
- Scaling of innovations, a process that leads to widespread use of an innovation

== Other uses ==
- Scaling, North Yorkshire, England
- Climbing
- Card throwing, known in magic circles as scaling
- Scaling fish, the removal of fish scales from the fish

== See also ==
- Scale (disambiguation)
- Scaling function (disambiguation)
- Homogeneous function, used for scaling extensive properties in thermodynamic equations
