= Scale (chemistry) =

The scale of a chemical process refers to the rough ranges in mass or volume of a chemical reaction or process that define the appropriate category of chemical apparatus and equipment required to accomplish it, and the concepts, priorities, and economies that operate at each. While the specific terms used—and limits of mass or volume that apply to them—can vary between specific industries, the concepts are used broadly across industry and the fundamental scientific fields that support them. Use of the term "scale" is unrelated to the concept of weighing; rather it is related to cognate terms in mathematics (e.g., geometric scaling, the linear transformation that enlarges or shrinks objects, and scale parameters in probability theory), and in applied areas (e.g., in the scaling of images in architecture, engineering, cartography, etc.).

Practically speaking, the scale of chemical operations also relates to the training required to carry them out, and can be broken out roughly as follows:

- procedures performed at the laboratory scale, which involve the sorts of procedures used in academic teaching and research laboratories in the training of chemists and in discovery chemistry venues in industry,
- operations at the pilot plant scale, e.g., carried out by process chemists, which, though at the lowest extreme of manufacturing operations, are on the order of 200- to 1000-fold larger than laboratory scale, and used to generate information on the behavior of each chemical step in the process that might be useful to design the actual chemical production facility;
- intermediate bench scale sets of procedures, 10- to 200-fold larger than the discovery laboratory, sometimes inserted between the preceding two;
- operations at demonstration scale and full-scale production, whose sizes are determined by the nature of the chemical product, available chemical technologies, the market for the product, and manufacturing requirements, where the aim of the first of these is literally to demonstrate operational stability of developed manufacturing procedures over extended periods (by operating the suite of manufacturing equipment at the feed rates anticipated for commercial production).

For instance, the production of the streptomycin-class of antibiotics, which combined biotechnologic and chemical operations, involved use of a 130,000 liter fermenter, an operational scale approximately one million-fold larger than the microbial shake flasks used in the early laboratory scale studies.

As noted, nomenclature can vary between manufacturing sectors; some industries use the scale terms pilot plant and demonstration plant interchangeably.

Apart from defining the category of chemical apparatus and equipment required at each scale, the concepts, priorities and economies that obtain, and the skill-sets needed by the practicing scientists at each, defining scale allows for theoretical work prior to actual plant operations (e.g., defining relevant process parameters used in the numerical simulation of large-scale production processes), and allows economic analyses that ultimately define how manufacturing will proceed.

Besides the chemistry and biology expertises involved in scaling designs and decisions, varied aspects of process engineering and mathematical modeling, simulations, and operations research are involved.

== See also ==
- Medicinal chemistry
- Process chemistry
- Pilot plant
- Chemical engineering
- Process engineering
- Operations research
