= Ecologically based invasive plant management =

Ecologically based invasive plant management (EBIPM) is a decision-making framework to improve the management of invasive plant species. When land managers are faced with infestations of invasive plants, a step by step framework to develop integrated management plans will improve their success at managing these plants. EBIPM is founded on the principles of ecology to manage invasive weed infestations and restore landscapes. The framework combines an ecosystem health assessment (Rangeland Health Assessment), a method to recognize how ecological processes affect causes of succession, ecological principles to guide the choices of tools and strategies to manage invasive plants and how to use adaptive management to generate a step-by-step decision model. The focus of EBIPM is to encourage managers to move away from simply killing the weeds and move toward management efforts that repair the underlying causes of invasion.

EBIPM guides users through a 5-step process that begins with (step 1) an assessment of rangeland health to (step 2) determine why invasive species are present and what ecological processes are in need of repair. Managers can then (step 3) use ecological principles as targets to (step 4) choose the appropriate tools and strategies that will give them the best chances of successful and lasting results. The final step in the EBIPM process is to use adaptive management to design and implement a management plan.

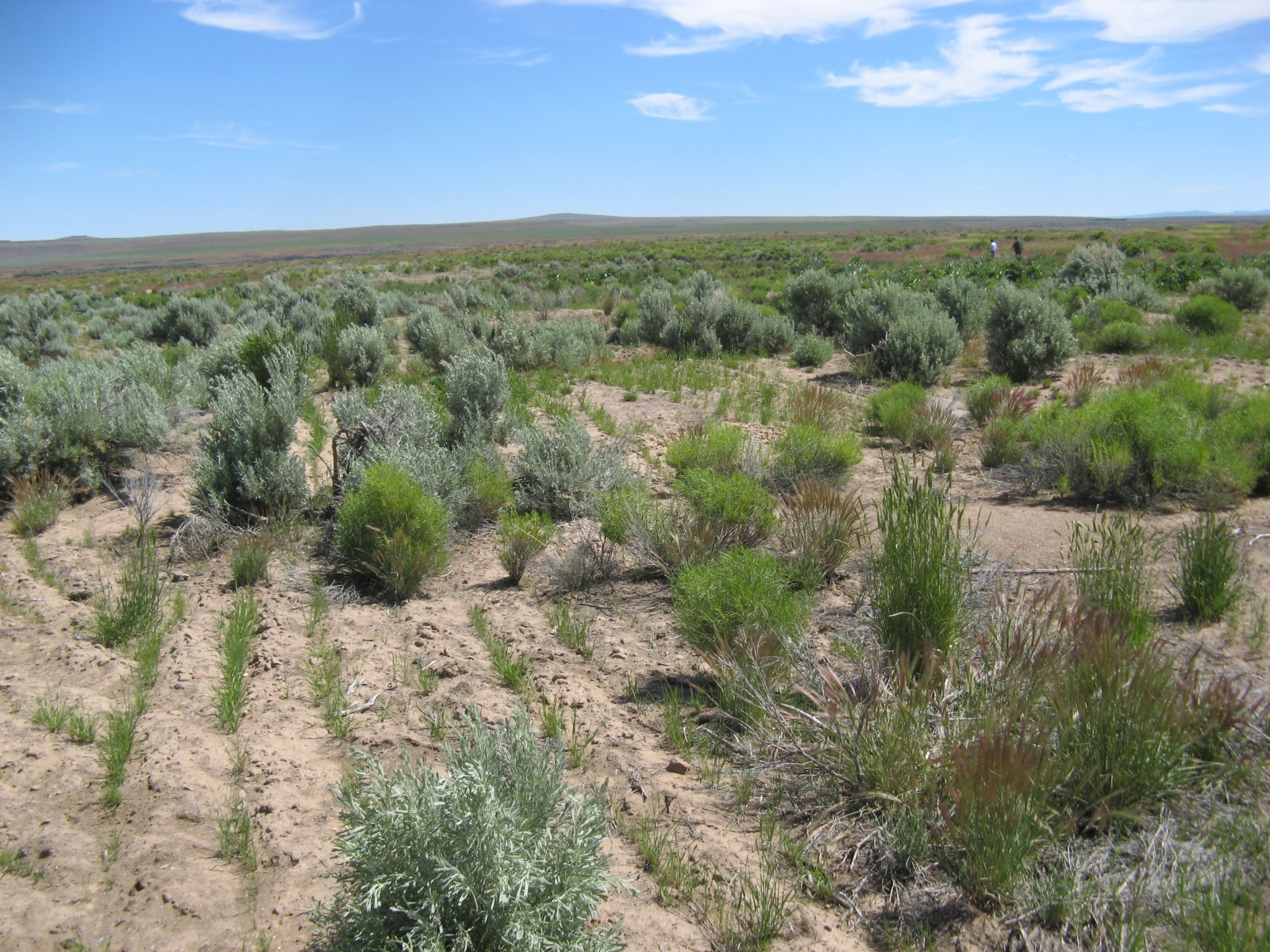
EBIPM restoration efforts in eastern Oregon.

== Background ==
Land managers have historically used one or more of a number of strategies to treat rangelands dominated by invasive plants. Treatments may have included the use of herbicides, targeted grazing, seeding, controlled burning, biological controls, and any number of other rangeland management treatments. The problem with simply applying treatments is that, while initially weeds are controlled, the treatment does not fix the underlying cause of the problem and the invasive species, more often than not, grow again within a short period of time. The main reason for re-occurring weed infestations is that just applying treatments to control the weeds will likely have little-to-no influence on the ecological processes driving plant community change. The EBIPM framework employs ecological principles and the practices land managers have experience in using to mend actual ecological processes that are in disrepair. This strategy has proven to provide more successful and sustainable invasive plant management.
EBIPM is based on ecological succession which was originally theorized by Frederic Clements and explains the concept of plant community change over time. Steward T. A. Pickett furthered the theory into successional management by developing a hierarchical model that includes the causes for plant community change, the controlling ecological processes, and their modifying factors. This model for successional management proposes three general causes of plant community change: site availability, species availability, and species performance.

== Site Availability ==
Site availability refers primarily to the availability of safe sites, or open niches, in the soil profile Safe sites, spots in the soil where a seed can germinate, emerge, establish, and flourish, are created through the process of disturbance, which is a temporary variation in the typical environmental conditions which often significantly affects and alters an ecosystem. Examples of disturbance include human disruption such as recreation, construction, or fire and it also occurs naturally through wildfire, flood, insect infestation, animal activity and other processes including variations in weather. Disturbances create openings for new or different plants which changes the natural succession of a plant community. Disturbance also lessens the competitive intensity between plants, changes conditions in the environment, and alters the supply rates of resources. Understanding site availability creates an opportunity for land managers to direct plant communities in a desired direction by manipulating disturbances to favor desired species. Applying ecological principles related to the process of disturbance can significantly impact and promote germination, establishment, and growth of native and desired species over invasive species.

== Species Availability ==
Species availability relates directly to the ecological processes of reproduction and dispersal, in other words, the availability of species through propagules either present in the soil seedbank or brought in by dispersal Essentially, species availability is the presence and establishment of various species. Seeds have developed a number of adaptations and are dispersed through various methods including wind, water, barbs, hooks, and awns that stick to animals and clothing, are carried in the wind or water...etc.
Typically, invasive species produce more seeds relative to desired native species often giving the invasive species a competitive advantage. Managers can shift competitive balance back to desired or native species by increasing their reproductive capacity and density (adding seeds...seeding treatment), which can lead to higher densities of desired species. This is often enough for desired plants to swing the competitive balance back to their favor.

== Species Performance ==
Species Performance is how well a given species can perform in diverse environmental conditions based on a range of ecological processes including a species' ability to capture and use resources to survive and increase or spread in the environment despite competition, stress, and interference.
The factors defining a given species' ability to survive and thrive in a number of different environmental conditions are:

1. resource availability and a species' ability to acquire and utilize those resources
2. response to environment or a plant's ability adapt to changes in environmental conditions (also called ecophysiological plant traits)
3. life strategy or a plant's life history strategy and the associated trade-offs influencing the survival or death of a species
4. stress and the ability of a species to either avoid or tolerate stress, and
5. interference or the level at which a plant is influenced by nearby plants of differing species.

Most invasive species are efficient at taking advantage of extra resources if they become available through disturbance or some other process. This information can be critical to promoting desired species as land managers attempt to give desired species a competitive edge by manipulating the factors influencing how a species performs.

== Steps ==
The EBIPM model is a five-step comprehensive decision tool designed to improve land management decision-making and increase success rates of invasive species management. In fact, one study showed the EBIPM approach improves the likelihood of success by up to 67% relative to traditional management strategies. This article merely provides a list of the steps. For a more comprehensive look at the EBIPM framework, see the external links section below.

== Step 1: Complete a Rangeland Health Assessment ==
A fundamental element of land management is to evaluate the current condition of the land and learn what ecological processes needs to be fixed. One such evaluation or rangeland health assessment, Interpreting Indicators of Rangeland Health, is currently being adopted or implemented by most U.S. government agencies as protocol. In the EBIPM framework, this step identifies the ecological processes in need of repair.
The Bureau of Land Management offers comprehensive trainings on Interpreting Indicators of Rangeland Health and the EBIPM Assessment Guidelines provide an in-depth, how-to guide for completing an assessment as part of the first step of the EBIPM process.

== Step 2: Identify Causes of Invasion and Associated Processes Not Functioning ==
The assessment mentioned in the previous section provides the information for what the current conditions are and EBIPM can inform why those conditions exist and what causes of plant community change/succession and associated processes are not functioning. EBIPM's focus shifts management from trying to kill the weeds to directing the processes driving the three causes of plant community change. This will lead to more predictable and sustainable transitions toward a desired ecosystem.

== Step 3: Use Principles to Guide Decision Making ==
The EBIPM framework is built on the idea tools and strategies are more successful and sustainable when the scientific principles of ecology are considered during the decision-making process. This makes Step 3, and the ecological principles for managing succession, a critical component of the EBIPM process. The ecological principles that provide direction for management were developed from existing scientific literature and are aimed at improving management by providing maximum plant diversity and maximum biomass in the ecosystem. Land managers face difficult decisions in trying to successfully repair and restore complex ecological processes and they often rely solely on their own intuition and experience to determine the tools and strategies they will use. Through the EBIPM approach, land managers combine their knowledge and experience with established ecological principles to choose the best management tools and strategies for dealing with complex problems. This provides an obvious benefit in that the proven scientific knowledge is organized into a functional listing of principles land managers can use to help guide their decision-making.

== Step 4: Choose Appropriate Tools and Strategies Based on Principles ==
The EBIPM framework links the ecological processes driving plant community change with the ecological principles to provide the scientific knowledge about how the processes work and the practices affecting the most positive changes on the land. These principles provide managers an increased understanding of ecosystem processes and the ability to predict outcomes in a variety of situations. The principles can also help managers to understand how processes in need of repair may be to blame for driving successional patterns in an undesired direction toward the increased presence of invasive plants. This produces a more informed base for land managers to use in decision-making.

== Step 5: Design and Execute a Plan Using Adaptive Management ==
Developing rangeland management plans can be difficult and extremely unpredictable but the EBIPM process provides managers a method to work through both of these challenges. However, outcomes and the true effectiveness of management is virtually impossible to predict because of the complexity of any given rangeland ecosystem and the number of variables acting on the system. To combat this, the EBIPM process includes adaptive management which empowers managers to learn by doing in the face of uncertainty. Adaptive management sets treatments up using experimental design so managers can test various management options and see what works best on their land and in their situation.

== See also ==
- invasive plants
- weeds
- adaptive management
- conservation ecology
- decision theory
- ecology
- Invasive Species Forecasting System

== Associated EBIPM Videos ==
- Implementing EBIPM: Science-Driven Invasive Plant Management
- Implementing EBIPM In the Field: tackling invasive plants with science-based solutions
- A Working Ranch with an effective medusahead management program
