= Scaly =

Scaly may refer to:

- something with the appearance of a scale
- Scaly-breasted lorikeet (Trichoglossus chlorolepidotus), a bird species found in woodland in eastern Australia

== See also ==
- Scale (disambiguation)
