= Separation and Purification Technology =

Academic Journal

- Discipline: Process chemistry, materials science, filtration, separation
- Language: English
- Edited by: Bart Van der Bruggen

Publication details
- Former names: Separations Technology, Gas Separation and Purification
- History: 1997–present
- Publisher: Elsevier
- Impact factor: 9.0 (2024)

Standard abbreviations
- ISO 4: Sep. Purif. Technol.

Indexing
- ISSN: 1383-5866 (print); 1873-3794 (web)

Links
- Journal homepage

Separation and Purification Technology is a peer-reviewed scientific journal published by Elsevier, covering methods for separation and purification in chemical and environmental engineering, including research on the separation and purification of liquids, vapors, and gases, as well as carbon capture and separation, excluding methods intended for analytical purposes, soil science, polymer science, and metallurgy. The editor-in-chief is Bart Van der Bruggen (KU Leuven). According to the Journal Citation Reports the journal has a 2024 impact factor of 9.0.
