= Invasive species =

Introduced species that harms its new environment

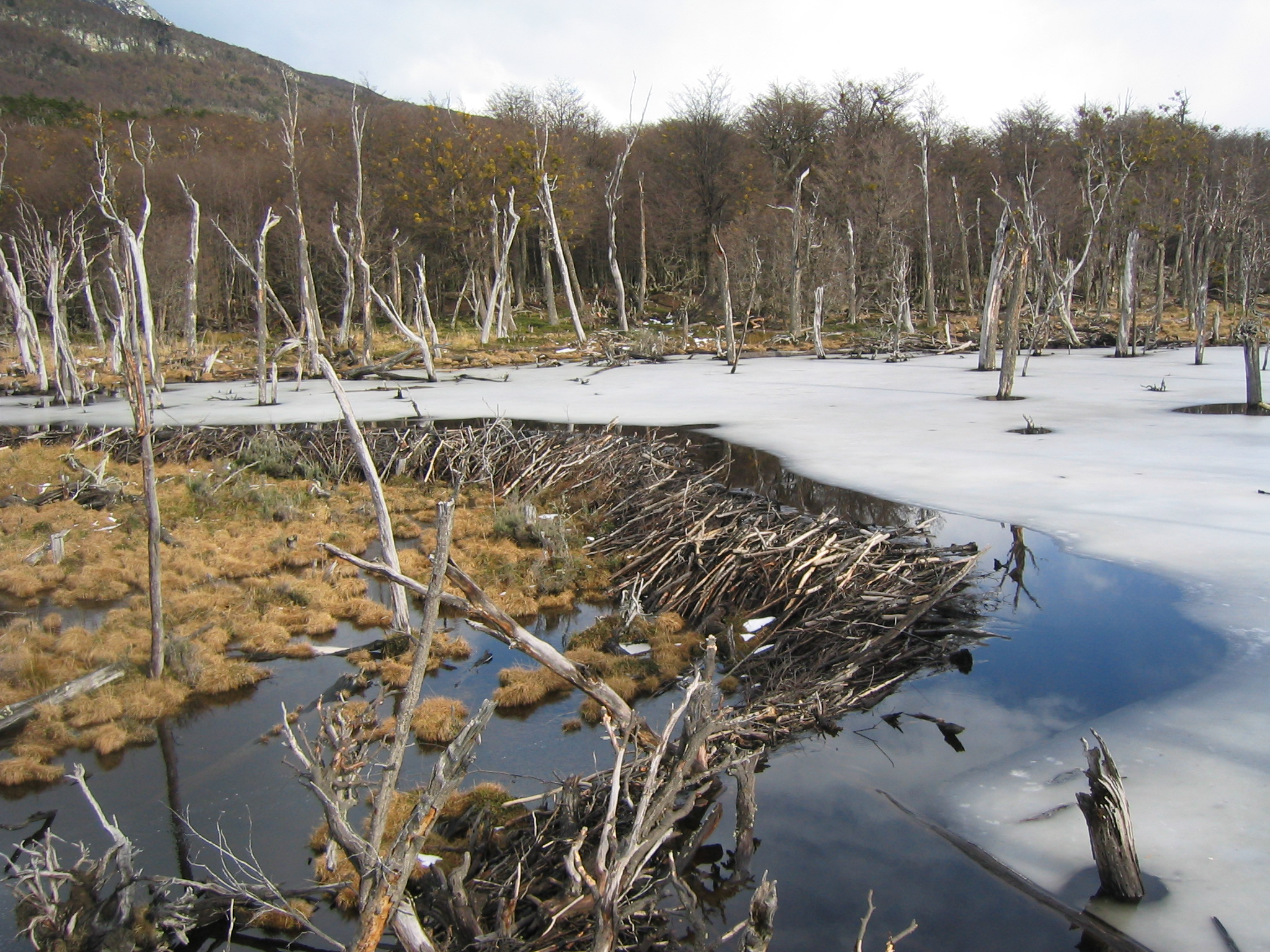
North American beaver (Castor canadensis) dam in Tierra del Fuego

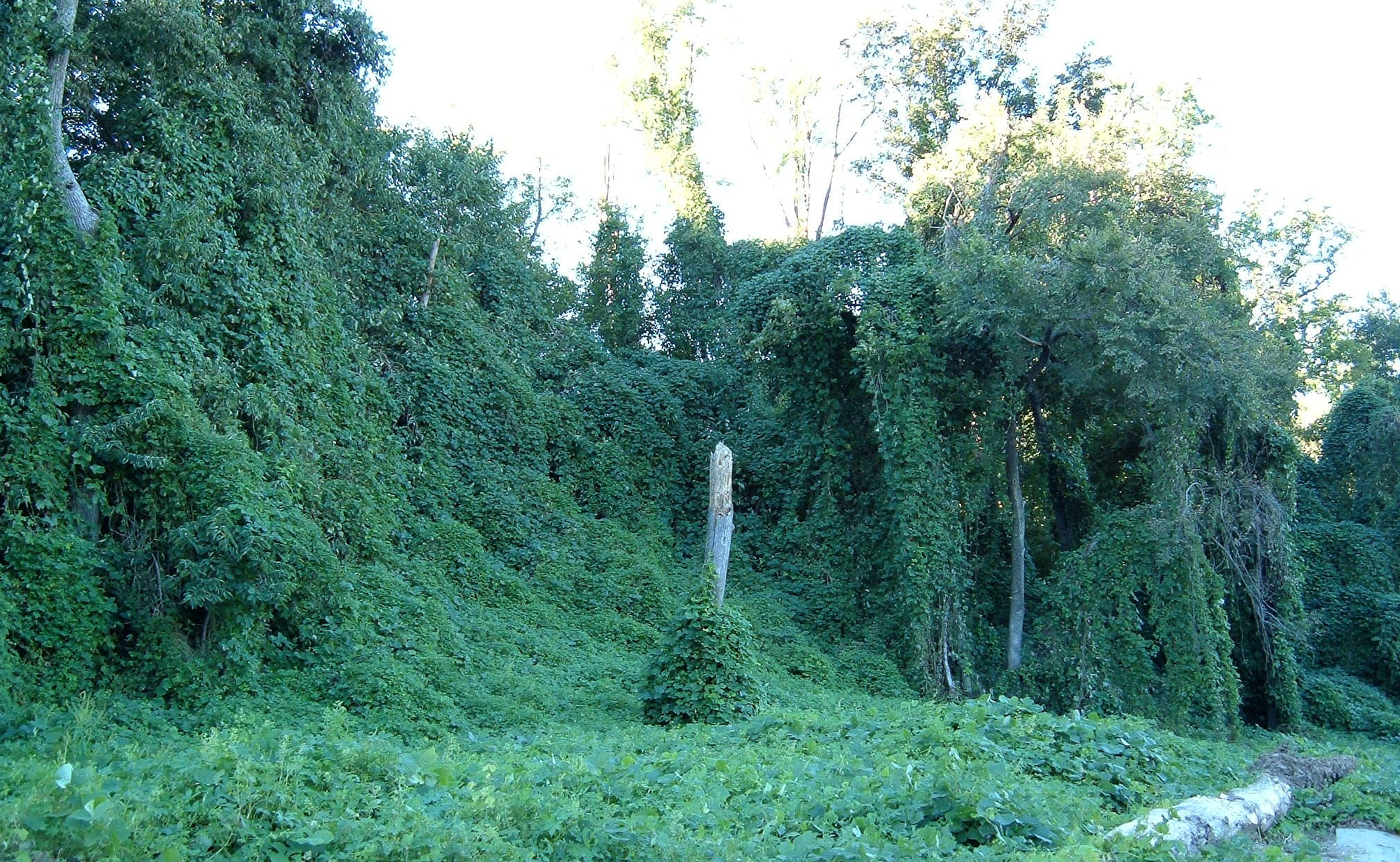
Kudzu growing over and smothering trees in Atlanta, Georgia

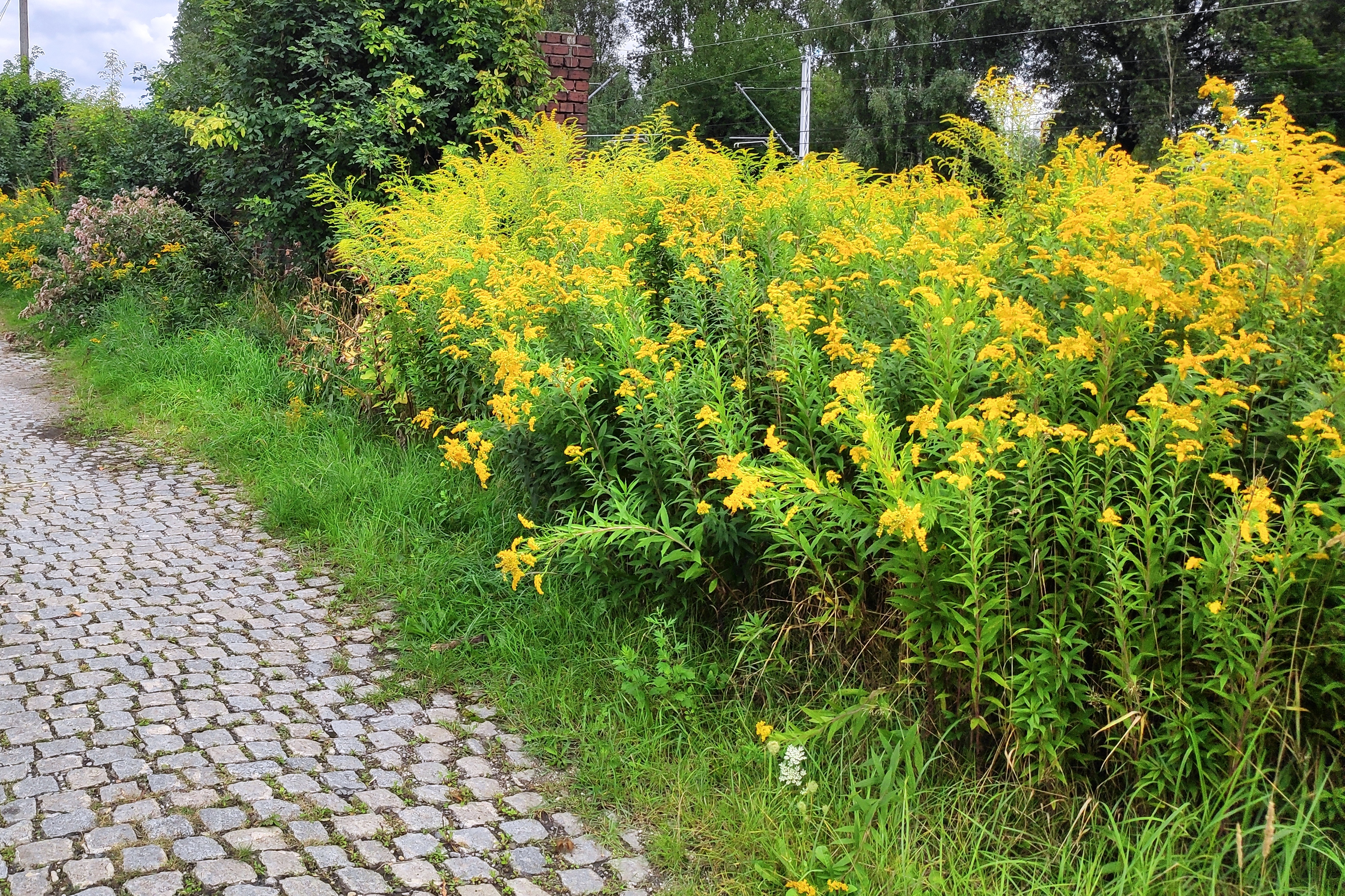
Canada goldenrod (Solidago canadensis) as a roadside weed in Poland

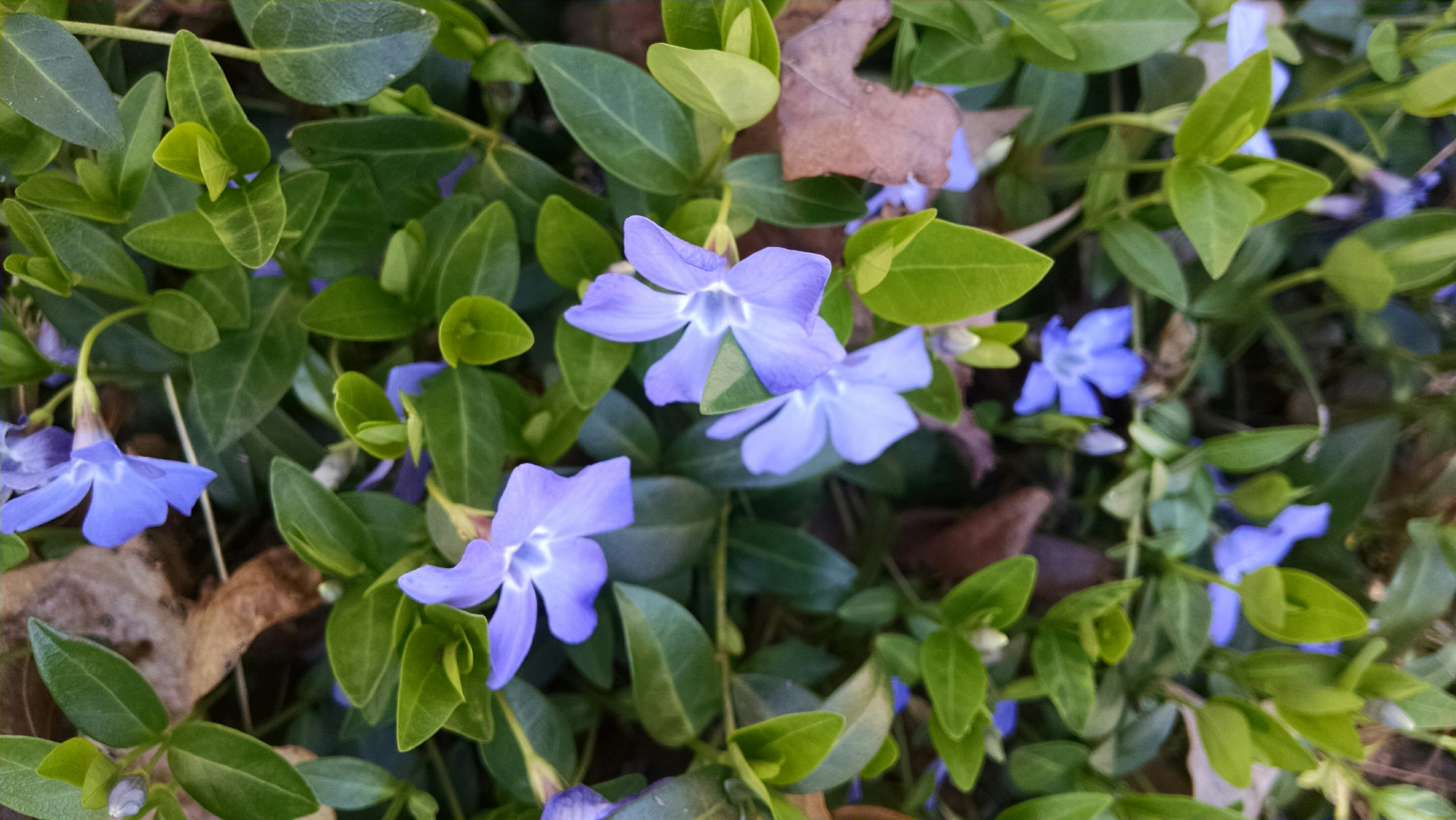
Vinca in a garden

An invasive species is an introduced species that harms its new environment. Invasive species adversely affect habitats and bioregions, causing ecological, environmental, and/or economic damage. Since the 20th century, invasive species have become serious economic, social, and environmental threats worldwide.

Invasion of long-established ecosystems by organisms is a natural phenomenon, but human-facilitated introductions have greatly increased the rate, scale, and geographic range of invasion. For millennia, humans have served as both accidental and deliberate dispersal agents, beginning with their earliest migrations, accelerating in the Age of Discovery, and accelerating again with the spread of international trade.

Notable plant species that are invasive in many parts of the world include the kudzu vine (Pueraria), water hyacinth (Pontederia crassipes), common ragweed (Ambrosia artemisiifolia), and yellow starthistle (Centaurea solstitialis). Notable animal species that are invasive include European rabbits (Oryctolagus cuniculus), domestic cats (Felis catus), and red swamp crayfish (Procambarus clarkii).

== Terminology ==
Invasive species are the subset of established non-native species that pose a threat to native species and biodiversity. The term "invasive" is poorly defined and often very subjective. Invasive species may be plants, animals, fungi, and microbes; some include native species that have invaded human habitats such as farms and landscapes. Some broaden the term to include indigenous or "native" species that have colonized natural areas. Some sources name Homo sapiens as an invasive species, but broad appreciation of human learning capacity and their behavioral potential and plasticity may argue against any such fixed categorization.

The definition of "native" can also be controversial. For example, the ancestors of modern horses (Equus ferus) evolved in North America and radiated to Eurasia before becoming extinct in North America. Their reintroduction to North America, by Spanish conquistadors, led to a 1943 debate over whether the feral horses were native or exotic to the continent of their evolutionary ancestors.

While invasive species can be studied within many subfields of biology, most research on invasive organisms has been in ecology and biogeography. Much of the work has been influenced by Charles Elton's 1958 book The Ecology of Invasion by Animals and Plants which creates a generalized picture of biological invasions. Studies remained sparse until the 1990s. This research, largely field observational studies, has disproportionately been concerned with terrestrial plants. The rapid growth of the field has driven a need to standardize the language used to describe invasive species and events. Despite this, little standard terminology exists. The field lacks any official designation but is commonly referred to as "invasion ecology" or more generally "invasion biology". This lack of standard terminology has arisen due to the interdisciplinary nature of the field, which borrows terms from disciplines such as agriculture, zoology, and pathology, as well as due to studies being performed in isolation.

Colautti and MacIsaac nomenclature
Stage	Characteristic
0	Propagules residing in a donor region
I	Traveling
II	Introduced
III	Localized and numerically rare
IVa	Widespread but rare
IVb	Localized but dominant
V	Widespread and dominant

In an attempt to avoid the ambiguous, subjective, and pejorative vocabulary that so often accompanies discussion of invasive species, even in scientific papers, Colautti and MacIsaac proposed a new nomenclature system. Based on biogeography rather than on taxa, the proposed system emphasizes ecology over taxonomy, human health, and economic factors. The model evaluated individual populations rather than entire species. It classified each population based on its success in that environment. This model applied equally to indigenous and to introduced species, and did not automatically categorize successful introductions as harmful.

The USDA's National Invasive Species Information Center defines invasive species very narrowly. According to Executive Order 13112, "'Invasive species' means an alien species whose introduction does or is likely to cause economic or environmental harm or harm to human health."

== Causes ==
Typically, an introduced species must persist at low population densities before it can become invasive in a new environment. At low densities, introduced species often face difficulties in reproducing and sustaining a viable population—sometimes requiring multiple introductions before establishment occurs. Patterns of repeated human movement, such as ship traffic between ports or vehicles travelling along major highways, can create recurring opportunities for arrival and establishment, a phenomenon known as high propagule pressure. Other anthropogenic activities such as movement of construction excess soil may result in introduction of new invasive species as well.

=== Ecosystem-based mechanisms ===
In ecosystems, the availability of resources determines the impact of additional species on the ecosystem. Stable ecosystems have a resource equilibrium, which can be changed fundamentally by the arrival of invasive species. When changes such as a forest fire occur, normal ecological succession favors native grasses and forbs. An introduced species that can spread faster than natives can outcompete native species for food, squeezing the natives out. Nitrogen and phosphorus are often the limiting factors in these situations. Every species occupies an ecological niche in its native ecosystem; some species fill large and varied roles, while others are highly specialized. Invading species may occupy unused niches, or create new ones. For example, edge effects describe what happens when part of an ecosystem is disturbed, as in when land is cleared for agriculture. The boundary between the remaining undisturbed habitat and the newly cleared land itself forms a distinct new habitat, creating new winners and losers, and potentially hosting species that would not otherwise thrive outside the boundary habitat.

In 1958, Charles S. Elton claimed that ecosystems with higher species diversity were less subject to invasive species because fewer niches remained unoccupied. Other ecologists later pointed to highly diverse, but heavily invaded ecosystems, arguing that ecosystems with high species diversity were more susceptible to invasion. This debate hinged on the spatial scale of invasion studies. Small-scale studies tended to show a negative relationship between diversity and invasion, while large-scale studies tended to show the reverse, perhaps a side-effect of invasives' ability to capitalize on increased resource availability and weaker species interactions that are more common when larger samples are considered. However, this pattern does not seem to hold true for invasive vertebrates.

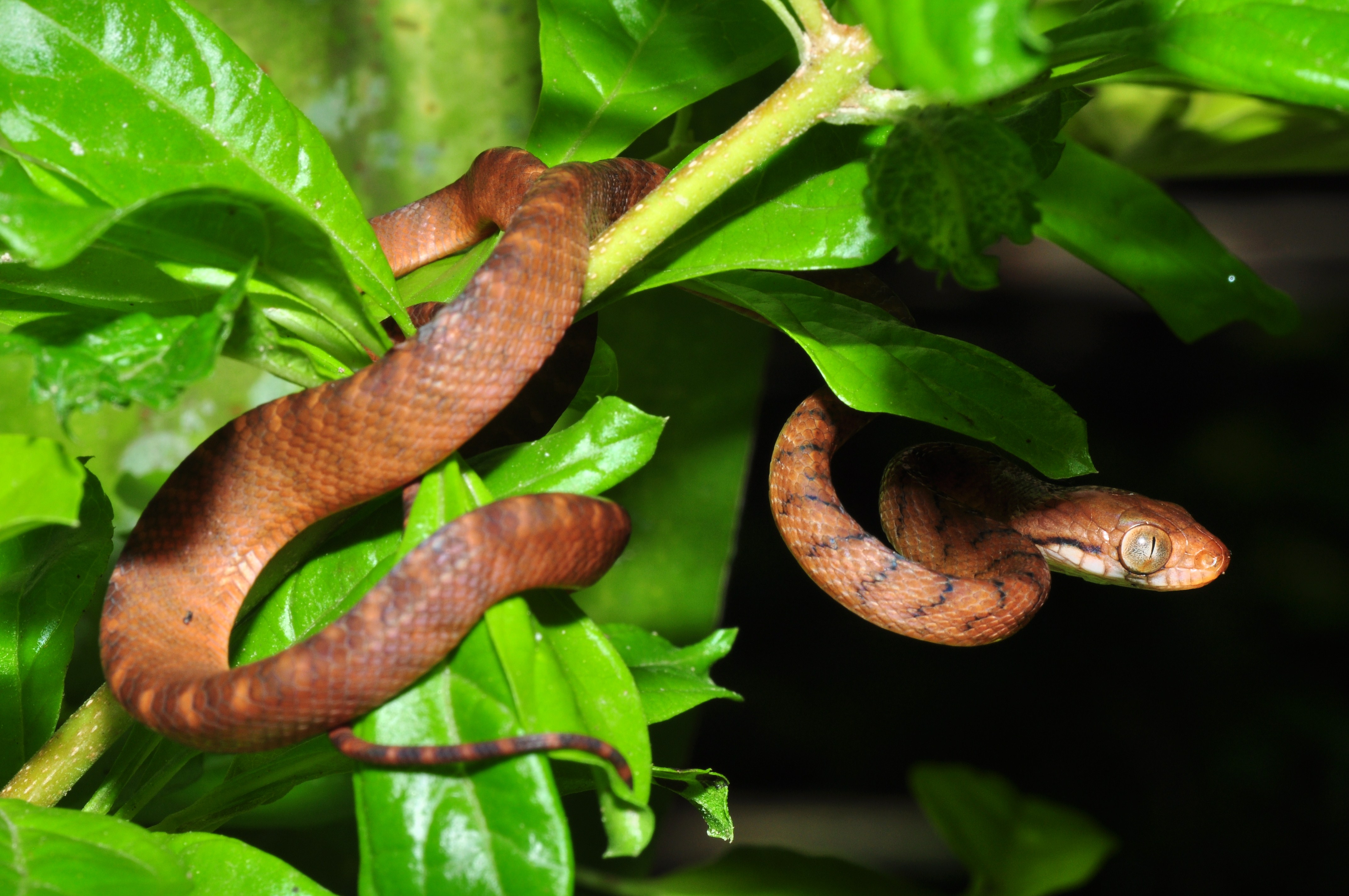
The brown tree snake (Boiga irregularis) has had an impact on the native bird population of the island ecosystem of Guam.

Island ecosystems may be more prone to invasion because their species face few strong competitors and predators, and because their distance from colonizing species populations makes them more likely to have "open" niches. For example, native bird populations on Guam have been decimated by the invasive brown tree snake (Boiga irregularis). However, the geographical distance and open water characteristic of island ecosystems can also delay colonisation by invasive species. For example, island nations such as Australia and the Galapagos have a high proportion of their island ecology consisting of endemic species due to immigration of other species being limited by oceans and their geographical isolation.

In New Zealand the first invasive species were the dogs and rats brought by Polynesian settlers around 1300. These and other introductions devastated endemic New Zealand species. The colonization of Madagascar brought similar harm to its ecosystems. Logging has caused harm directly by destroying habitat, and has allowed non-native species such as prickly pear (Opuntia) and silver wattle (Acacia dealbata) to invade. The water hyacinth (Pontederia crassipes) forms dense mats on water surfaces, limiting light penetration and hence harming aquatic organisms, and creating substantial management costs. The shrub lantana (Lantana camara) is now considered invasive in over 60 countries, and has invaded large geographies in several countries prompting aggressive federal efforts to control it.

Along with island ecosystems, intensively managed fenced areas are more prone to invasion. One reason is that species can enter through ways that fences cannot block. In the case of many plant species, dispersal can occur through wind, water, and birds carrying seeds either internally or externally. Small animals or insects are sometimes also able to make it through fenced areas. Another reason is that intensive management methods create opportunities for these invasive species to thrive. When fenced areas are established, they are intensively managed through clearing vegetation, mowing, and disturbing the soil. This reduces competition from the native plant species in the area and exposes the soil so that invasive species can easily populate the area. The purpose of these fenced areas is often to keep unwanted herbivores out of the areas. Because there are no threats to the invasive plants that can take over intensively managed fenced areas, they can flourish without predatory threats. Finally, in general, invasive species have traits that favor their survival. Most invasive species are extremely resilient and have traits that favor their establishment in areas where they are not native. These traits, along with the intensive management of the fenced areas, create an ideal environment in which these invasive species can thrive.

Primary geomorphological effects of invasive plants are bioconstruction and bioprotection. For example, kudzu (Pueraria montana), a vine native to Asia, was widely introduced in the southeastern United States in the early 20th century to control soil erosion. The primary geomorphological effects of invasive animals are bioturbation, bioerosion, and bioconstruction. For example, invasions of the Chinese mitten crab (Eriocheir sinensis) have resulted in higher bioturbation and bioerosion rates.

A native species can also become harmful and effectively invasive to its native environment after human alterations to its food web. This has been the case with the purple sea urchin (Strongylocentrotus purpuratus), which has decimated kelp forests along the northern California coast due to overharvesting of its natural predator, the California sea otter (Enhydra lutris).

=== Species-based mechanisms ===
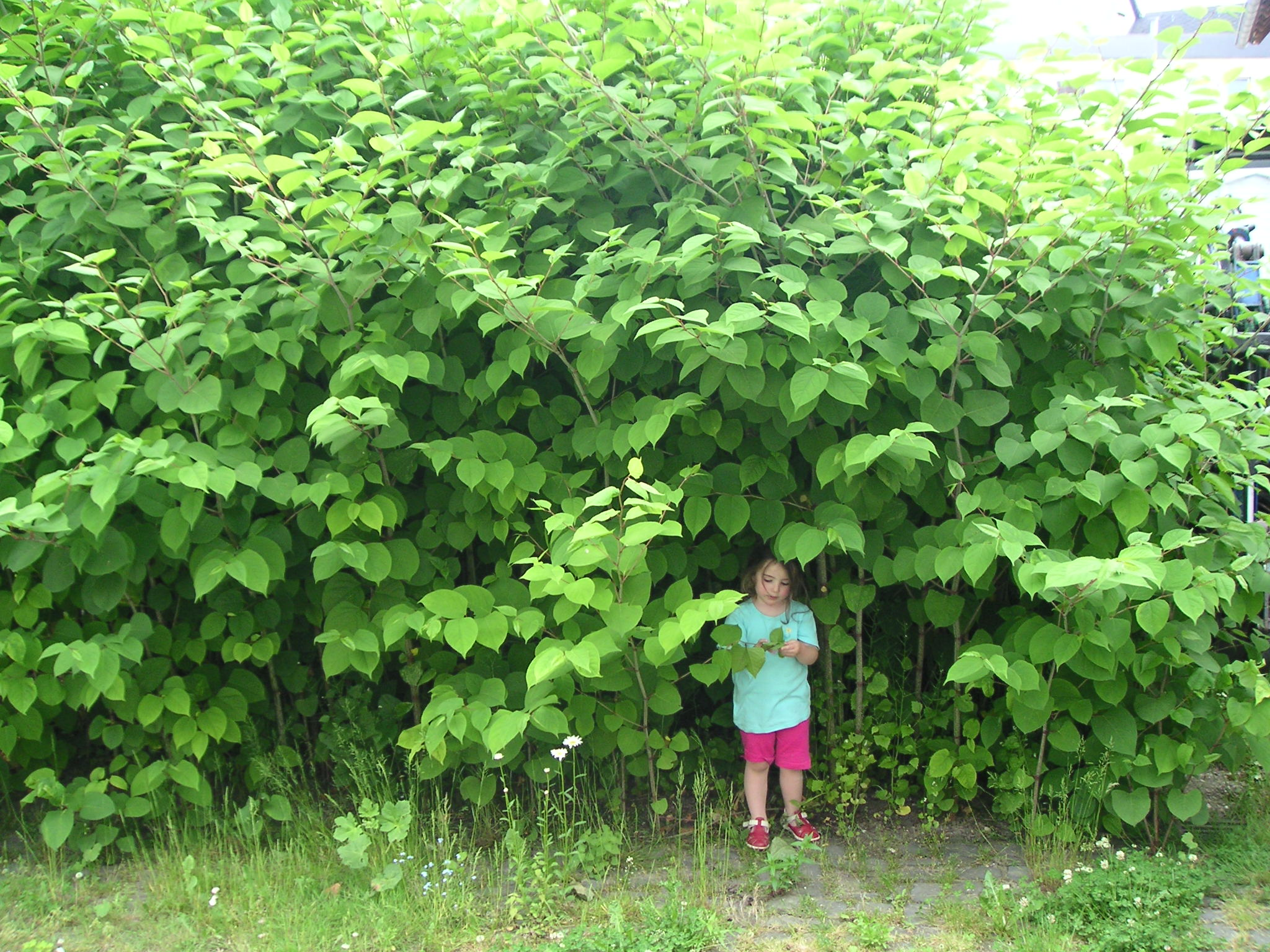
Japanese knotweed (Reynoutria japonica) is considered one of the world's worst invasive species.

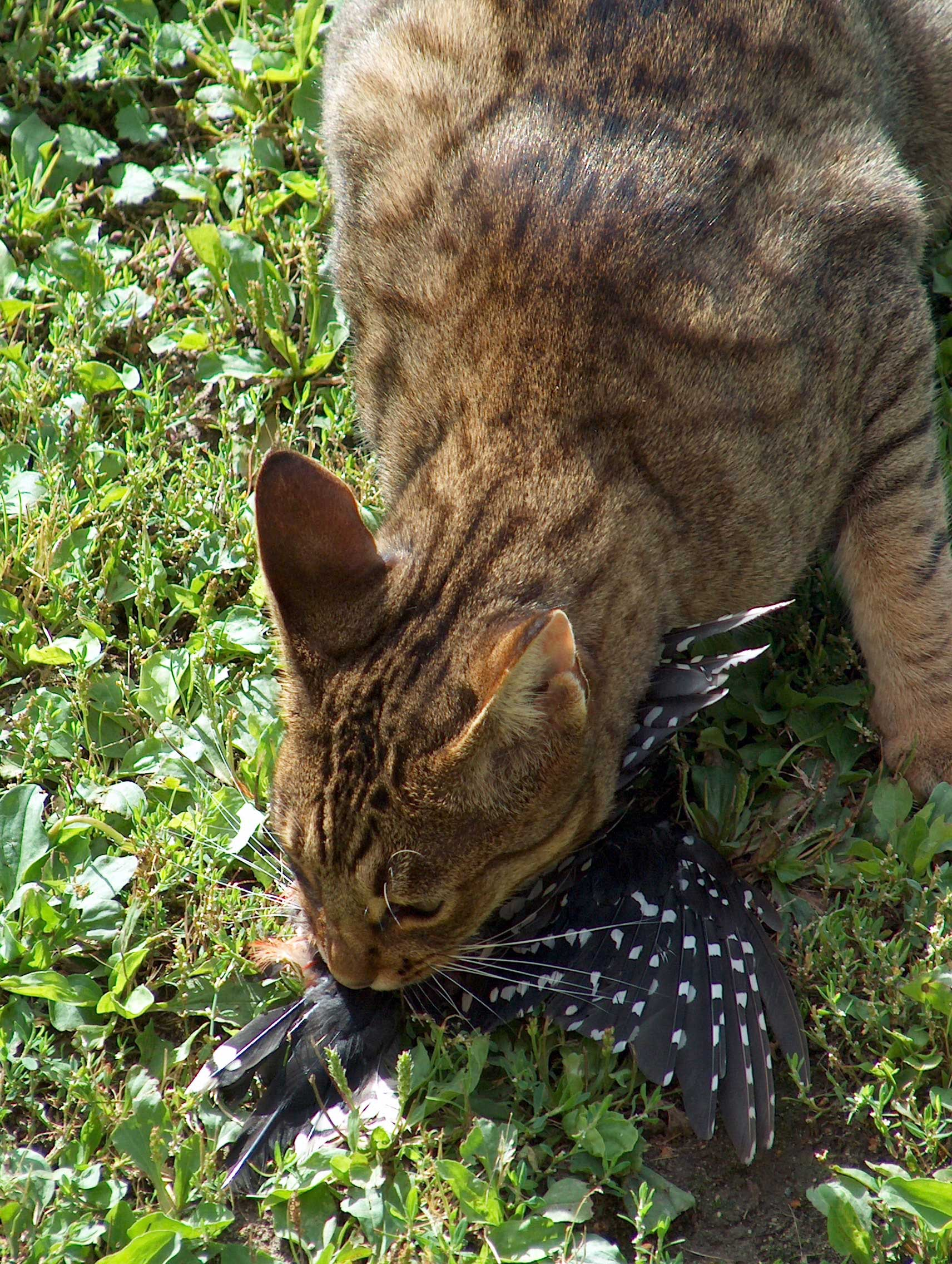
Cats (Felis catus) (here, killing a woodpecker) are considered invasive species in Australia and negatively impact wildlife worldwide.

Invasive species appear to have specific traits or specific combinations of traits that allow them to outcompete native species. In some cases, these characteristics include rates of growth and reproduction. In other cases, invasive species interact with native species other more directly. One study found that 86% of invasive species could be identified from such traits alone. Another study found that invasive species often had only a few of the traits, and that noninvasive species had these also. Common invasive species traits include fast growth and rapid reproduction, such as vegetative reproduction in plants; association with humans; and prior successful invasions. Domestic cats (Felis catus) are effective predators of wildlife. They have become feral and invasive in places such as the Florida Keys.

An introduced species might become invasive if it can outcompete native species for resources. If these species evolved under great competition or predation, then the new environment may host fewer able competitors, allowing the invader to proliferate. Ecosystems used to their fullest capacity by native species can be modeled as zero-sum systems, in which any gain for the invader is a loss for the native. However, such unilateral competitive superiority (and extinction of native species with increased populations of the invader) is not the rule.

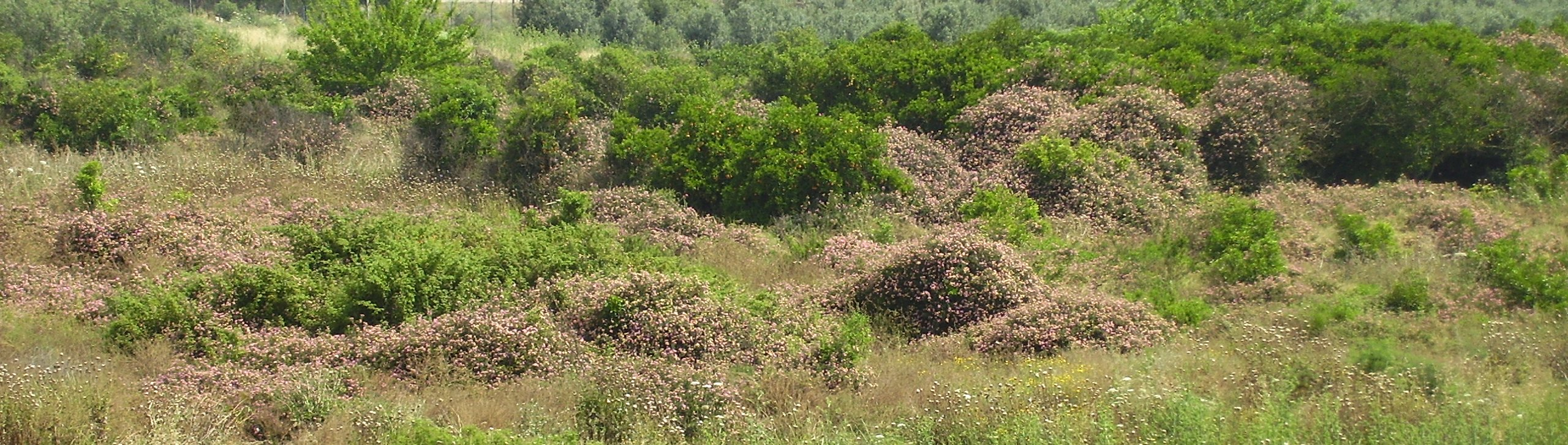
Lantana, abandoned citrus, Sdei Hemed

An invasive species might be able to use resources previously unavailable to native species, such as deep water accessed by a long taproot, or to live on previously uninhabited soil types. For example, barbed goatgrass (Aegilops triuncialis) was introduced to California on serpentine soils, which have low water-retention, low nutrient levels, a high magnesium/calcium ratio, and possible heavy metal toxicity. Plant populations on these soils tend to show low density, but goatgrass can form dense stands on these soils and crowd out native species.

Invasive species may also alter their environment by releasing chemical compounds, modifying abiotic factors, or affecting the behavior of herbivores, all of which can impact other species. Some, like mother of thousands (Kalanchoe daigremontana), produce allelopathic compounds that inhibit competitors. Others like the toad plant (Stapelia gigantea) facilitate the growth of seedlings of other species in arid environments by providing appropriate microclimates and preventing herbivores from eating seedlings.

Changes in fire regimens are another form of facilitation. Cheatgrass (Bromus tectorum), originally from Eurasia, is highly fire-adapted. It spreads rapidly after burning, and increases the frequency and intensity of fires by providing large amounts of dry detritus during the fire season in western North America. Where it is widespread, it has altered the local fire regimen so much that native plants cannot survive the frequent fires, allowing it to become dominant in its introduced range.

Ecological facilitation occurs where one species, including invasive species, physically modifies a habitat in ways advantageous to other species. For example, zebra mussels (Dreissena polymorpha) increase habitat complexity on lake floors, providing crevices in which invertebrates live. This increase in complexity, together with the nutrition provided by the waste products of mussel filter-feeding, increases the density and diversity of benthic invertebrate communities.

Introduced species may spread rapidly and unpredictably. When bottlenecks and founder effects cause a great decrease in the population size and may constrict genetic variation, individuals begin to show additive variance as opposed to epistatic variance. This conversion can lead to increased variance in the founding populations, which permits rapid evolution. Selection may then act on the capacity to disperse as well as on physiological tolerance to new stressors in the environment, such as changed temperature and different predators and prey.

Rapid adaptive evolution through intraspecific phenotypic plasticity, pre-adaptation, and post-introduction evolution lead to offspring that have higher fitness. Critically, plasticity permits changes to better suit the individual to its environment. Pre-adaptations and evolution after the introduction reinforce the success of the introduced species.

The enemy release hypothesis states that evolution leads to ecological balance in every ecosystem. No single species can occupy a majority of an ecosystem due to the presences of competitors, predators, and diseases. Introduced species moved to a novel habitat can become invasive, with rapid population growth, when these controls do not exist in the new ecosystem.

== Vectors ==
Non-native species have many vectors, but most are associated with human activity. Natural range extensions are common, but humans often carry specimens faster and over greater distances than natural forces. An early human vector occurred when prehistoric humans introduced the Pacific rat (Rattus exulans) to Polynesia.

Humans have historically acted as vectors, both deliberately and accidentally. During the colonial era, there were acclimatization societies that aimed to deliberately establish animals and plants that were recognizable to Europeans. These societies felt that this would be an "improvement" to nature by adding species that were nostalgic and valuable. Another reason for deliberate introduction was that some species are thought to act as biocontrol. The cane toad was introduced in Australia in hopes of controlling the cane beetle population. Cane beetles are pests of the sugar cane crop. While only 100 toads were initially imported, there are now over 200 million present in Australia. Another example of animal introduction is the Indian mongoose, which was introduced in Hawaii to control the rat population as the rats were damaging sugar cane yields. This, however, ended up being ineffective because rats are nocturnal while the mongoose is diurnal. Their introduction ended up causing new problems for the island's ecosystems.

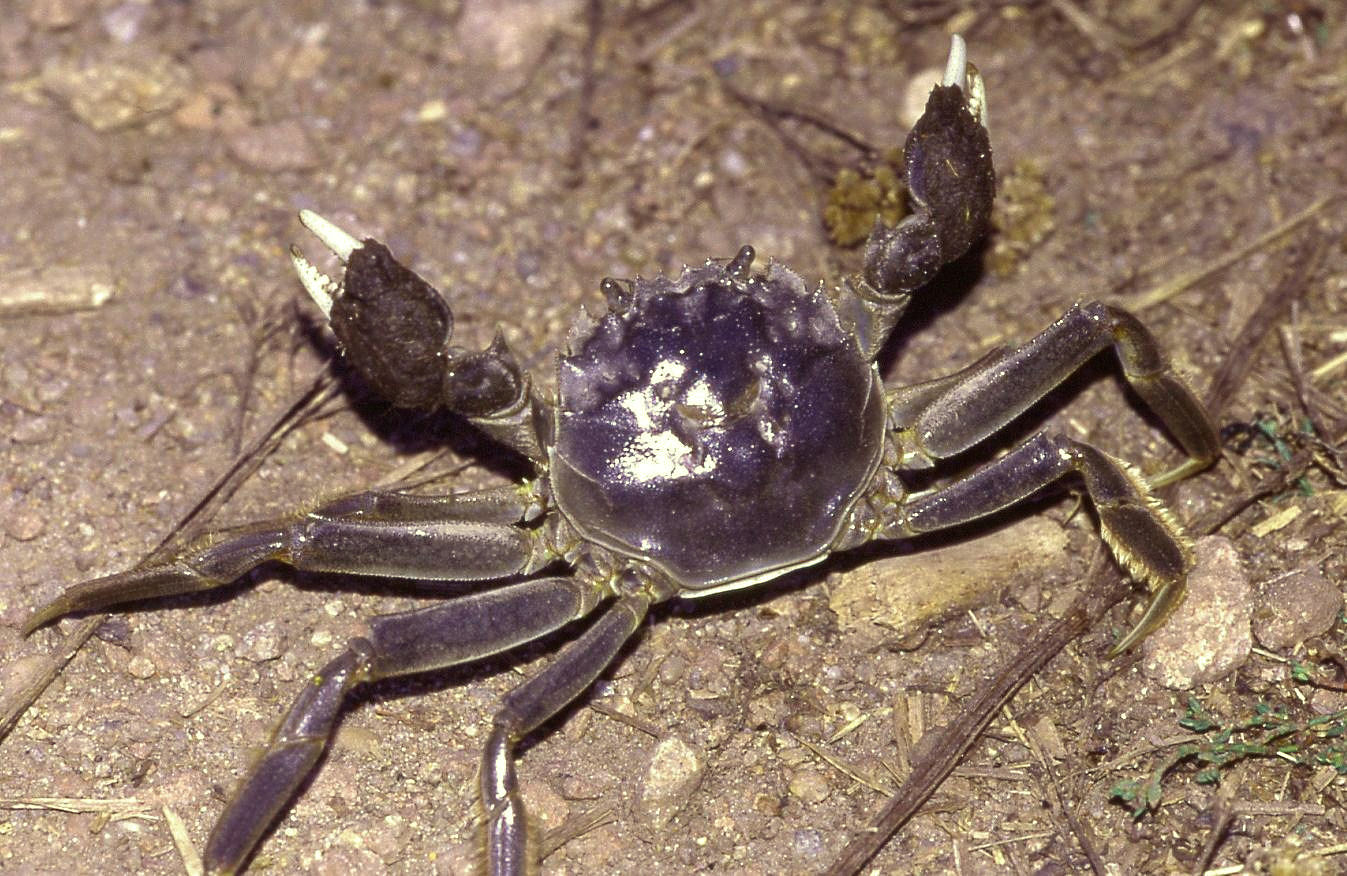
The Chinese mitten crab (Eriocheir sinensis) may have been purposely introduced in Europe and North America because of its commercial value.

Vectors also include plants or seeds imported for horticulture. The pet trade moves animals across borders, where they can escape and become invasive. Organisms may also stow away on transport vehicles. Incidental human assisted transfer is the main cause of introductions – other than in polar regions. Diseases may be vectored by invasive insects: the Asian citrus psyllid (Diaphorina citri) carries the bacterial disease citrus greening. The arrival of invasive propagules to a new site is a function of the site's invasibility. Recreation is one of the most underestimated vectors for invasive species spread. Seeds, spores, larvae, and pathogens can hitchhike on boats, boots, waders, bikes, pets, vehicles, and firewood, moving farther and faster than natural dispersal ever could.

Many invasive species, once they are dominant in the area, become essential to the ecosystem of that area, and their removal could be harmful. Economics plays a major role in exotic species introduction. High demand for the valuable Chinese mitten crab is one explanation for the possible intentional release of the species in foreign waters.

=== Within the aquatic environment ===
Maritime trade has rapidly affected the way marine organisms are transported within the ocean; new means of species transport include hull fouling and ballast water transport. In fact, Molnar et al. 2008 documented the pathways of hundreds of marine invasive species and found that shipping was the dominant mechanism for the transfer of invasive species.

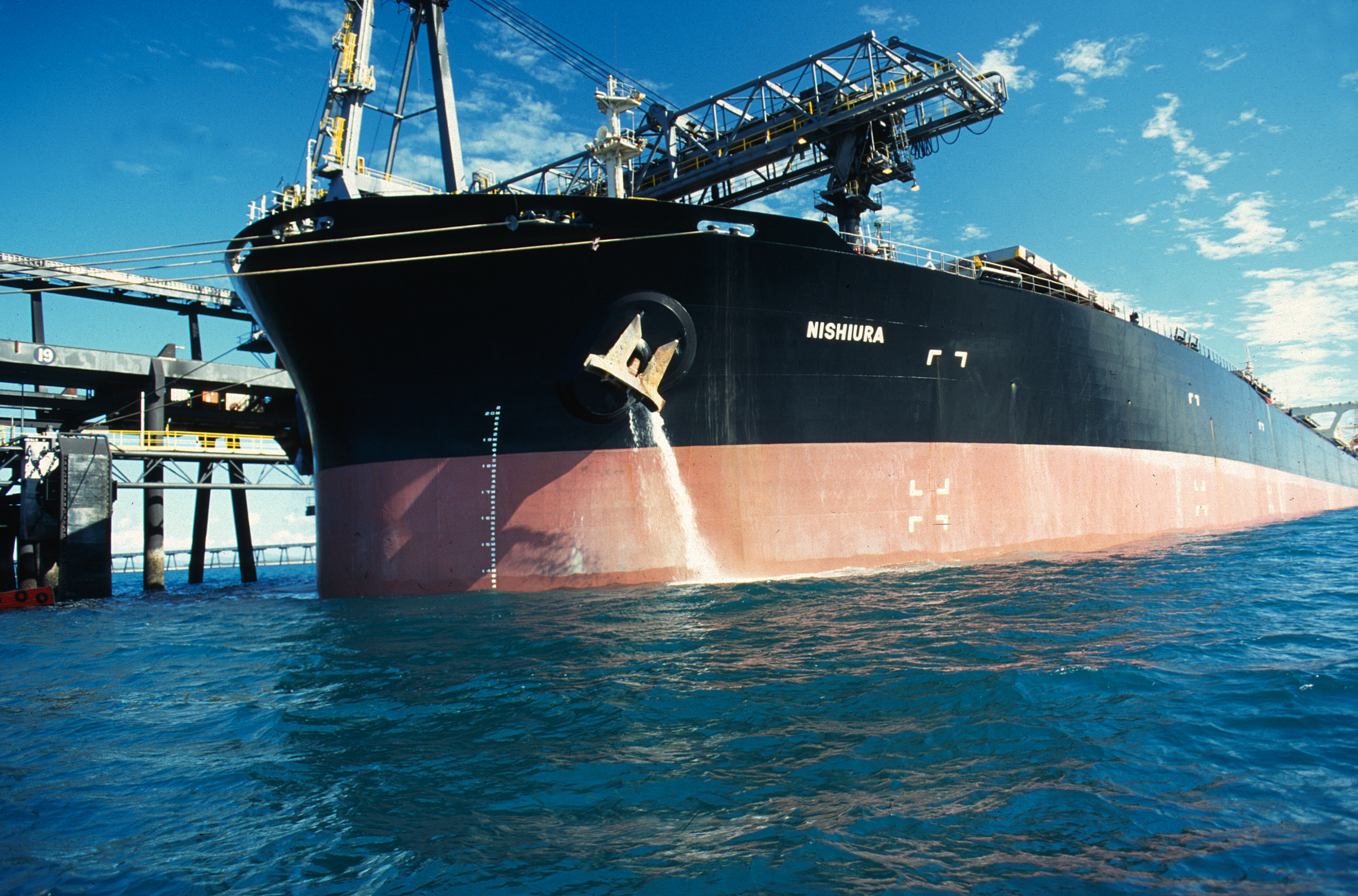
Cargo ship de-ballasting

Many marine organisms can attach themselves to vessel hulls. Such organisms are easily transported from one body of water to another, and are a significant risk factor for a biological invasion event. Controlling for vessel hull fouling is voluntary and there are no regulations currently in place to manage hull fouling. However, the governments of California and New Zealand have announced more stringent control for vessel hull fouling within their respective jurisdictions.

Another vector of non-native aquatic species is ballast water taken up at sea and released in port by transoceanic vessels. Some 10,000 species are transported via ballast water each day. Many of these are harmful. For example, freshwater zebra mussels (Dreissena polymorpha) from Eurasia most likely reached the Great Lakes via ballast water. The mussels outcompete native organisms for oxygen and food, and can be transported in the small puddle left in a supposedly empty ballast tank. Also, three lineages of the Asian clam genus Corbicula (C. fluminea, C. fluminalis, C. leana) are globally invasive. Molecular data confirm their taxonomic identity and reveal multiple independent introduction events. Regulations attempt to mitigate such risks, not always successfully. Climate change is causing an increase in ocean temperature. These changes to the environment in turn cause range shifts in organisms, creating new species interactions. For example, organisms in a ballast tank of a ship traveling from the temperate zone through tropical waters may experience temperature fluctuations as much as 20 °C. Heat challenges during transport may enhance the stress tolerance of species in their non-native range, by selecting for genotypes that will survive a second applied heat stress, such as increased ocean temperature in the founder population.

In large, undisturbed river systems, native species can act as a biological barrier or "living shield" by occupying available ecological niches. For example, in the Volga-Kama basin, the presence of native piscivorous fish species has been shown to constrain the expansion and naturalization of highly invasive species such as the Amur sleeper (Perccottus glenii) and the Stone moroko (Pseudorasbora parva) in main river channels, limiting their impact to isolated, overgrown floodplain backwaters.

=== Effects of wildfire and firefighting ===
Invasive species often exploit disturbances to an ecosystem (wildfires, roads, foot trails) to colonize an area. Large wildfires can sterilize soils, while adding nutrients. Invasive plants that can regenerate from their roots then have an advantage over natives that rely on seeds for propagation.

== Adverse effects ==
Invasive species can affect the invaded habitats, communities, and ecosystems adversely, causing ecological, environmental, and/or economic damage.

=== Ecological ===
The European Union defines "Invasive Alien Species" as those that are outside their natural distribution area, and that threaten biological diversity. Biotic invasion is one of the five top drivers for global biodiversity loss, and is increasing because of tourism and globalization. This may be particularly true in inadequately regulated fresh water systems, though quarantines and ballast water rules have improved the situation.

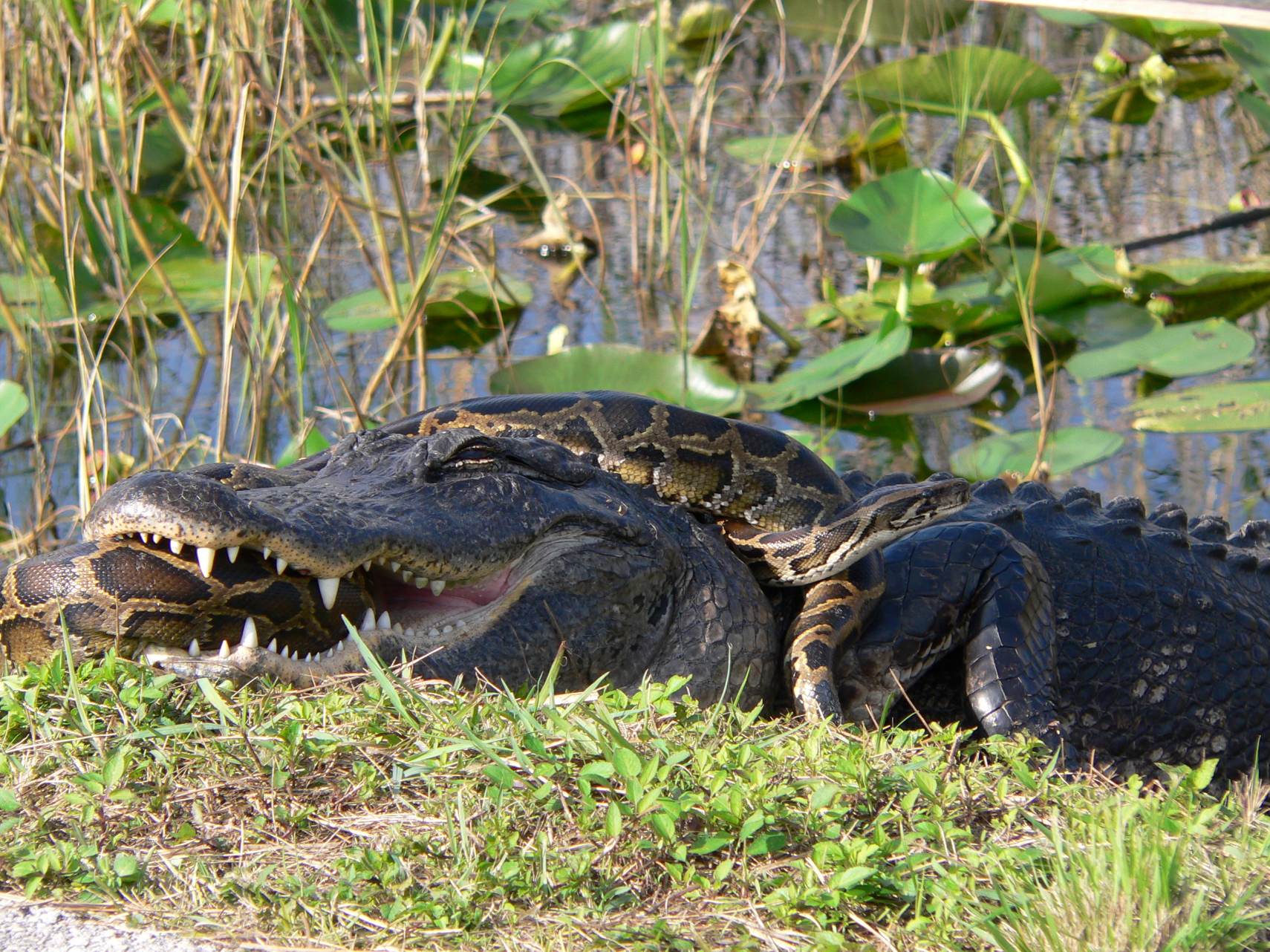
American alligator (Alligator mississippiensis) combatting a Burmese python (Python bivittatus) in Florida

Invasive species may drive local native species to extinction via competitive exclusion, niche displacement, or hybridization with related native species. Therefore, besides their economic ramifications, alien invasions may result in extensive changes in the structure, composition and global distribution of the biota at sites of introduction, leading ultimately to the homogenization of the world's fauna and flora and the loss of biodiversity. It is difficult to unequivocally attribute extinctions to a species invasion, though for example there is strong evidence that the extinction of about 90 amphibian species was caused by the chytrid fungus (Batrachochytrium dendrobatidis) spread by international trade.

Multiple successive introductions of different non-native species can worsen the total effect, as with the introductions of the amethyst gem clam (Gemma gemma) and the European green crab (Carcinus maenas). The gem clam was introduced into California's Bodega Harbor from the US East Coast a century ago. On its own, it did not displace native clams (Nutricola spp.). However, in the mid-1990s, the introduction of the European green crab resulted in an increase of the amethyst gem at the expense of the native clams. In India, multiple invasive plants have invaded 66% of natural areas, reducing the densities of native forage plants, declining the habitat-use by wild herbivores and threatening the long-term sustenance of dependent carnivores, including tigers.

Invasive species can change the functions of ecosystems. For example, invasive plants can alter the fire regime (e.g., cheatgrass, Bromus tectorum), nutrient cycling (e.g., smooth cordgrass, Spartina alterniflora), and hydrology (e.g.,Tamarix) in native ecosystems. Invasive species that are closely related to rare native species have the potential to hybridize with the native species. Harmful effects of hybridization have led to a decline and even extinction of native species. For example, hybridization with introduced cordgrass threatens the existence of California cordgrass (Spartina foliosa) in San Francisco Bay. Invasive species cause competition for native species, and because of this 400 of the 958 endangered species under the Endangered Species Act are at risk.

Poster from the State of California asking campers to not move firewood around, avoiding the spread of invasive species

The unintentional introduction of forest pest species and plant pathogens can change forest ecology and damage the timber industry. Overall, forest ecosystems in the U.S. are widely invaded by exotic pests, plants, and pathogens.

The Asian long-horned beetle (Anoplophora glabripennis) was first introduced into the U.S. in 1996, and was expected to infect and damage millions of acres of hardwood trees. As of 2005 thirty million dollars had been spent in attempts to eradicate this pest and protect millions of trees in the affected regions. The woolly adelgid (Adelges tsugae) has inflicted damage on old-growth spruce, fir and hemlock forests and damages the Christmas tree industry. Chestnut blight (Cryphonectria parasitica) and Dutch elm disease (Ascomycota) are plant pathogens with serious impacts. Garlic mustard (Alliaria petiolata) is one of the most problematic invasive plant species in eastern North American forests, where it is highly invasive of the understory, reducing the growth rate of tree seedlings and threatening to modify the forest's tree composition.

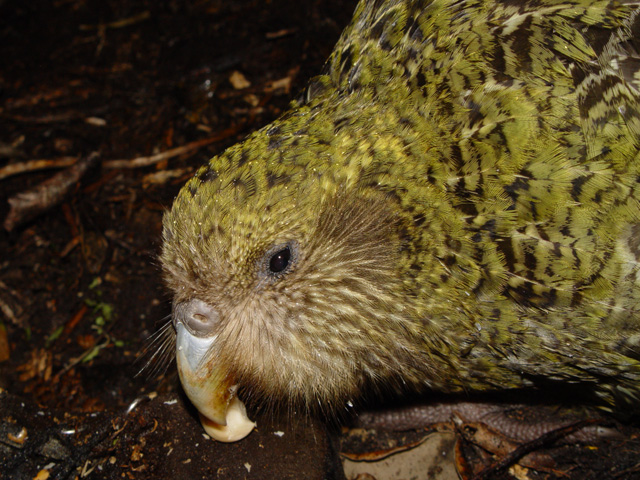
The Kākāpō is a threatened species partially because of predation by invasive species (mostly rats and cats), there are only ≈240 individuals left worldwide

Native species can be threatened with extinction through the process of genetic pollution. Genetic pollution is unintentional hybridization and introgression, which leads to homogenization or replacement of local genotypes as a result of either a numerical or fitness advantage of the introduced species. Genetic pollution occurs either through introduction or through habitat modification, where previously isolated species are brought into contact with the new genotypes. Invading species have been shown to adapt to their new environments in a remarkably short amount of time. The population size of invading species may remain small for a number of years and then experience an explosion in population, a phenomenon known as "the lag effect".

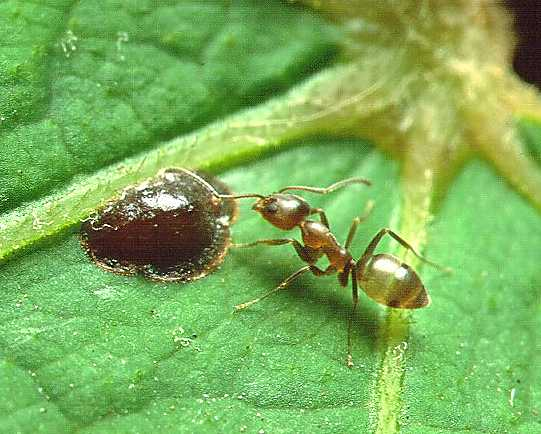
Argentine ants (Linepithema humile), which form supercolonies across continents, are ranked among the world's 100 worst invasive animal species.

Hybrids resulting from invasive species interbreeding with native species can incorporate their genotypes into the gene pool over time through introgression. Similarly, in some instances a small invading population can threaten much larger native populations. For example, cordgrass (Spartina alterniflora) was introduced in the San Francisco Bay and hybridized with native California cordgrass (Spartina foliosa). The higher pollen count and male fitness of the invading species resulted in introgression that threatened the native populations due to lower pollen counts and lower viability of the native species. Reduction in fitness is not always apparent from morphological observations alone. Some degree of gene flow is normal, and preserves constellations of genes and genotypes. An example of this is the interbreeding of migrating coyotes (Canis latrans) with the critically endangered red wolf (Canis rufus), in areas of eastern North Carolina where the red wolf was reintroduced, reducing wolf numbers.

Some invasive species can introduce diseases that harm native wildlife. An example of this is the Harlequin Ladybird (Harmonia axyridis) in the UK, which can carry an STD called Laboulbenia, that can infect native Ladybird species.

=== Environmental ===
In South Africa's Cape Town region, analysis demonstrated that the restoration of priority source water sub-catchments through the removal of thirsty alien plant invasions (such as Australian acacias, pines, eucalyptus, and Australian black wattle) would generate expected annual water gains of 50 billion liters within 5 years compared to the business-as-usual scenario (which is important as Cape Town experiences significant water scarcity). This is the equivalent to one-sixth of the city's current supply needs. These annual gains will double within 30 years. The catchment restoration is significantly more cost-effective then other water augmentation solutions (1/10 the unit cost of alternative options). A water fund has been established, and these exotic species are being eradicated.

=== Human health ===
Invasive species can affect human health. With the alteration in ecosystem functionality (due to homogenization of biota communities), invasive species have resulted in negative effects on human well-being, which includes reduced resource availability, unrestrained spread of human diseases, recreational and educational activities, and tourism. Alien species have caused diseases including human immunodeficiency virus (HIV), monkey pox, and severe acute respiratory syndrome (SARS).

Invasive species and accompanying control efforts can have long term public health implications. For instance, pesticides applied to treat a particular pest species could pollute soil and surface water. Encroachment of humans into previously remote ecosystems has exposed exotic diseases such as HIV to the wider population. Introduced birds (e.g. pigeons), rodents, and insects (e.g. mosquito, flea, louse and tsetse fly pests) can serve as vectors and reservoirs of human afflictions. Throughout recorded history, epidemics of human diseases, such as malaria, yellow fever, typhus, and bubonic plague, spread via these vectors. A recent example of an introduced disease is the spread of the West Nile virus, which killed humans, birds, mammals, and reptiles. The introduced Chinese mitten crabs (Eriocheir sinensis) are carriers of Asian lung fluke. Waterborne disease agents, such as cholera bacteria (Vibrio cholerae), and causative agents of harmful algal blooms are often transported via ballast water.

=== Economic ===
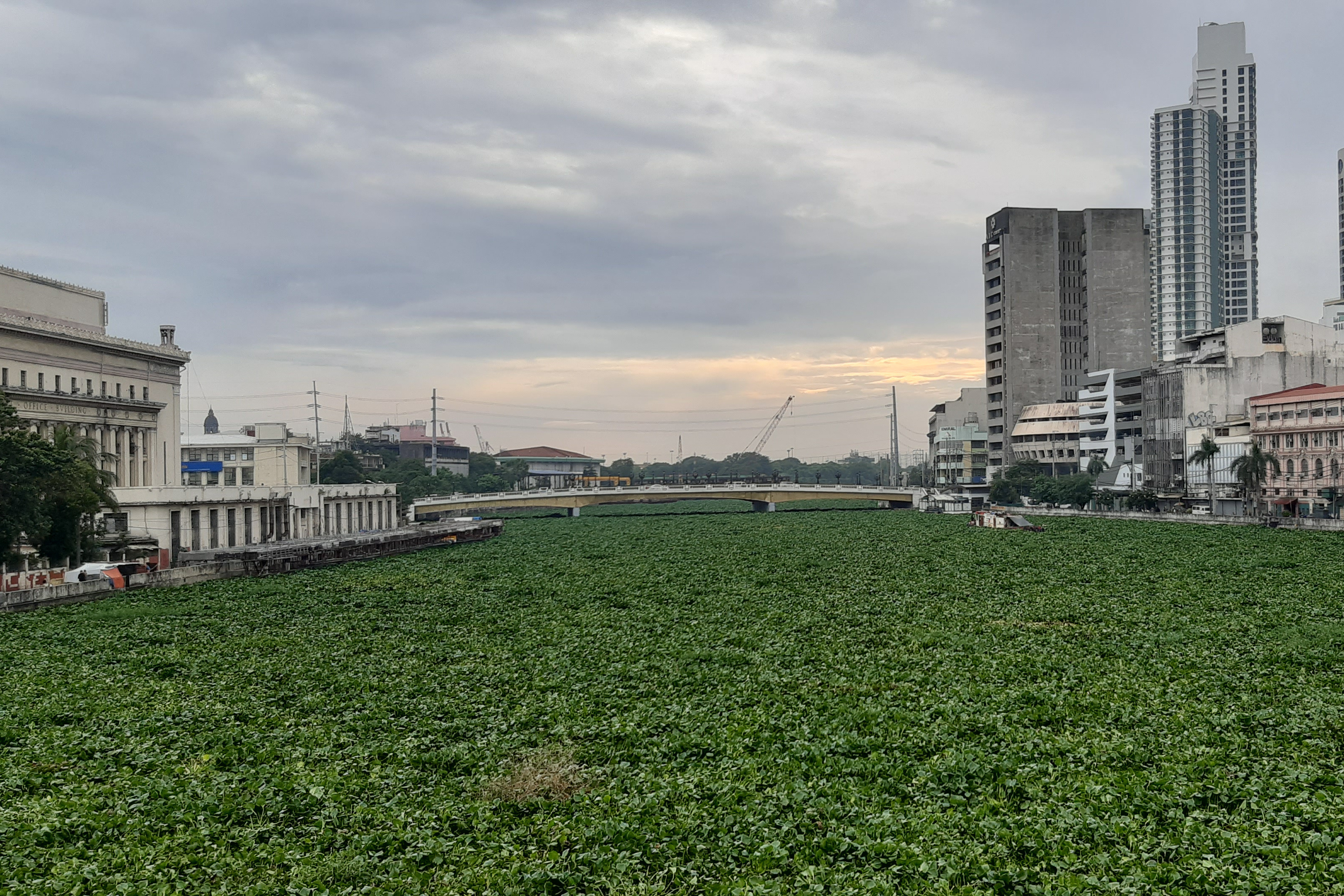
Invasive water hyacinths (Pontederia crassipes) clog the Pasig River in Manila, Philippines in October 2020.

Globally, invasive species management and control are substantial economic burdens, with expenditures reaching approximately $1.4 trillion annually. The economic impact of invasive species alone was estimated to exceed $423 billion annually as of 2019. This cost has exhibited a significant increase, quadrupling every decade since 1970, underscoring the escalating financial implications of these biological invasions.

Invasive species contribute to ecological degradation, altering ecosystem functionality and reducing the services ecosystems provide. This necessitates additional expenditures to control the spread of biological invasions, mitigate further impacts, and restore affected ecosystems. For example, the damage caused by 79 invasive species between 1906 and 1991 in the United States has been estimated at US$120 billion. Similarly, in China, invasive species have been reported to reduce the country's gross domestic product (GDP) by 1.36% per year.

The management of biological invasions can be costly. In Australia, for instance, the expense to monitor, control, manage, and research invasive weed species is approximately AU$116.4 million per year, with costs directed solely to central and local governments.

While, in some cases, invasive species may offer economic benefits—such as the potential for commercial forestry from invasive trees—these benefits are generally overshadowed by the substantial costs associated with biological invasions. In most cases, the economic returns from invasive species are far less than the costs they impose.

==== United States ====
In the Great Lakes region the sea lamprey (Petromyzon marinus) is an invasive species. In its original habitat, it had co-evolved as a parasite that did not kill its host. However, in the Great Lakes region, it acts as a predator and can consume up to 40 pounds of fish in its 12–18 month feeding period. Sea lampreys prey on all types of large fish such as lake trout (Salvelinus namaycush) and salmon. The sea lampreys' destructive effects on large fish negatively affect the fishing industry and have helped cause the collapse of the population of some species.

Economic costs from invasive species can be separated into direct costs through production loss in agriculture and forestry, and management costs. Estimated damage and control costs of invasive species in the U.S. amount to more than $138 billion annually. Economic losses can occur through loss of recreational and tourism revenues. When economic costs of invasions are calculated as production loss and management costs, they are low because they do not consider environmental damage; if monetary values were assigned to the extinction of species, loss in biodiversity, and loss of ecosystem services, costs from impacts of invasive species would drastically increase. It is often argued that the key to invasive species management is early detection and rapid response. However, early response only helps when the invasive species is not frequently reintroduced into the managed area, and the cost of response is affordable.

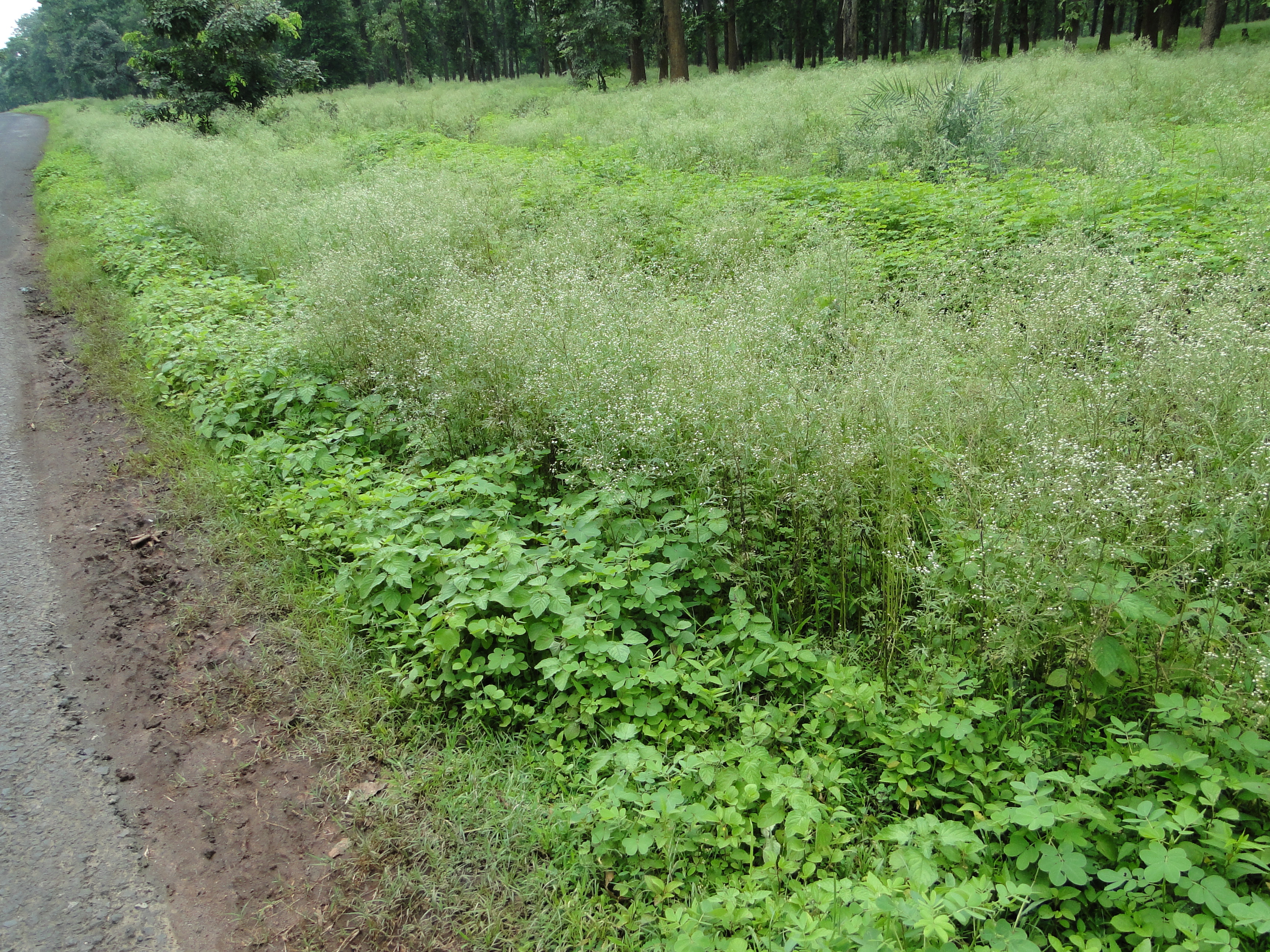
Parthenium hysterophorus, Achanakmar Tiger Reserve

Weeds reduce yield in agriculture. Many weeds are accidental introductions that accompany imports of commercial seeds and plants. Introduced weeds in pastures compete with native forage plants, threaten young cattle (e.g., leafy spurge, Euphorbia virgata) or are unpalatable because of thorns and spines (e.g., yellow starthistle, Centaurea solstitialis). Forage loss from invasive weeds on pastures amounts to nearly US$1 billion in the U.S. A decline in pollinator services and loss of fruit production has been caused by honey bees (Apis mellifera) infected by the invasive varroa mite (Varroa destructor). Introduced rats (Rattus rattus and R. norvegicus) have become serious pests on farms, destroying stored grains. The introduction of leaf miner flies (Agromyzidae), including the American serpentine leaf miner (Liriomyza trifolii), to California has caused losses in California's floriculture industry, as the larvae of these invasive species feed on ornamental plants.

Invasive plant pathogens and insect vectors for plant diseases can suppress agricultural yields and harm nursery stock. Citrus greening is a bacterial disease vectored by the invasive Asian citrus psyllid (Diaphorina citri). As a result, citrus is under quarantine and highly regulated in areas where the psyllid has been found.

Invasive species can impact outdoor recreation, such as fishing, hunting, hiking, wildlife viewing, and water-based activities. They can damage environmental services including water quality, plant and animal diversity, and species abundance, though the extent of this is under-researched. Eurasian watermilfoil (Myriophyllum spicatum) in parts of the US, fills lakes with plants, complicating fishing and boating. The loud call of the introduced common coqui (Eleutherodactylus coqui) depresses real estate values in affected neighborhoods of Hawaii. The large webs of the orb-weaving spider (Zygiella x-notata), invasive in California, disrupts garden work.

==== Europe ====
The overall economic cost of invasive alien species in Europe between 1960 and 2020 has been estimated at around US$140 billion (including potential costs that may or may not have actually materialized) or US$78 billion (only including observed costs known to have materialized). These estimates are very conservative. Models based on these data suggest a true annual cost of around US$140 billion in 2020.

Italy is one of the most invaded countries in Europe, with an estimate of more than 3,000 alien species. The impacts of invasive alien species on the economy has been wide-ranging, from management costs, to loss of crops, to infrastructure damage. The overall economic cost of invasions to Italy between 1990 and 2020 was estimated at US$819.76 million (EUR€704.78 million). However, only 15 recorded species have more reliably estimated costs, hence the actual cost may be much larger than the aforementioned sum.

France has an estimated minimum of 2,750 introduced and invasive alien species. Renault et al. (2021) obtained 1,583 cost records for 98 invasive alien species and found that they caused a conservative total cost between US$1.2 billion and 11.5 billion over the period 1993–2018. This study extrapolated costs for species invading France, but for which costs were reported only in other countries but not in France, which yielded an additional cost ranging from US$151 million to $3.03 billion. Damage costs were nearly eight times higher than management expenditure. Insects, and in particular the Asian tiger mosquito (Aedes albopictus) and the yellow fever mosquito (A. aegypti), created the highest economic costs, followed by non-graminoid terrestrial flowering and aquatic plants (Ambrosia artemisiifolia, Ludwigia sp. and Lagarosiphon major). Over 90% of alien species currently recorded in France had no costs reported in the literature, resulting in high biases in taxonomic, regional and activity sector coverages. However, the lack of reports does not mean there are no negative consequences or costs.

== Favorable effects ==
The consensus of the scientific community is that the effects of invasive species on biodiversity are primarily negative, despite the potential for some favorable impacts. The entomologist Chris D. Thomas argues that most introduced species are neutral or beneficial with respect to other species but this is a minority opinion.

Some invasive species can provide a suitable habitat or food source for other organisms. In areas where a native has become extinct or reached a point that it cannot be restored, non-native species can fill their role despite having negative impacts elsewhere. For instance, in the US, the southwestern willow flycatcher (Empidonax traillii) mainly nests in the non-native tamarisk. The introduced mesquite (Neltuma juliflora) is an aggressive invasive species in India, but is the preferred nesting site of native waterbirds in small cities like Udaipur in Rajasthan. Similarly, Ridgway's rail (Rallus obsoletus) has adapted to the invasive hybrid of Spartina alterniflora and Spartina foliosa, which offers better cover and nesting habitat. In Australia, saltwater crocodiles (Crocodylus porosus), which had become endangered, have recovered by feeding on introduced feral pigs (Sus domesticus).

Non-native species can provide ecosystem services, functioning as biocontrol agents to limit the effects of invasive agricultural pests. Some species have invaded an area so long ago that they are considered to have naturalised there. In the US, the endangered Taylor's checkerspot butterfly (Euphydryas editha taylori) has come to rely on invasive ribwort plantain (Plantago lanceolata) as the food plant for its caterpillars.

Some invasions offer potential commercial benefits. For instance, silver carp (Hypophthalmichthys molitrix) and common carp (Cyprinus carpio) can be harvested for human food and exported to markets already familiar with the product, or processed into pet foods or mink feed. Water hyacinth (Pontederia crassipes) can be turned into fuel by methane digesters, and other invasive plants can be harvested and utilized as a source of bioenergy.

== Control, eradication, and study ==
Budget to manage invasive alien species

Humans are versatile enough to remediate adverse effects of species invasions. The public is motivated by invasive species that impact their local area. The control of alien species populations is important in the conservation of biodiversity in natural ecosystem. Previous studies and control programs that target invasives are the most effective during the earlier phases of invasion, such as eliminating founder population quickly before the introduced species can spread. One of the most promising methods for controlling alien species is genetic.

=== Cargo inspection and quarantine ===
The original motivation was to protect against agricultural pests while still allowing the export of agricultural products. In 1994 the first set of global standards were agreed to, including the Agreement on the Application of Sanitary and Phytosanitary Measures (SPS Agreement). These are overseen by the World Trade Organization. The International Maritime Organization oversees the International Convention for the Control and Management of Ships' Ballast Water and Sediments (the Ballast Water Management Convention). Although primarily targeted at other, more general environmental concerns, the Convention on Biological Diversity does specify some steps that its members should take to control invasive species. The CBD is the most significant international agreement on the environmental consequences of invasive species; most such measures are voluntary and unspecific.

=== Slowing spread ===
Firefighters are becoming responsible for decontamination of their own equipment, public water equipment, and private water equipment, due to the risk of aquatic invasive species transfer. In the United States this is especially a concern for wildland firefighters because quagga (Dreissena bugensis) and zebra (Dreissena polymorpha) mussel invasion and wildfires co-occur in the American West.

=== Reestablishing species ===
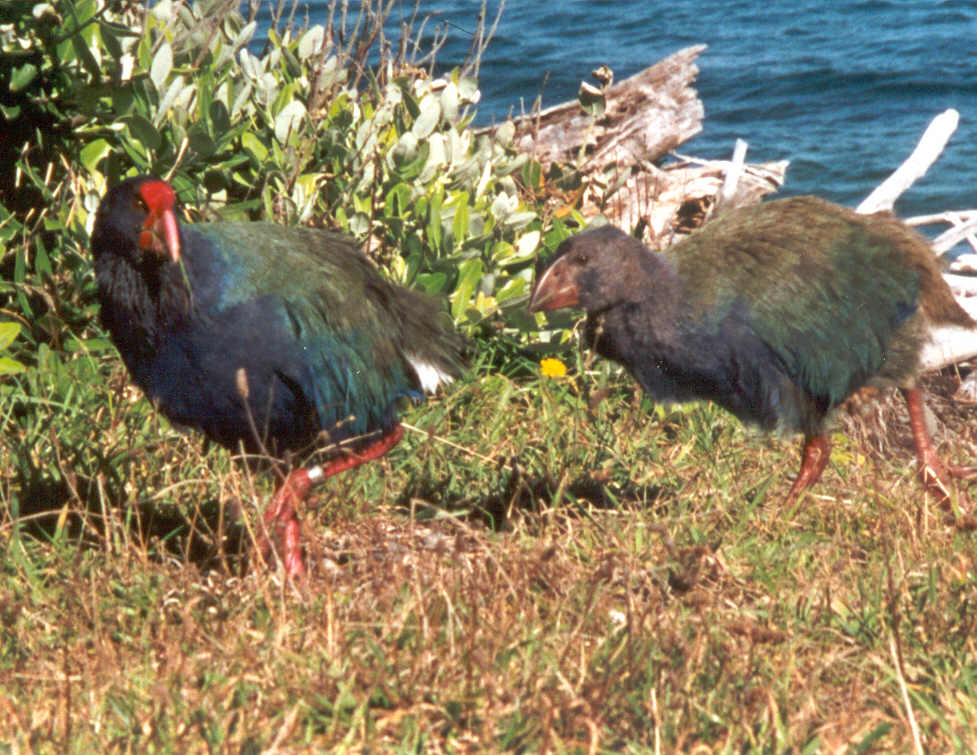
Takahē (Porphyrio hochstetteri) have bred after translocation to restored islands, like these on Kapiti Island, off New Zealand.

Island restoration deals with the eradication of invasive species on islands. A 2019 study suggests that if eradications of invasive animals were conducted on just 169 islands, the survival prospects of 9.4% of the Earth's most highly threatened terrestrial insular vertebrates would be improved.

Invasive vertebrate eradication on islands aligns with United Nations Sustainable Development Goal 15 and associated targets.

Rodents were carried to South Georgia, an island in the southern Atlantic Ocean with no permanent inhabitants, in the 18th century by sealing and whaling ships. They soon wrought havoc on the island's bird population, eating eggs and attacking chicks. In 2018, the South Georgia Island was declared free of invasive rodents after a multi-year extermination effort. Bird populations have rebounded, including the South Georgia pipit (Anthus antarcticus) and South Georgia pintail (Anas georgica georgica), both endemic to the island.

=== Taxon substitution ===
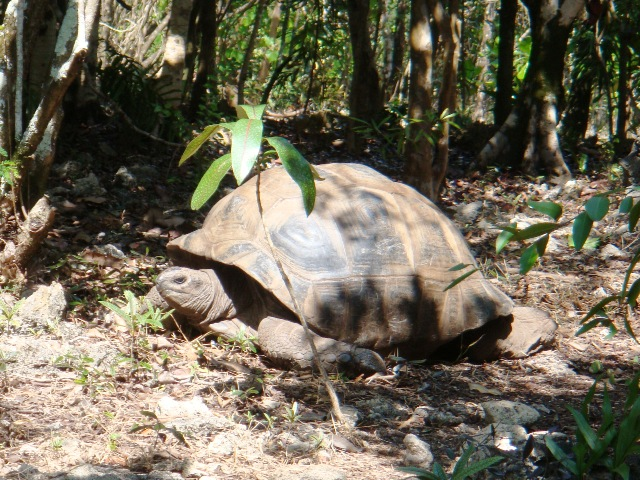
The Aldabra giant tortoise (Aldabrachelys gigantea) has helped to restore ecological equilibrium on two islets off Mauritius, including the Île aux Aigrettes (pictured).

Non-native species can be introduced to fill an ecological engineering role that previously was performed by a native species now extinct. The procedure is known as taxon substitution. On many islands, tortoise extinction has resulted in dysfunctional ecosystems with respect to seed dispersal and herbivory. On the offshore islets of Mauritius, tortoises now extinct had served as the keystone herbivores. Introduction of the non-native Aldabra giant tortoises (Aldabrachelys gigantea) on two islets in 2000 and 2007 has begun to restore ecological equilibrium. The introduced tortoises are dispersing seeds of several native plants and are selectively grazing invasive plant species. Grazing and browsing are expected to replace ongoing intensive manual weeding, and the introduced tortoises are already breeding.

=== By using them as food ===
The practice of eating invasive species to reduce their populations has been explored. In 2005, Chef Bun Lai of Miya's Sushi in New Haven, Connecticut, created the first menu dedicated to invasive species. At that time, half the items on the menu were conceptual because those invasive species were not yet commercially available. By 2013, Miya's offered invasive aquatic species such as Chesapeake blue catfish (Ictalurus furcatus), Florida lionfish (Pterois sp.), Kentucky silver carp (Hypophthalmichthys molitrix), Georgia cannonball jellyfish (Stomolophus meleagris), and invasive plants such as Japanese knotweed (Reynoutria japonica) and autumn olive (Elaeagnus umbellata). Joe Roman, a Harvard and University of Vermont conservation biologist and recipient of the Rachel Carson Environmental award, runs a website named "Eat The Invaders". In the 21st century, organizations including Reef Environmental Educational Foundation and the Institute for Applied Ecology have published cookbooks and recipes using invasive species as ingredients. Invasive plant species have been explored as a sustainable source of beneficial phytochemicals and edible protein.

Proponents of eating invasive organisms argue that humans have the ability to eat away any species that it has an appetite for, pointing to the many animals which humans have been able to hunt to extinction—such as the Caribbean monk seal (Neomonachus tropicalis) and the passenger pigeon (Ectopistes migratorius). They further point to Jamaica's success in significantly decreasing the population of lionfish by encouraging the consumption of the fish. Skeptics point out that once a foreign species has entrenched itself in a new place—such as the Indo-Pacific lionfish that has now virtually taken over the waters of the western Atlantic Ocean, Caribbean and Gulf of Mexico—eradication is almost impossible. Critics argue that encouraging consumption might have the unintended effect of spreading harmful species even more widely.

=== Pesticides and herbicides ===
Pesticides are commonly used to control invasives. Herbicides used against invasive plants include fungal herbicides. Although the effective population size of an introduced population is bottlenecked, some genetic variation has been known to provide invasive plants with resistance against these fungal bioherbicides. Invasive populations of cheatgrass (Bromus tectorum) exist with resistance to Ustilago bullata used as a biocontrol, and a similar problem has been reported in Japanese stiltgrass (Microstegium vimineum) subject to Bipolaris microstegii and B. drechsleri. This is not solely a character of invasive plant genetics but is normal for wild plants such as the weed wild flax (Linum marginale) and its fungal pathogen flax rust (Melampsora lini). Crops have another disadvantage over any uncontrolled plant – wild native or invasive – namely their greater uptake of nutrients, as they are deliberately bred to increase nutrient intake to enable increased product output.

=== Gene drive ===
A gene drive could be used to eliminate invasive species and has, for example, been proposed as a way to eliminate invasive mammal species in New Zealand. Briefly put, an individual of a species may have two versions of a gene, one with a desired coding outcome and one not, with offspring having a 50:50 chance of inheriting one or the other. Genetic engineering can be used to inhibit inheritance of the non-desired gene, resulting in faster propagation of the desired gene in subsequent generations. Gene drives for biodiversity conservation purposes are being explored as part of The Genetic Biocontrol of Invasive Rodents program because they offer the potential for reduced risk to non-target species and reduced costs when compared to traditional invasive species removal techniques. A wider outreach network for gene drive research exists to raise awareness of the value of gene drive research for the public good. Some scientists are concerned that the technique could wipe out species in their original native habitats. The gene could mutate, causing unforeseen problems, or hybridize with native species.

=== Predicting invasive plants ===
Accurately predicting the impacts of non-native plants can be an especially effective management option because most introductions of non-native plant species are intentional. Weed risk assessments attempt to predict the chances that a specific plant will have negative effects in a new environment, often using a standardized questionnaire. The resulting total score is associated with a management action such as "prevent introduction". Assessments commonly use information about the physiology, life history, native ranges, and phylogenetic relationships of the species evaluated. The effectiveness of the approach is debated.

=== Predicting invasive animals ===
Invasive alien animal species can seriously affect human well-being and biodiversity. A hierarchical approach underpins the management measures used to lessen these effects, ranging from invasive species management to invasion prevention through early warning and quick response. Currently, a small number of research on invading mammals have employed spatially explicit models, and the majority of them only looked at a small number of species. The majority of the research employed climate matching to assess the appropriateness of global geographic regions or the potential for established species to spread farther. For species that are not yet established but are anticipated to do so, modelling techniques may be a helpful tool to evaluate the risk of establishment; nevertheless, there aren't many research of this kind for mammals.

=== Returning invasive species to origin country ===
In 2025, for the first time in history, a project to return an invasive species to the country it came from has been started in the Hebrides in Scotland. Hedgehogs "native to the UK mainland" were brought to those islands decades ago to fight garden pests, but the introduction caused severe harm to birds which nested on the ground. The authorities decided to move them back to the mainland, helping the birds without harming the hedgehogs.

=== Government Regulations ===
Government regulations offer another way to eradicate invasive species. The Florida Fish and Wildlife Commission (FWC) sponsors competitions aimed at removing lionfish from Florida waters. The challenge offers divers with prizes contingent on the number of lionfish each competitor successfully removes. Similarly, the FWC encourages local Floridians to collect invasive green iguanas and turn them into local government facilities. When the state undergoes cold snaps, these non-native lizards often freeze and become stunned allowing for the ease of collecting them. The FWC permits the killing of green iguanas year-round to combat the population.

The state of Texas classifies feral hogs as invasive species. As such, hunting of these hogs is permitted and highly encouraged by the Texas government year-round. Methods described by the Texas State Government include trapping, corralling, aerial gunning (high-powered rifles discharged from individuals aboard helicopters), and tracking dogs. Many local governments across Texas also provide bounties that encourage hunters to increase pressure on the feral hog populations.

The state of Idaho classifies walleye as an invasive species in their waters. These predatory fish pose a threat to native aquatic populations. Idaho Fish and Game officials strongly encourage anglers to harvest caught walleye year-round with no limits regarding amount or size. Similarly, the Indiana Department of Natural Resources classifies thirteen species of fish, including bighead carp and walking catfish, as invasive to Indiana waters and finds anglers not in violation of the Exotic Fish Rule only if the fish are killed immediately after being caught.

== Criticisms of the invasive species discourse ==
Scientific Critique

Not all biological invasions are inherently destructive. In modern ecology, the concept of an "effective invasion" describes a scenario where an alien species successfully naturalizes, occupies a vacant ecological niche, and integrates organically into local trophic networks without causing critical competition or displacing native fauna. A classic example is the naturalization of the Black and Caspian Sea sprat (Clupeonella cultriventris) in the Volga and Kama reservoirs, where it filled a vacant pelagic zooplanktivore niche previously occupied by declining native species, ultimately becoming a key food source for native piscivores.

A growing contingent of scientists, ecologists, and animal welfare activists caution utilizing the term 'invasive' for species migrating to new ecosystems. Scientists disclose that climate change has begun pushing species such as white-tailed deer, armadillos, lobsters, unicorn snails, and even maple trees to pursue new ecosystems, a migration necessary to survive hotter temperatures. Rather than labeling these species as invasive, this contingent urges these animals should be welcomed as refugees. The term 'invasive' compares these species to enemies in war which warps the public perception of the innocent animals' livelihood and welfare.

Animal Welfare Critique

Several animal welfare movements have attempted to dissuade the eradication of invasive species. A main point of contention for these activists is the treatment of the invasive species during the eradication process. These proponents argue that the stigma surrounding an invasive species seemingly outweighs the notion that all animals are living beings that deserve respect and care. These activists acknowledge the adverse effects that invasive species have, but find the removal process largely unethical and cruel.

Other animal activists reject the idea of labeling a species as invasive altogether. These activists posit the labeling of a species as 'invasive' constitutes wrongful discrimination that permits systemic violence on the creatures. Proponents of this subset of animal activism profess invasive species labeling is inherently arbitrary and a perpetuator of speciesism, a term coined by Peter Singer to describe the "misguided belief that one species is more important than another." Once a species is determined to be legally invasive, those animals often fail to be protected by anti-cruelty statutes and inhumane killings of the species, like cane toads in Australia, become commonplace.

== See also ==
- Adventive plant
- Archaeophyte
- Climate change and invasive species
- Ecologically based invasive plant management
- Escaped plant
- Hemerochory
- Invasion genetics
- Lists of invasive species
- Naturalisation (biology)
- Neophyte (botany)
- Seed dispersal
- 100 of the World's Worst Invasive Alien Species
