= Invasive Species Forecasting System =

The Invasive Species Forecasting System, or simply ISFS, was a proposed modeling environment for creating predictive habitat suitability maps for invasive species. It was developed by the National Aeronautics and Space Administration (NASA) in cooperation with various Department of Interior bureaus, including the United States Geological Survey (USGS), the Bureau of Land Management (BLM), and the National Park Service (NPS).

As of 26 October 2020 This ISFS website is dead. The development of such a system is still proposed however.
