= Spatial scale =

Spatial scale is a specific application of the term "scale" for describing or categorizing (e.g. into orders of magnitude) the size of a space (hence spatial), or the extent at which a phenomenon or process occurs.

For instance, in physics an object or phenomenon can be called microscopic if too small to be visible. In climatology, a micro-climate is a climate which might occur in a mountain, valley or near a lake shore. In statistics, a megatrend is a political, social, economic, environmental or technological trend which involves the whole planet or is supposed to last a very large amount of time. The concept is also used in geography, astronomy, and meteorology.

These divisions are somewhat arbitrary; where, on this table, mega- is assigned global scope, it may only apply continentally or even regionally in other contexts. The interpretations of meso- and macro- must then be adjusted accordingly.

This animation gives a sense of the scale of some of the known objects in our universe.

Examples of scales in geography and metereology
Scale	Length	Area	Description
Micro	1 m – 1 km	1 m^{2} – 1 km^{2}	local
Meso	1 km - 100 km	1 km^{2} - 10,000 km^{2}	regional
Macro	100 km - 10,000 km	10,000 km^{2} - 100,000,000 km^{2}	continental
Mega	10,000 km - 1,000,000 km	100,000,000 - 10,000,000,000 km^{2}	global
Giga	>1,000,000 km	>10,000,000,000 km^{2}	superglobal

== See also ==
- Astronomical units of length
- Cosmic distance ladder
- List of examples of lengths
- Location of Earth
- Meteorological subdivisions:
  - Microscale meteorology
  - Misoscale meteorology
  - Mesoscale meteorology
  - Synoptic scale meteorology
- Orders of magnitude (length)
- Scale (analytical tool)
- Scale (geography)
- Scale (map)
- Scale (ratio)
