= Scale =

Scale or scales may refer to:

== Mathematics ==
- Scale (descriptive set theory), an object defined on a set of points
- Scale (ratio), the ratio of a linear dimension of a model to the corresponding dimension of the original
- Scale factor, a number which scales, or multiplies, some quantity
- Long and short scales, how powers of ten are named and grouped in large numbers
- Scale parameter, a description of the spread or dispersion of a probability distribution
- Feature scaling, a method used to normalize the range of independent variables or features of data
- Scale (analytical tool)

== Measurements ==
- Scale (map), the ratio of the distance on a map to the corresponding actual distance
- Scale (geography)
- Weighing scale, an instrument used to measure mass
- Scale (ratio), the ratio of the linear dimension of the model to the same dimension of the original
- Spatial scale, a classification of sizes
- Scale ruler, a tool for measuring lengths and transferring measurements at a fixed ratio of length
- Vernier scale, the scale on calipers

== Music ==
- Scale (music), a sequence of ordered musical notes
- Scale (string instruments), the sounding length of the strings of an instrument
- Scale (album), a 2006 album by electronic artist Matthew Herbert
- "The Scale", a song from Our Love to Admire by Interpol

== Film and television ==
- Scale (film), an animated short film directed by Joseph Pierce
- Scales (film), a 2019 Saudi Arabian film
- "Scales" (The Cape), a 2011 television episode

== Science ==
=== Biology ===
- Scale (zoology), a rigid plate which grows out of the skin of various animals
  - Fish scale
  - Reptile scale
    - Snake scale
- Scale (dermatology), a secondary skin lesion in humans that resembles animal scales
- Scale (insect anatomy), a feature of the wings of moths and butterflies
- Scale, a type of trichome, any flat epidermal outgrowth in botany
- Bulb scale, the storage layers of a plant bulb
- Scale insect, a waxy coated animal that resembles a fish scale

=== Chemistry and materials science ===
- Fouling, sometimes called scale, a buildup of unwanted substances on a submerged surface
- Limescale, a hard, chalky deposit that often builds up inside kettles, hot water boilers, and pipework
- Mill scale, the flaky surface on hot rolled steel, consisting of iron oxides
- Scale (chemistry), the range of mass or volume of a chemical reaction or process

=== Social sciences ===
- Rating scale, a type of informational measurement scale
- Scale (analytical tool), a concept in the study of complex systems and hierarchy theory
- Scale (social sciences), a tool for ordering entities by quantitative attributes

== Places ==
- Scales, California, a community in the United States
- Scales, Lancashire, part of the village of Newton-with-Scales
- Scales, near Kirkoswald, Cumbria, a hamlet
- Scales, Aldingham, Cumbria, England, a village
- The Scales, the initial climb of the Chilkoot Pass

== Other uses ==
- Scales (surname)
- Baron Scales, a title in the Peerage of England
- Libra (constellation), also known as "the scales", or the namesake astrological sign
- Mizan (Scale in English), a treatise on Islam by Javed Ahmed Ghamidi
- Pay scale, a system or structure of compensation for work
- Scale armour, an early form of armor
- Southern California Linux Expo, an open-source software conference held in Los Angeles, California
- Scale (novel), science fiction novel by Greg Egan

== See also ==
- Scala (disambiguation)
- Scalability, a concept in business, computer science, and electronics
- Scali (disambiguation)
- Scaling (disambiguation)
