= Scaling function =

Scaling function may refer to:

- Critical exponent § Scaling functions
- Wavelet § Scaling function
