= Scaling (geometry) =

Geometric transformation

Each iteration of the Sierpinski triangle contains triangles related to the next iteration by a scale factor of 1/2

Dilation of a square by a constant $K > 1$ and contraction of this same square by a constant $0 < k < 1$.

In affine geometry, uniform scaling (or isotropic scaling) is a linear transformation that enlarges (increases) or shrinks (diminishes) objects by a scale factor that is the same in all directions (isotropically). The result of uniform scaling is similar (in the geometric sense) to the original. A scale factor of 1 is normally allowed, so that congruent shapes are also classed as similar. Uniform scaling happens, for example, when enlarging or reducing a photograph, or when creating a scale model of a building, car, airplane, etc.

More general is scaling with a separate scale factor for each axis direction. Non-uniform scaling (anisotropic scaling) is obtained when at least one of the scaling factors is different from the others; a special case is directional scaling or stretching (in one direction). Non-uniform scaling changes the shape of the object; e.g. a square may change into a rectangle, or into a parallelogram if the sides of the square are not parallel to the scaling axes (the angles between lines parallel to the axes are preserved, but not all angles). It occurs, for example, when a faraway billboard is viewed from an oblique angle, or when the shadow of a flat object falls on a surface that is not parallel to it.

When the scale factor is larger than 1, (uniform or non-uniform) scaling is sometimes also called dilation or enlargement. When the scale factor is a positive number smaller than 1, scaling is sometimes also called contraction or reduction.

In the most general sense, a scaling includes the case in which the directions of scaling are not perpendicular. It also includes the case in which one or more scale factors are equal to zero (projection), and the case of one or more negative scale factors (a directional scaling by -1 is equivalent to a reflection).

Scaling is a linear transformation, and a special case of homothetic transformation (scaling about a point). In most cases, the homothetic transformations are non-linear transformations.

== Uniform scaling ==
A scale factor is usually a decimal which scales, or multiplies, some quantity. In the equation y = Cx, C is the scale factor for x. C is also the coefficient of x, and may be called the constant of proportionality of y to x. For example, doubling distances corresponds to a scale factor of two for distance, while cutting a cake in half results in pieces with a scale factor for volume of one half. The basic equation for it is image over preimage.

In the field of measurements, the scale factor of an instrument is sometimes referred to as sensitivity. The ratio of any two corresponding lengths in two similar geometric figures is also called a scale.

== Matrix representation ==
A scaling can be represented by a scaling matrix. To scale an object by a vector v = (v_{x}, v_{y}, v_{z}), each point p = (p_{x}, p_{y}, p_{z}) would need to be multiplied with this scaling matrix:

$$S_v =
\begin{bmatrix}
v_x & 0 & 0  \\
0 & v_y & 0  \\
0 & 0 & v_z  \\
\end{bmatrix}.$$

As shown below, the multiplication will give the expected result:

$$S_vp =
\begin{bmatrix}
v_x & 0 & 0  \\
0 & v_y & 0  \\
0 & 0 & v_z  \\
\end{bmatrix}
\begin{bmatrix}
p_x \\ p_y \\ p_z
\end{bmatrix}
=
\begin{bmatrix}
v_xp_x \\ v_yp_y \\ v_zp_z
\end{bmatrix}.$$

Such a scaling changes the diameter of an object by a factor between the scale factors, the area by a factor between the smallest and the largest product of two scale factors, and the volume by the product of all three.

The scaling is uniform if and only if the scaling factors are equal (v_{x} = v_{y} = v_{z}). If all except one of the scale factors are equal to 1, we have directional scaling.

In the case where v_{x} = v_{y} = v_{z} = k, scaling increases the area of any surface by a factor of k^{2} and the volume of any solid object by a factor of k^{3}.

=== Scaling in arbitrary dimensions ===
In $n$-dimensional space $\mathbb{R}^n$, uniform scaling by a factor $v$ is accomplished by scalar multiplication with $v$, that is, multiplying each coordinate of each point by $v$. As a special case of linear transformation, it can be achieved also by multiplying each point (viewed as a column vector) with a diagonal matrix whose entries on the diagonal are all equal to $v$, namely $v I$ .

Non-uniform scaling is accomplished by multiplication with any symmetric matrix. The eigenvalues of the matrix are the scale factors, and the corresponding eigenvectors are the axes along which each scale factor applies. A special case is a diagonal matrix, with arbitrary numbers $v_1,v_2,\ldots v_n$ along the diagonal: the axes of scaling are then the coordinate axes, and the transformation scales along each axis $i$ by the factor $v_i$.

In uniform scaling with a non-zero scale factor, all non-zero vectors retain their direction (as seen from the origin), or all have the direction reversed, depending on the sign of the scaling factor. In non-uniform scaling only the vectors that belong to an eigenspace will retain their direction. A vector that is the sum of two or more non-zero vectors belonging to different eigenspaces will be tilted towards the eigenspace with largest eigenvalue.

== Using homogeneous coordinates ==
In projective geometry, often used in computer graphics, points are represented using homogeneous coordinates. To scale an object by a vector v = (v_{x}, v_{y}, v_{z}), each homogeneous coordinate vector p = (p_{x}, p_{y}, p_{z}, 1) would need to be multiplied with this projective transformation matrix:

$$S_v =
\begin{bmatrix}
v_x & 0 & 0 & 0 \\
0 & v_y & 0 & 0 \\
0 & 0 & v_z & 0 \\
0 & 0 & 0 & 1
\end{bmatrix}.$$

As shown below, the multiplication will give the expected result:

$$S_vp =
\begin{bmatrix}
v_x & 0 & 0 & 0 \\
0 & v_y & 0 & 0 \\
0 & 0 & v_z & 0 \\
0 & 0 & 0 & 1
\end{bmatrix}
\begin{bmatrix}
p_x \\ p_y \\ p_z \\ 1
\end{bmatrix}
=
\begin{bmatrix}
v_xp_x \\ v_yp_y \\ v_zp_z \\ 1
\end{bmatrix}.$$

Since the last component of a homogeneous coordinate can be viewed as the denominator of the other three components, a uniform scaling by a common factor s (uniform scaling) can be accomplished by using this scaling matrix:

$$S_v =
\begin{bmatrix}
1 & 0 & 0 & 0 \\
0 & 1 & 0 & 0 \\
0 & 0 & 1 & 0 \\
0 & 0 & 0 & \frac{1}{s}
\end{bmatrix}.$$

For each vector p = (p_{x}, p_{y}, p_{z}, 1) we would have

$$S_vp =
\begin{bmatrix}
1 & 0 & 0 & 0 \\
0 & 1 & 0 & 0 \\
0 & 0 & 1 & 0 \\
0 & 0 & 0 & \frac{1}{s}
\end{bmatrix}
\begin{bmatrix}
p_x \\ p_y \\ p_z \\ 1
\end{bmatrix}
=
\begin{bmatrix}
p_x \\ p_y \\ p_z \\ \frac{1}{s}
\end{bmatrix}
,$$

which would be equivalent to

$$\begin{bmatrix}
sp_x \\ sp_y \\ sp_z \\ 1
\end{bmatrix}.$$

== Function dilation and contraction ==
Given a point $P(x,y)$, the dilation associates it with the point $P'(x',y')$ through the equations

$$\begin{cases}x'=mx \\ y'=ny\end{cases}$$
for $m,n \in \R^+$.

Therefore, given a function $y=f(x)$, the equation of the dilated function is

$$y=nf\left(\frac{x}{m}\right).$$

=== Particular cases ===
- If $n=1$, the transformation is horizontal; when $m > 1$, it is a dilation, when $m < 1$, it is a contraction.
- If $m=1$, the transformation is vertical; when $n>1$ it is a dilation, when $n<1$, it is a contraction.
- If m × n = 1, the transformation is a squeeze mapping.

== See also ==
- 2D computer graphics#Scaling
- Digital zoom
- Dilation (metric space)
- Homogeneous function
- Homothetic transformation
- Orthogonal coordinates
- Scalar (mathematics)
- Scale (disambiguation)
  - Scale (ratio)
  - Scale (map)
- Scale factor (computer science)
- Scale factor (cosmology)
- Scales of scale models
- Scaling in statistical estimation
- Scaling in gravity
- Transformation matrix
- Image scaling
