= Scala =

Scala or SCALA may refer to:

== Automobiles ==
- Renault Scala, multiple automobile models
- Škoda Scala, a Czech compact hatchback

== Music ==
- Scala (band), an English electronic music group
- Escala (group), an electronic string quartet formerly known as Scala
- La Scala (album), an album by Keith Jarrett
- Scala, an album by This Heat
- Scala & Kolacny Brothers, a Belgian women's choir
- Scala Records, a 1911–27 British record label
- Scala Radio, a classical music digital radio station launched in 2019
- SCALA (Songwriters, Composers, and Lyricists Association) - see Adelaide music organizations

== Organizations ==
- Scala (company), video software company
- SCALA, the student chapter of the American Library Association

== People ==
- Alessandra Scala (1475–1506), Italian poet and scholar
- Bartolomeo Scala (1430–1497), Italian politician, author and historian
- Delia Scala (1929–2004), Italian ballerina and actress
- Enea Scala (born 1979), Italian operatic tenor
- Flaminio Scala (1547–1624), Italian actor
- Flavio Scala (born 1945), Italian yacht racer
- Gaetano Scala (born 1932), Italian pentathlete
- Gia Scala (1934–1972), Anglo-American actress
- Jerry Scala (1924–1993), American baseball player
- Lauren Scala (born 1982), American television reporter
- Mim Scala (born 1940), English talent agent
- Nevio Scala (born 1947), Italian soccer coach
- Salvatore Scala (1944–2008), New York mobster
- Santiago Scala (born 1991), Argentine basketball player
- Tina Scala (1935–2022), Italian-American actress
- Vincenzo Scala (fl. 1839–1893), Italian painter

== Places and buildings ==
=== Australia ===
- La Scala, Fortitude Valley, heritage-listed house in Brisbane, Australia

=== Italy ===
- La Scala, an opera house in Milan, Italy
- La Scala, San Miniato, a village in the province of Pisa, Italy
- Scala, Campania, a village on the Amalfi Coast in Italy

=== Thailand ===
- Scala Cinema (Bangkok), a cinema (movie theater) in Bangkok, Thailand

=== United Kingdom ===
- Scala (club), a nightclub in London
- Scala Theatre, a 1772–1969 theatre in London
- The Scala (Oxford), later Phoenix Picturehouse cinema, Oxford, England
- The Scala Picture House (1912–2008), later Cine City, Withington, Manchester, England

== Science and technology ==
=== Computing ===
- FF Scala (1990), a typeface by Martin Majoor
  - FF Scala Sans (1993), a typeface by Martin Majoor
- Scala (programming language), a functional/object-oriented programming language
- Scala (software), a program for creating musical scales
- Scala (company), multimedia software

=== Species ===
- Trigonostoma scala a species of sea snail in the family Cancellariidae
- Turbonilla scala, a species of sea snail in the family Pyramidellidae
- Veprecula scala, a species of sea snail in the family Raphitomidae

== Other uses ==
- Scala!!!, a 2023 film by Ali Catterall and Jane Giles
- Scala case, a 1978 fire in Barcelona and the ensuing trial

== See also ==
- Scalar (disambiguation)
- Scale (disambiguation)
- Scali (disambiguation)
- Skala (disambiguation)
- Escala (disambiguation)
