= Skala =

Skala may refer to:

== Places ==
=== Greece ===
- Skala, Patmos, the main port on the island of Patmos in Greece
- Skala, Laconia, a municipality in southern Greece
- Skala, Xanthi, a settlement in north-eastern Greece
- Skala, Cephalonia, a resort in the Ionian Islands

=== Elsewhere ===
- Skała (disambiguation), several places in Poland
- Skala-Podilska, a town in Ukraine
- Skala, Burgas Province, a village in Burgas Province, south-eastern Bulgaria
- Skala, Silistra Province, a village in Dulovo Municipality, Silistra Province, north-eastern Bulgaria
- Skála, a village in the Faroe Islands
- Skåla (disambiguation), places in Norway
- Skala, a neighbourhood of Larnaca, Cyprus

== Other uses ==
- SKALA, the process computer for the Chernobyl-type nuclear power plants
- Skala (surname)
- Skala Battalion, an assault battalion of the Ukrainian Ground Forces
- Skala (sports organization), a Jewish Communist sports organization in interbellum Poland
- Skala, a 2011 album by Mathias Eick
- Zastava Skala, a subcompact car made by Serbian manufacturer Zastava

== See also ==
- Scala (disambiguation)
