= Škoda Kamiq =

Subcompact crossover SUV produced by Škoda Auto

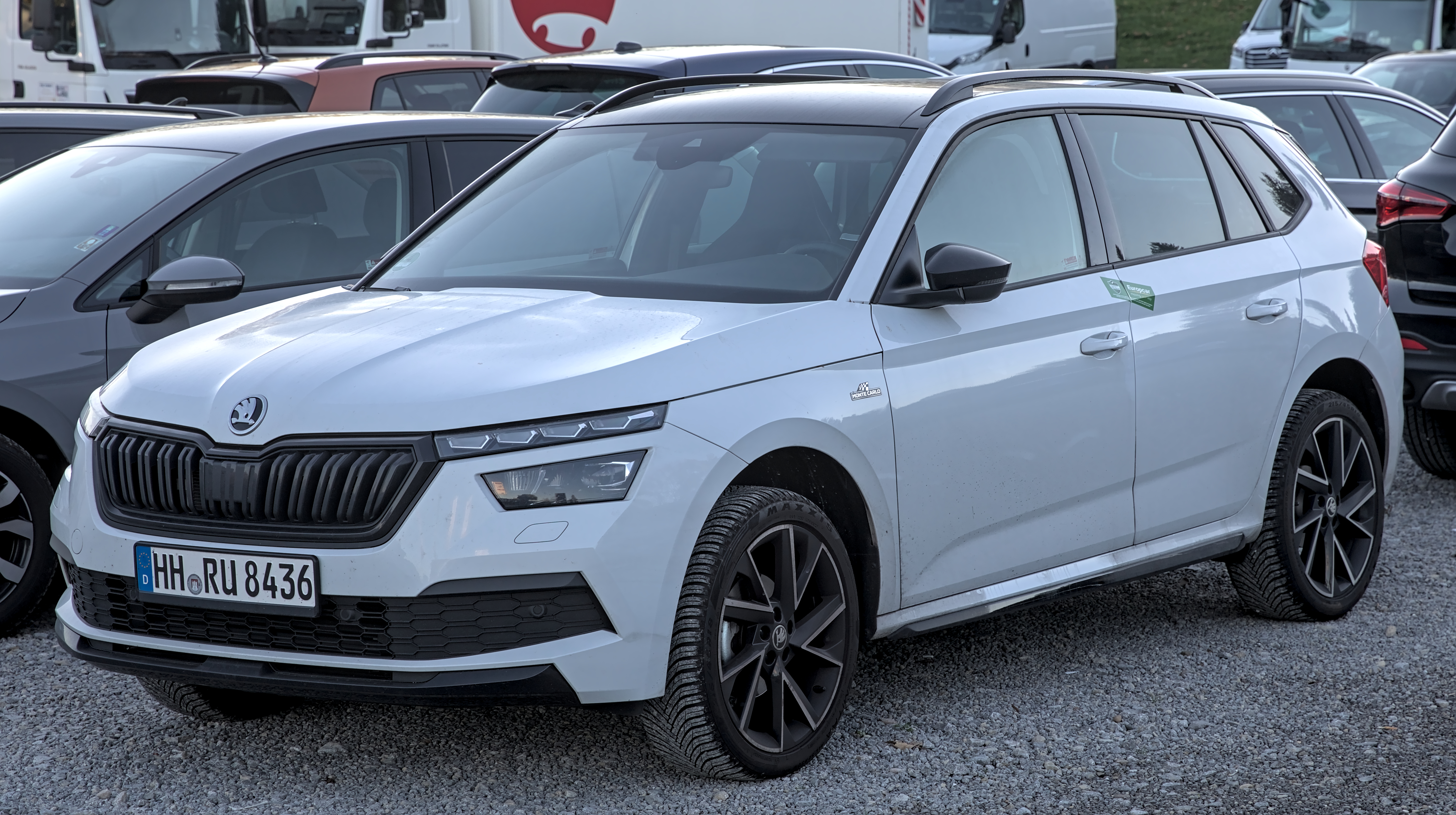
- 2019 Škoda Kamiq

Overview
- Manufacturer: Škoda Auto
- Model code: NW4
- Production: July 2019–present
- Assembly: Czech Republic: Mladá Boleslav
- Designer: Antti Savio

Body and chassis
- Class: Subcompact crossover SUV (B)
- Body style: 5-door SUV
- Layout: Front-engine, front-wheel-drive
- Platform: Volkswagen Group MQB A0
- Related: Škoda Scala; Volkswagen T-Cross; Volkswagen Polo Mk6; Volkswagen Virtus; SEAT Arona; Škoda Kushaq

Powertrain
- Engine: Petrol: 1.0 L 95 TSI I3; 1.0 L 115 TSI I3; 1.5 L 150 TSI Evo I4; Diesel: 1.6 L 115 TDI I4; Petrol/CNG: 1.0 L 90 TGI I3
- Transmission: 5-speed manual 6-speed manual 7-speed DSG

Dimensions
- Wheelbase: 2,651 mm (104.4 in)
- Length: 4,241 mm (167.0 in)
- Width: 1,793 mm (70.6 in)
- Height: 1,553 mm (61.1 in)

The Škoda Kamiq is a subcompact crossover SUV (B-segment) produced by the Czech car manufacturer Škoda Auto since 2019. It is the smallest of the Škoda SUVs, namely the Karoq, Enyaq, and Kodiaq. Deliveries officially started in September 2019. It is based on the concept Vision X, which Škoda first introduced to the public in 2018. As with the Karoq and Kodiaq, the Kamiq name is based on a word from the Inuit language.

== Overview ==
The vehicle debuted at the February 2019 Geneva Auto Show, before its market release in June 2019. While it takes styling cues from both the Karoq and Kodiaq to ensure a continuity between Skoda's SUVs, the Kamiq has several distinctive features, including a more upright grille and an optional narrow LED running lights. As with the new Scala, the boot displays the Skoda name in letters instead of the circular Skoda logo.

The car is built on the Volkswagen Group MQB A0 platform used by the SEAT Arona and Volkswagen T-Cross, while offering more interior space than both. Škoda claims that the Kamiq has more rear legroom than in the Octavia and Karoq. The Kamiq is only offered with front-wheel drive since it is aimed primarily to families in urban areas and the MQB A0 platform that it uses does not support all-wheel drive drivetrain.

The global version of the Kamiq is unrelated to the Chinese market Kamiq, as the latter is larger and built on an older platform, but Škoda used the Kamiq name for both models as they are the smallest SUVs it offers in each market.

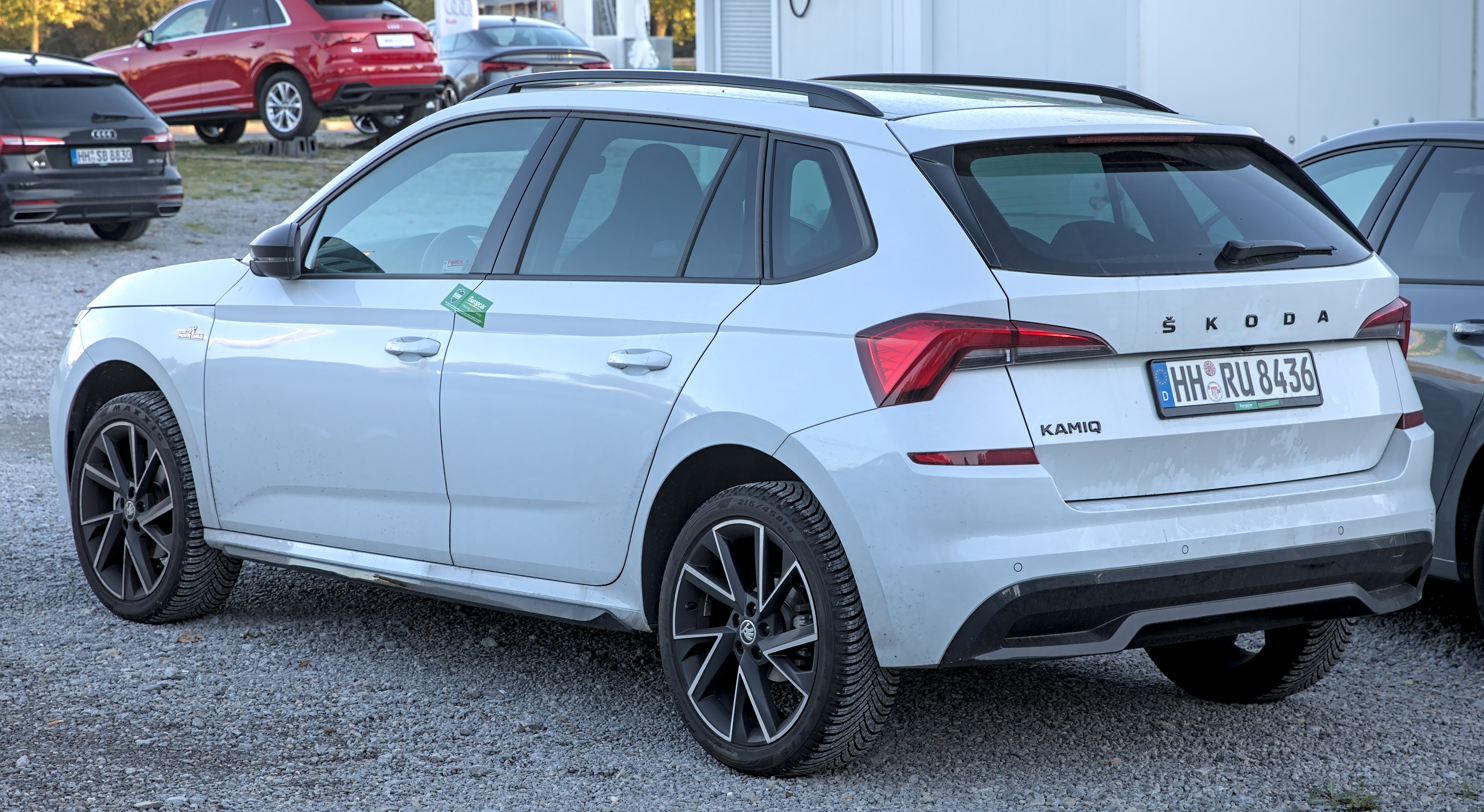
Rear view

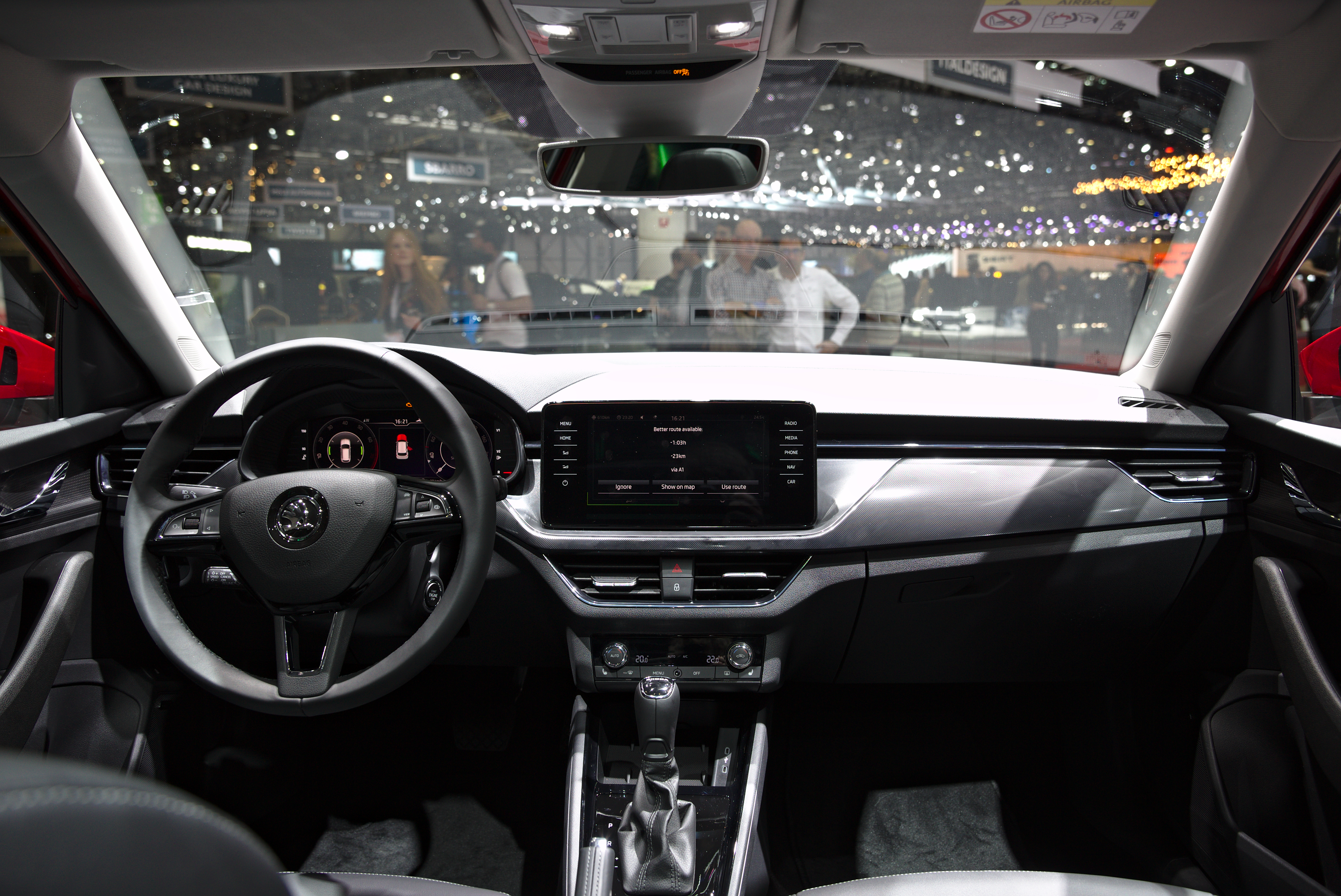
Interior

=== Facelift ===
A facelift was unveiled in August 2023 alongside the Scala. The changes include redesigned front and rear fascias with new L-shaped rear reflectors and the availability of matrix LED headlights, new exterior colours and new alloy wheel designs. Inside, there is a redesigned control panel used to operate the HVAC system, more recycled materials used for the interior improvised standard interior equipment across the line-up, and extra Simply Clever features borrowed from other Škoda models. Škoda has also updated the trim structure and diesel engines are no longer available for the facelift model.

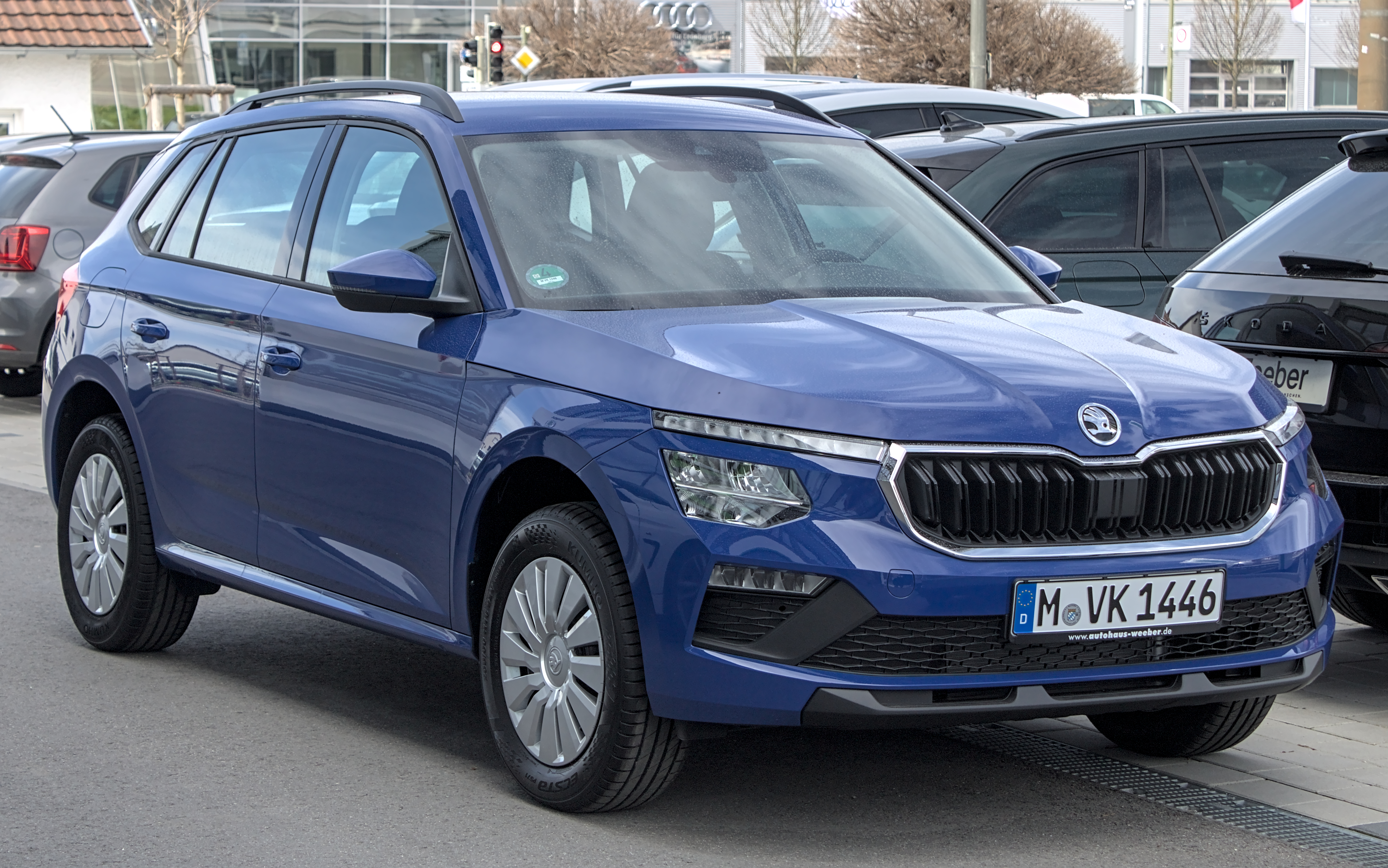
2024 Škoda Kamiq

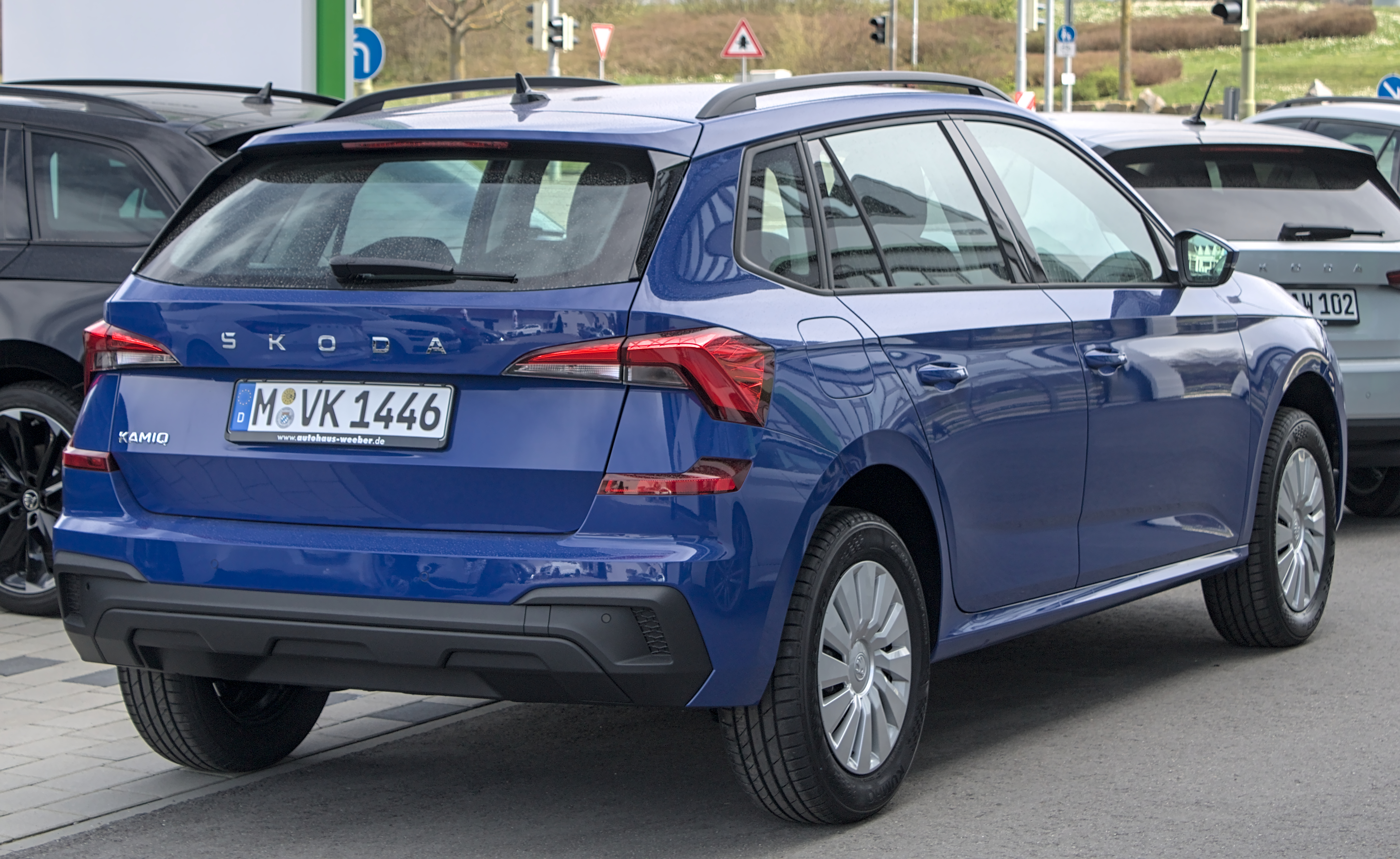
Rear view

=== Safety ===
Euro NCAP test results Škoda Kamiq 1.0 petrol 'Ambition' (LHD) (2019)
Test	Points	%
Overall:	5 /5 stars	
Adult occupant:	36.7	96%
Child occupant:	41.9	85%
Pedestrian:	38.4	80%
Safety assist:	10	76%

ANCAP test results Skoda Kamiq (2019, aligned with Euro NCAP)
Test	Points	%
Overall:	5 /5 stars	
Adult occupant:	36.6	96%
Child occupant:	42.8	87%
Pedestrian:	38.4	80%
Safety assist:	9.9	76%

== Powertrain ==
Five engine options are available for the Kamiq. The entry-level engine is a 1.0-litre TSI delivering 95 PS (70 kW; 94 hp) and produces maximum torque of 175 N⋅m (129 lb⋅ft). Another 1.0-litre TSI engine has a power output of 115 PS (85 kW; 113 hp), and generates torque of 200 N⋅m (148 lb⋅ft). The range-topping engine is the 4-cylinder 1.5-litre TSI with a power output of 150 PS (110 kW; 148 hp) and 250 N⋅m (184 lb⋅ft) of torque with an Active Cylinder Technology (ACT) which automatically shuts down two cylinders to save fuel.

The 4-cylinder 1.6-litre TDI diesel engine delivering 115 PS (85 kW; 113 hp) offers torque of 250 N⋅m (184 lb⋅ft). It is fitted with an SCR catalytic converter with AdBlue injection and a diesel particulate filter as standard. The CNG engine is a 1.0 G-Tec which has a power output of 90 PS (66 kW; 89 hp) and maximum torque of 145 N⋅m (107 lb⋅ft).

Petrol engines
Model	Displacement	Power	Torque	Transmission
1.0 TSI 95	999 cc I3	95 PS (70 kW; 94 hp)	175 N⋅m (129 lb⋅ft)	5-speed manual
1.0 TSI 110 Evo	999 cc I3	110 PS (81 kW; 108 hp)	200 N⋅m (148 lb⋅ft)	6-speed manual or 7-speed DSG
1.0 TSI 115	999 cc I3	115 PS (85 kW; 113 hp)	200 N⋅m (148 lb⋅ft)	6-speed manual or 7-speed DSG
1.5 TSI 150 Evo	1,498 cc I4	150 PS (110 kW; 148 hp)	250 N⋅m (184 lb⋅ft)	6-speed manual or 7-speed DSG
Diesel engine
1.6 TDI 115	1,598 cc I4	115 PS (85 kW; 113 hp)	250 N⋅m (184 lb⋅ft)	5-speed manual or 7-speed DSG
Petrol/CNG engine
1.0 G-Tec 90	999 cc I3	90 PS (66 kW; 89 hp)	145 N⋅m (107 lb⋅ft)	6-speed manual

== Sales ==
Year	Europe (Note: Europe: 2020 EU 27 + UK + Switzerland + Norway + Iceland)	Turkey
2019	12,215	
2020	75,559	
2021	82,461	4,212
2022		3,839
2023		
2024		9,280
2025		
