= Skala (surname) =

Skala is a Slavic surname. The surname may appear as:

- Skála (feminine: Skálová) in the Czech Republic
- Skala (feminine: Skalová) in Slovakia
- Skała in Poland

== People ==
=== Skála, Skálová ===
- František Skála (born 1956), Czech artist
- Jaroslav Skála (1916–2007), Czech psychiatrist
- Jaroslav Skála (basketball) (1954), Czech basketball player
- Jiří Skála (1973), Czech footballer
- Josef Skála (born 1952), Czech politician
- Marek Skála (born 1989), Czech skier
- Viktor Skála (born 1968), Czech actor
- Zuzana Skálová (born 1945), Czech historian

=== Skala ===
- Brian Skala (born 1981), American actor
- Hugo Skala (1875–1952), Austrian entomologist
- Jan Skala (1889–1945), Sorbian journalist
- Steven Skala (1955), Australian investment banker
