= Scalar =

Scalar may refer to:

- Scalar (mathematics), an element of a field, which is used to define a vector space, usually the field of real numbers
- Scalar (physics), a physical quantity that can be described by a single element of a number field such as a real number
  - Lorentz scalar, a quantity in the theory of relativity which is invariant under a Lorentz transformation
  - Pseudoscalar, a quantity that behaves like a scalar, except that it changes sign under a parity inversion
  - Scalar boson, a boson subatomic particle whose spin equals zero
- Scalar (computing), any non-composite value

== See also ==
- dot product, also known as scalar product
- dimensionless quantity, also known as scalar quantity
- Inner product space
- Scalar field
- Scale (music)
- Scaler (disambiguation)
- Pterophyllum scalare (Lichtenstein, 1823), a species of freshwater angelfish
- Scala (disambiguation)
