= Scali =

Scali may refer to:

- Scali bread, an Italian style of bread made predominantly in the area of Boston, Massachusetts, U.S.
- Scali family, one of the three leading Florentine banking families in the Middle Ages

== See also ==
- Scala (disambiguation)
- Scale (disambiguation)
