= Skåla =

Skåla may refer to:

- Skåla (Møre og Romsdal), a mountain in Volda municipality, Møre og Romsdal county, Norway
- Skåla (Vestland), a mountain in Stryn municipality, Vestland county, Norway

== See also ==
- Skála, a village in the Faroe Islands
- Skala (disambiguation)
