= Escala =

Escala may refer to:

== Geography ==
- Escala, Hautes-Pyrénées, a commune in the Hautes-Pyrénées department in southwestern France
- Escala (Seattle) a building in Washington, United States
- L'Escala, a municipality in the comarca of the Alt Empordà in Girona, Catalonia, Spain

== People ==
- Erasmo Escala (1826–1884), Chilean soldier and commander-in-chief of the army
- Pato Escala Pierart, Chilean animator and film producer
- Jaume Perich Escala (1941–1995), Spanish writer, cartoonist and humorist, better known as El Perich

== Music ==
- Escala nordestina (Portuguese: "Northeastern scale") musical scales commonly used in the music of the Nordeste
- Escala (group), an electronic string quartet from London, England
  - Escala (album), their 2009 self-titled debut album

== Other uses ==
- Cadillac Escala, a concept car built by Cadillac in 2016
- Escala (cockroach), a genus of cockroaches
- The discontinued Escala line of RISC-based servers from Groupe Bull
- Escala i corda, a variant of the handball sport of Valencian pilota

== See also ==
- Scala (disambiguation)
- Scale (disambiguation)
