= Scaler =

Scaler may refer to:

- Periodontal scaler, an anti-plaque tool
- Video scaler, a system which converts video signals from one resolution to another
- Scaler (video game), a 2004 video game
- Fish scaler, a food preparation utensil

== See also ==
- Scalar (disambiguation)
