= Škoda Kamiq (China) =

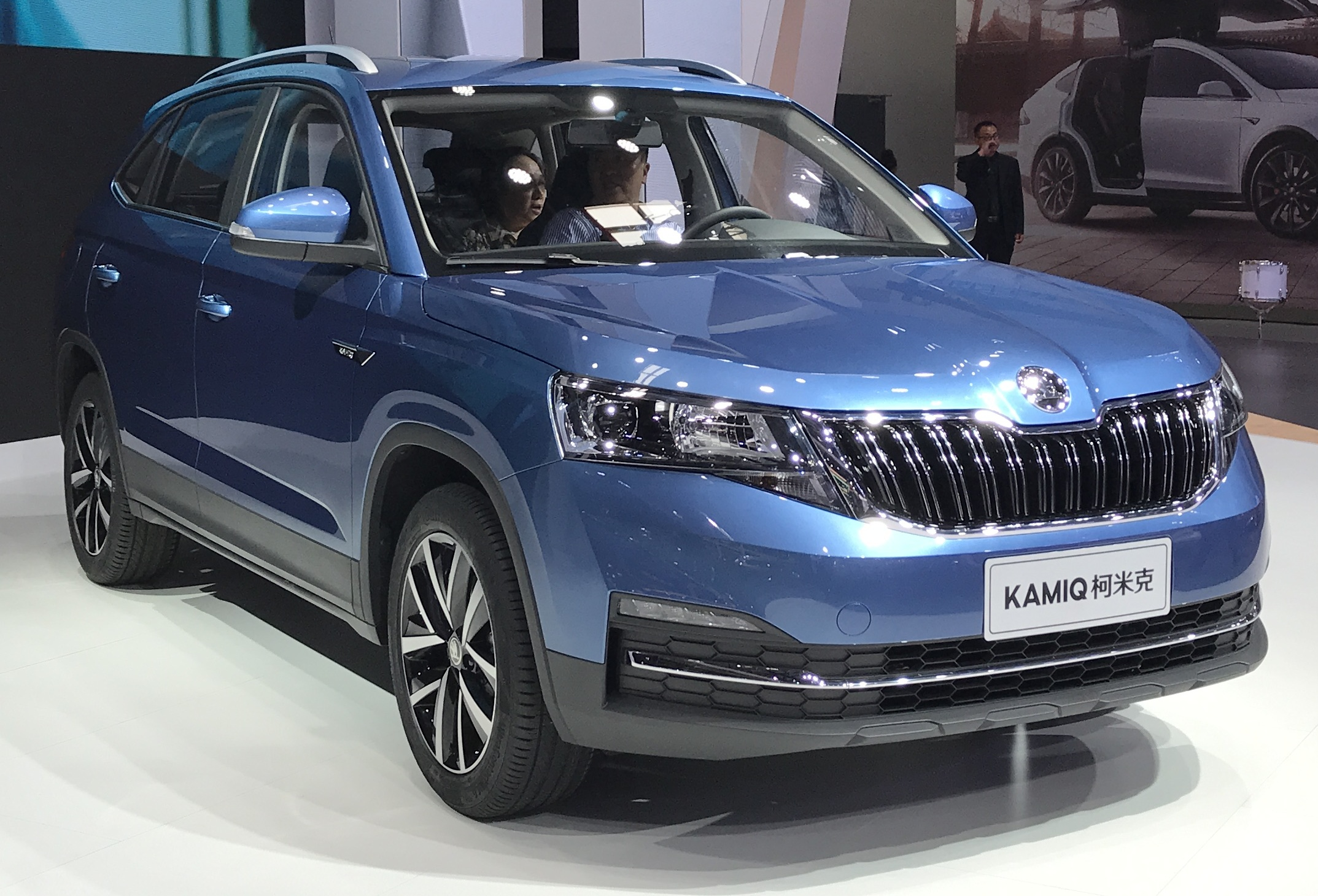

Overview
- Manufacturer: Škoda Auto
- Production: 2018–2026
- Assembly: China: Nanjing, Jiangsu (SAIC-VW)

Body and chassis
- Class: Subcompact crossover SUV (B)
- Body style: 5-door SUV
- Layout: Front-engine, front-wheel-drive
- Platform: Volkswagen Group PQ34

Powertrain
- Engine: 1.2 L TSI I4 (petrol, Kamiq GT); 1.5 L MPI I4 (petrol)
- Transmission: 5-speed manual 6-speed automatic 7-speed DSG (Kamiq GT)

Dimensions
- Wheelbase: 2,610 mm (102.8 in)
- Length: 4,390 mm (172.8 in) (Kamiq); 4,409 mm (173.6 in) (Kamiq GT)
- Width: 1,781 mm (70.1 in)
- Height: 1,606 mm (63.2 in)

The Škoda Kamiq is a subcompact crossover SUV that was designed and built in China by the SAIC-Volkswagen joint venture of the Czech car manufacturer Škoda Auto.

== Overview ==
The Škoda Kamiq in China was introduced at the 2018 Beijing Auto Show in April 2018, and launched in June 2018, positioned below the Škoda Karoq compact crossover SUV. This version is slightly larger than the European version. A single engine variant is offered: a 1.5-litre 110 PS (108 hp; 81 kW) with a 6-speed automatic transmission.

Just like the Škoda Kodiaq GT, a sportier version called the Škoda Kamiq GT was available from 2019, featuring a redesigned front fascia and sleeker rear body section. The Kamiq GT has the same 1.5 liter engine as the regular Kamiq and an additional 1.2-litre TSI 116 PS (114 hp; 85 kW) engine with a 6-speed automatic or 7-speed DSG transmission.

In March 2026, Škoda ended vehicle production in China.

Škoda Kamiq

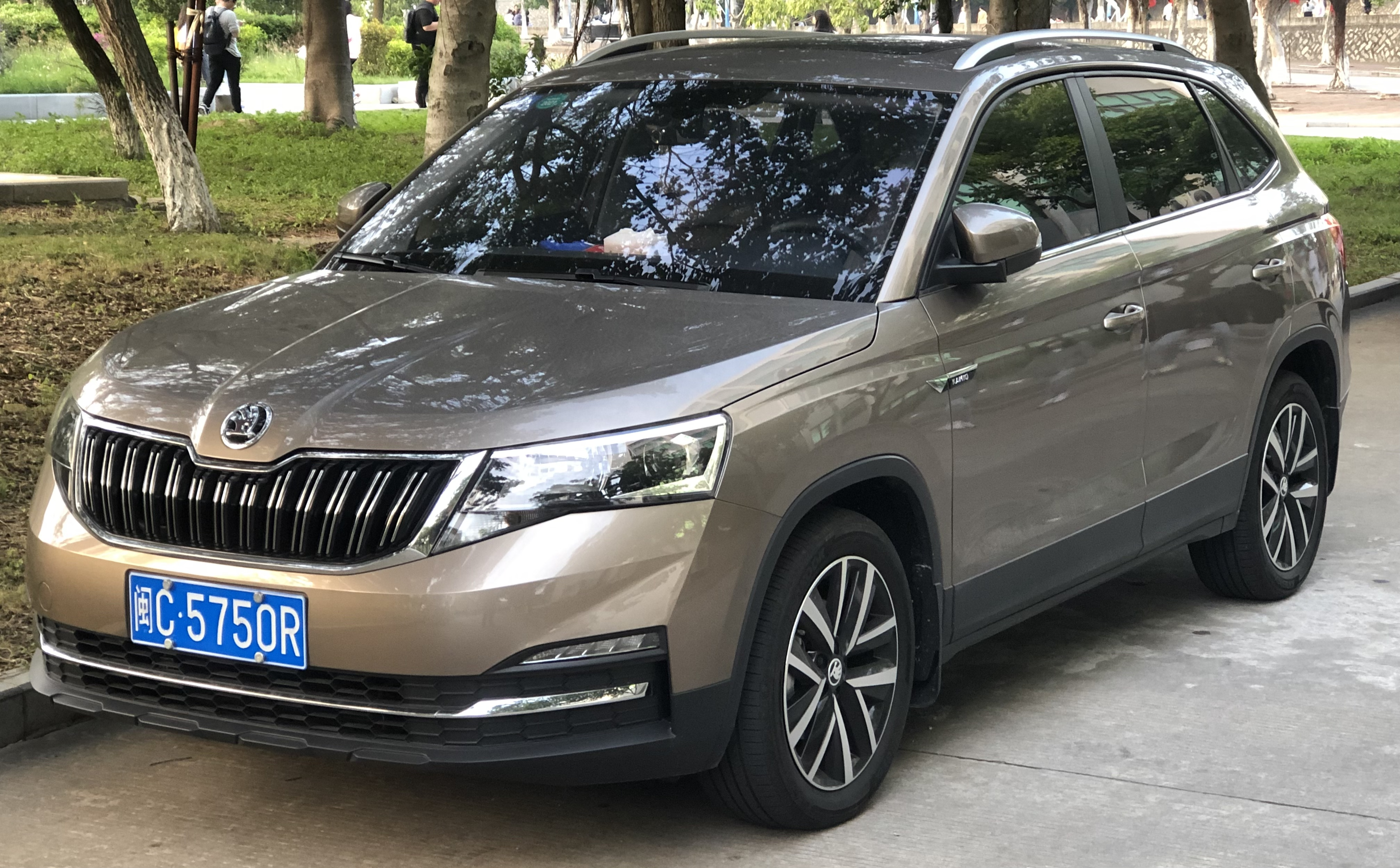
Škoda Kamiq (front)

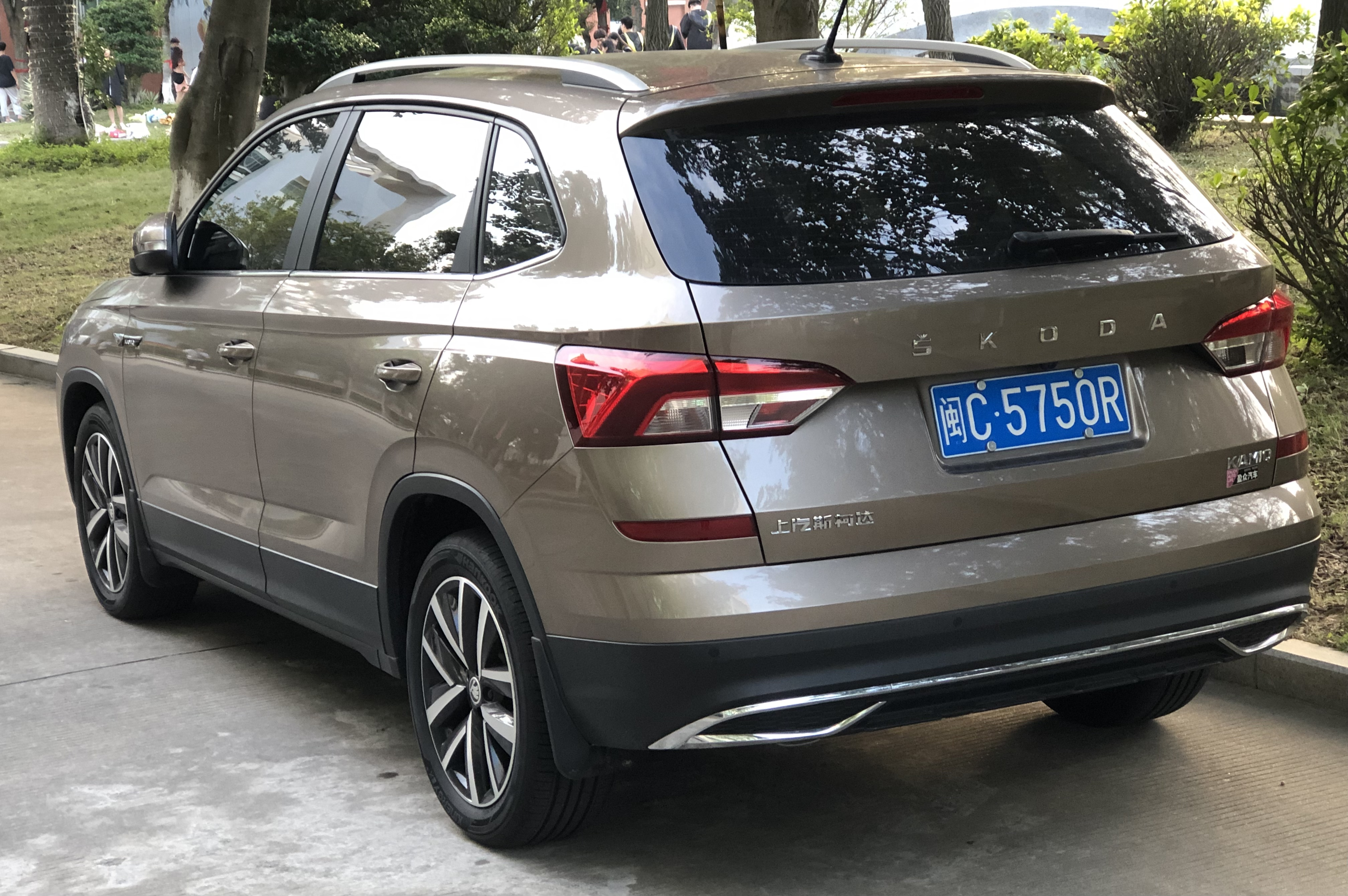
Škoda Kamiq (rear)

Škoda Kamiq GT

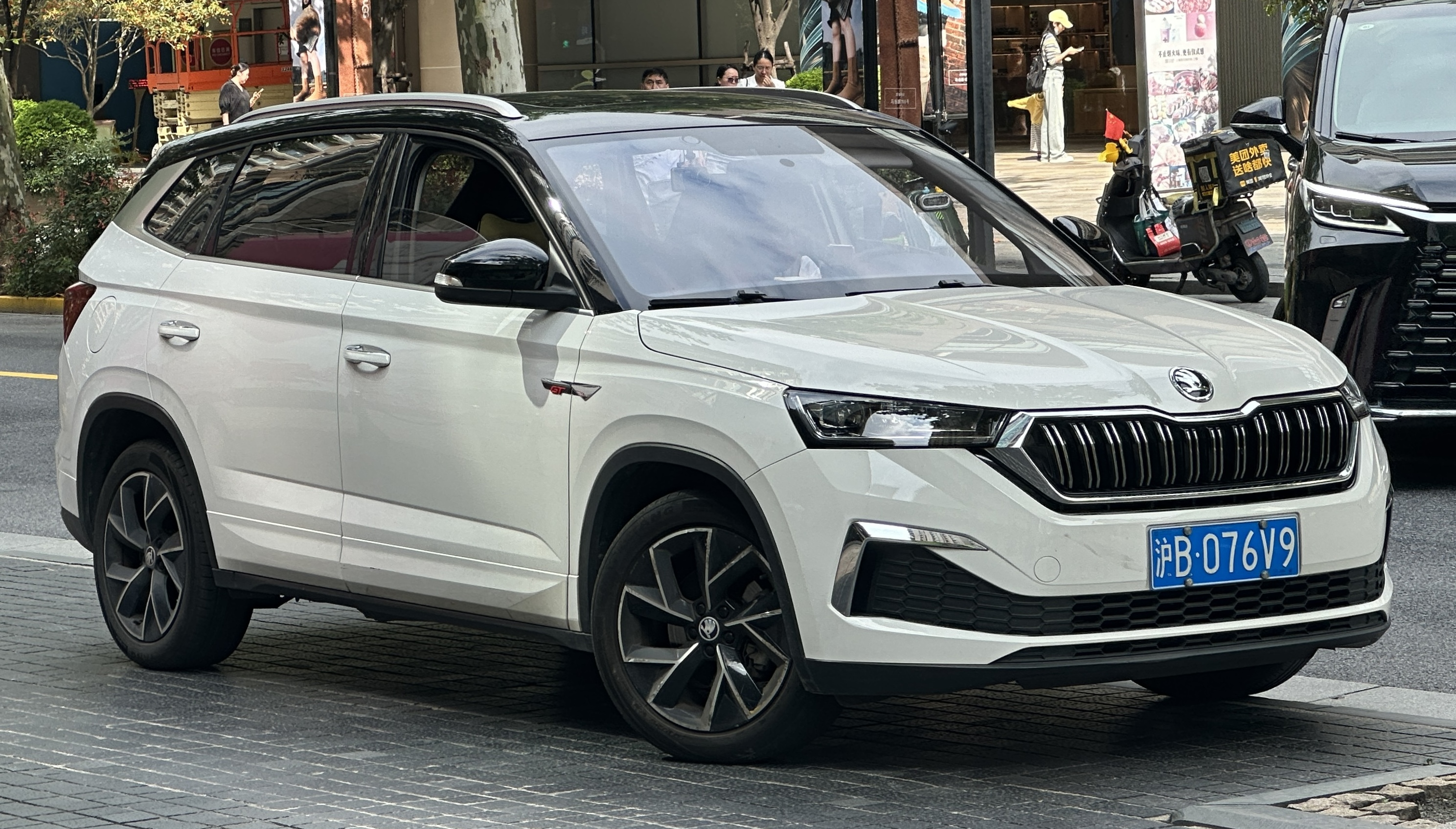
Škoda Kamiq GT (front)

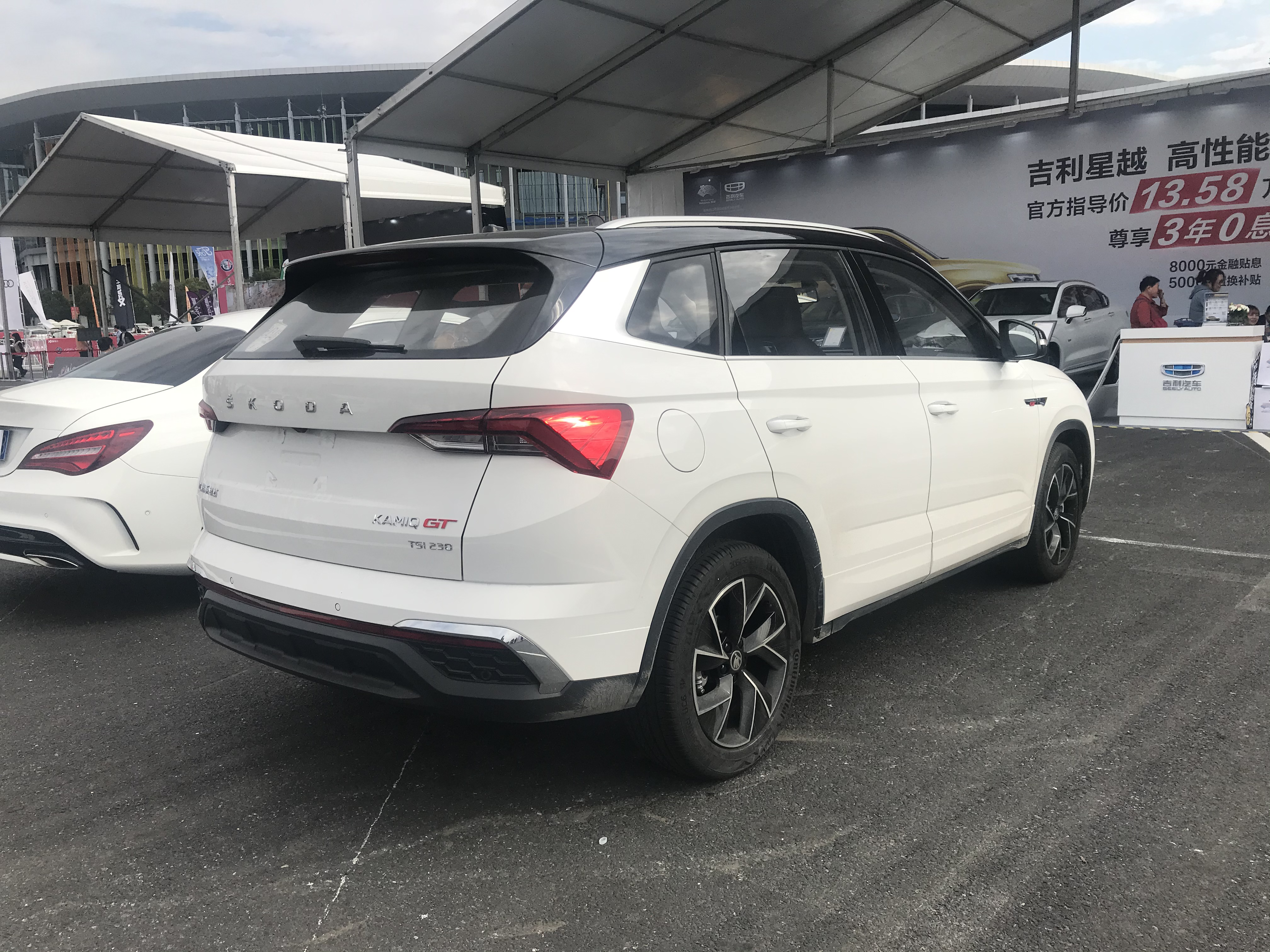
Škoda Kamiq GT (rear)

== Sales ==
Year	China
2018	37,143
2019	52,660
2020	40,039
2021	
2022	
2023	6,848
2024	4,798
2025	2,969
