= Skała (disambiguation) =

Skała is the Polish word for rock.

== Places ==
- Skała, a town in Lesser Poland Voivodeship (south Poland)
- Skała, Jawor County in Lower Silesian Voivodeship (south-west Poland)
- Skała, Lwówek County in Lower Silesian Voivodeship (south-west Poland)
- Skała, Strzelin County in Lower Silesian Voivodeship (south-west Poland)
- Skała, Wrocław County in Lower Silesian Voivodeship (south-west Poland)
- Skała, Świętokrzyskie Voivodeship (south-central Poland)

== Other uses ==
- Skała, a 2009 album by Polish singer Kayah
