= Hugo Skala =

Austrian entomologist (1875–1952)

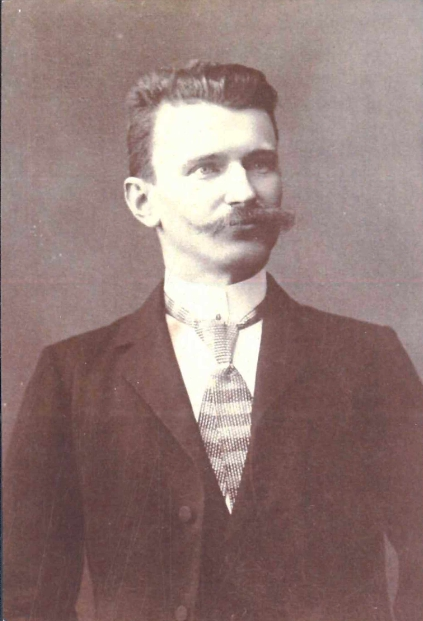
Skala during his time in Fulnek

Hugo Skala (25 January 1875 – 29 June 1952) was an Austrian lepidopterist and tax officer. After retiring from his work in 1923 he became involved in establishing the entomological collections of the Upper Austrian State Museum in Linz.

== Biography ==
Skala was born the sixth child in the German family of clerk Johann Skala in Brno and after going to the local gymnasium he went to the agricultural college at Mödling near Vienna. In 1897, he became an income-tax officer first at Přerov and then at various places including Štíty, Nikolsdorf and Fulnek. After World War I he moved to Upper Austria. He retired in 1923 and moved to Altenfelden. He had developed an interest in the lepidoptera as a young boy and he continued to collect through his career. He sold off his first collection before moving to Austria. He put together a second collection that he bequeathed to the Upper Austrian State Museum in Linz. He took a special interest in the leaf-mining lepidoptera and collected nearly 7400 herbarium specimens of the mined leaves. His other interests including drawing and painting, poetry, and in alpine climbing. He published his major two-part work on the lepidoptera of Moravia ("Die Lepidopterenfauna Mährens") in 1912 and 1913.
