= Škoda Karoq =

Compact crossover SUV

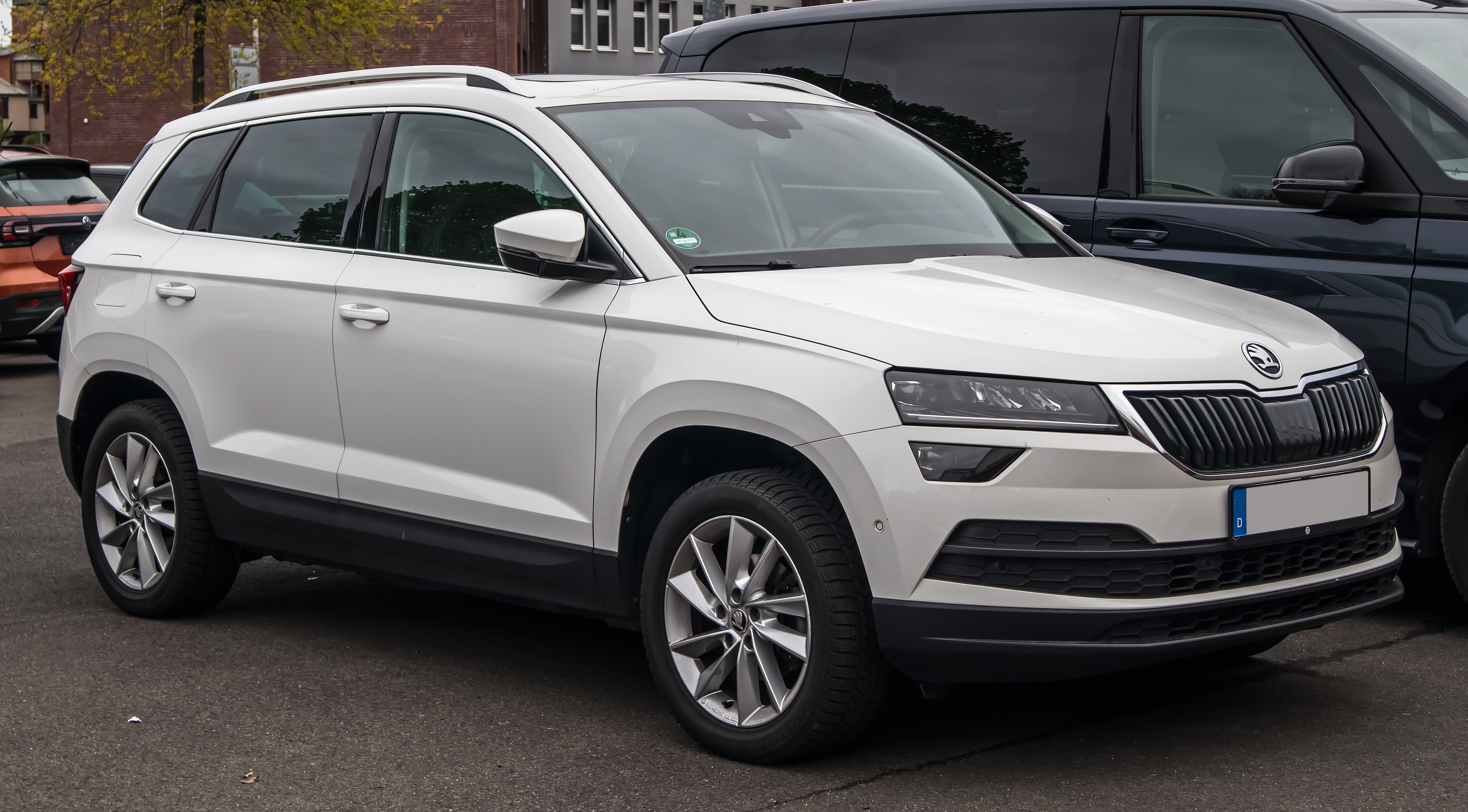

Overview
- Manufacturer: Škoda Auto
- Model code: NU7
- Production: July 2017 – present (Global); 2018–2026 (China)
- Assembly: Czech Republic: Kvasiny; Mladá Boleslav; Germany: Osnabrück (2018–2019); Slovakia: Bratislava (Volkswagen Bratislava Plant, 2020–2023); Russia: Nizhny Novgorod (GAZ); Ukraine: Solomonovo (Eurocar); China: Ningbo (SAIC-VW)
- Designer: Dalibor Pantůček

Body and chassis
- Class: Compact SUV (C-segment)
- Body style: 5-door crossover SUV
- Layout: Front-engine, front-wheel-drive; Front-engine, all-wheel-drive
- Platform: Volkswagen Group MQB A1
- Related: Volkswagen Taos (Russia); SEAT Ateca; Jetta VS5; Volkswagen T-Roc

Powertrain
- Engine: Petrol: 1.0 L TSI I3; 1.2 L TSI I4; 1.4 L TSI I4; 1.5 L TSI I4; 1.6 L MPI I4; 2.0 L TSI I4; Diesel: 1.6 L TDI I4; 2.0 L TDI I4
- Transmission: 5-speed manual; 6-speed manual; 6-speed automatic Aisin; 7-speed DSG; 8-speed automatic Aisin

Dimensions
- Wheelbase: 2,638 mm (103.9 in); 2,688 mm (105.8 in) (China)
- Length: 4,382 mm (172.5 in); 4,432 mm (174.5 in) (China)
- Width: 1,841 mm (72.5 in)
- Height: 1,603–1,614 mm (63.1–63.5 in)

Chronology
- Predecessor: Škoda Yeti

The Škoda Karoq is a compact SUV (C-segment) designed and built by the Czech car manufacturer Škoda Auto. Introduced in 2017, the vehicle is based on the Volkswagen Group MQB A1 platform, and since replaced the Škoda Yeti. As of 2019, it slots between the smaller Kamiq and the larger Kodiaq in Škoda SUV lineup.

The name Karoq is derived from the Aleutian language, spoken by the native inhabitants of the Alaskan island of Kodiak. It is a combination of the Aleutian words "kaa'raq" and "ruq", a car and an arrow, which are the elements of the Škoda logo. It is the second Škoda model to have a name inspired by the Aleuts, after the Kodiaq.

== Overview ==
The car was officially introduced at a special event on 18 May 2017 in Stockholm, Sweden. The car began to be produced at the turn of June and July 2017 in Kvasiny. The sales started in the autumn of 2017. It is a sister model to the SEAT Ateca, sharing its chassis, roof stamping and side doors, although Volkswagen Group adopted extra measures to maximally differentiate their design by applying each brand's design language.

Compared to its predecessor, the Škoda Yeti, the Karoq is significantly larger. It is 160 mm longer, 35 mm wider and 40 mm lower than the Yeti, and the wheelbase is 60 mm longer. It is not being marketed as the second generation Yeti to have a naming consistency with the Kamiq and Kodiaq. The new Karoq name is also adopted to boost the car's global appeal, since in China, one of the large market for the Karoq, the yeti association is seen as a negative and "polarized", as referred by Škoda board member for sales and marketing Werner Eichhorn.

The Karoq is available in two and four-wheel-drive configurations. Higher trim levels will come with a Driving Mode Select system with five modes, while an Off-Road mode featuring traction control and electronic differential lock is an option on four-wheel-drive models. The Karoq's suspension features a MacPherson-designed front axle with triangular wishbones, and a four-link rear axle. A Dynamic Chassis Control system on the 1.5-litre TSI and 2.0-litre TDI engines will offer three chassis modes which are Comfort, Standard and Sport with electrically operated valves adjusting based on road conditions.

It is Škoda’s best-selling model in 2019, with global deliveries already exceeding 137,700 units in the first 11 months of the year. In 2018, the automaker delivered 115,700 units to customers worldwide, with the total number of units built since the model’s launch in October 2017 reaching the 250,000 mark in mid-September 2019.

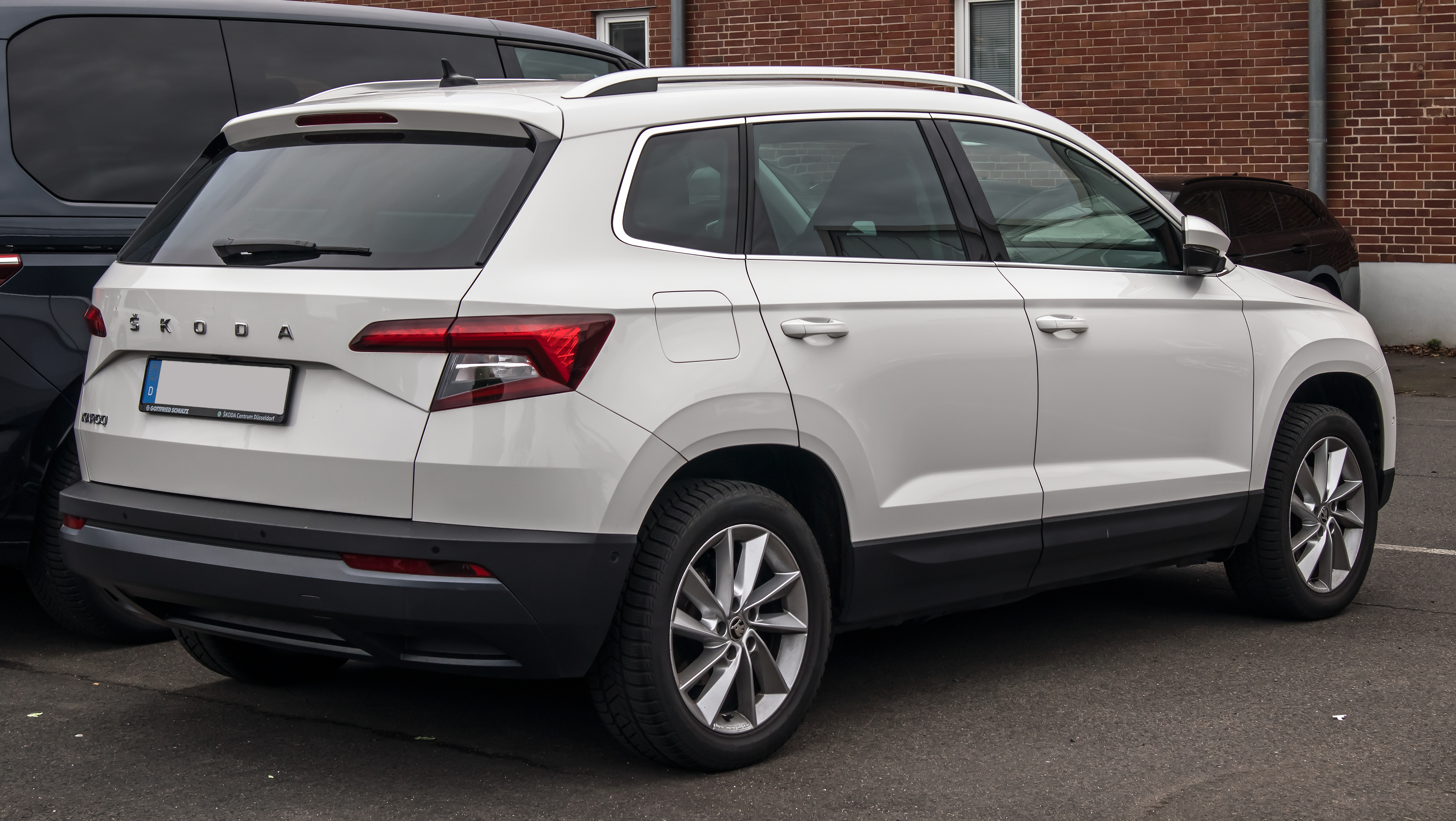
Škoda Karoq (rear)

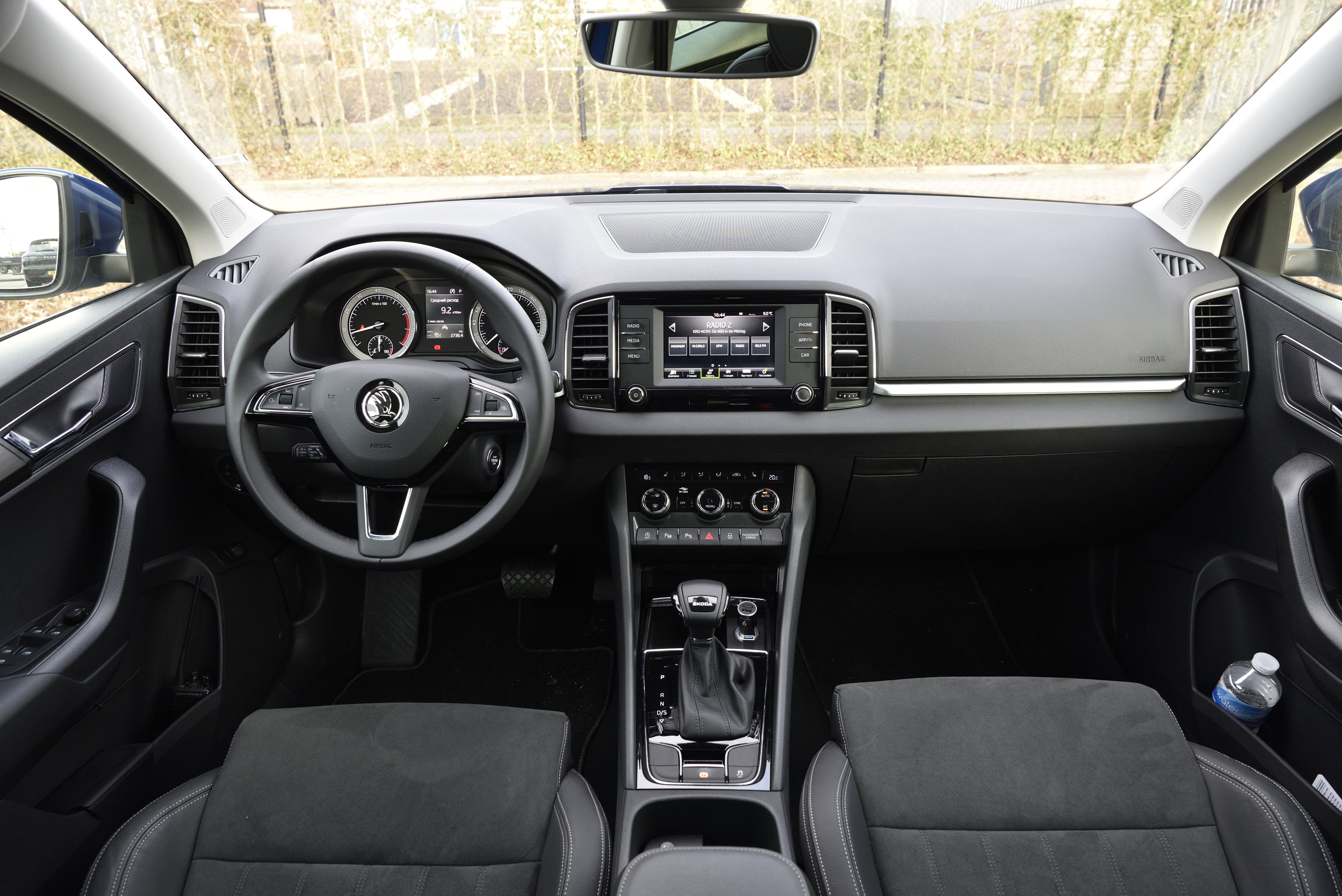
Interior

=== China ===
The Karoq for the Chinese market is produced by SAIC-Volkswagen, which is the sole manufacturer of Škoda vehicles in China. The vehicle made its domestic debut at the 2017 Guangzhou Auto Show with the Chinese name 柯珞克; (Kēluòkè). Compared to the European model, the car is longer by 50 mm (2.0 in) and the wheelbase is increased by 50 mm (2.0 in). It went on sale in January 2018.

The vehicle is used as a basis for a Volkswagen-badged sister model called the Volkswagen Tharu.

=== Russia ===
The Karoq entered production on 12 December 2019 at Volkswagen Group’s Nizhny Novgorod plant in Russia through CKD kits. It went on sale in Russia from February 2020. The standard engine choice is a 110 PS (108 hp; 81 kW) 1.6-litre MPI naturally aspirated four-cylinder petrol engine, while a 150 PS (148 hp; 110 kW) 1.4-litre TSI petrol is available for higher trims. The base engine comes with a 5-speed manual or 6-speed automatic transmission and front-wheel drive, while the TSI is mated to either an 8-speed automatic and FWD or a 6-speed DSG transmission with AWD.

== Powertrain ==
The Škoda Karoq is available with several engines for different markets ranging from 1.0 to 2.0-litres, and a choice of front or all-wheel drive.

Petrol engines
Model	Years	Displacement	Power	Torque	Top speed	Fuel economy (US MPG)	Transmission	Markets
1.0 TSI	2020-2021	999 cc I3	110 PS (81 kW; 108 hp)	200 N⋅m (148 lb⋅ft)	187 km/h (116 mph)	6.2 L/100 km (38 MPG)	6-speed manual	Europe
1.0 TSI	2017-2020	999 cc I3	115 PS (85 kW; 113 hp)	200 N⋅m (148 lb⋅ft)	187 km/h (116 mph)	5.3 L/100 km (44 MPG)	6-speed manual	Europe
1.0 TSI	2017-2020	999 cc I3	115 PS (85 kW; 113 hp)	200 N⋅m (148 lb⋅ft)	186 km/h (116 mph)	5.2 L/100 km (45 MPG)	7-speed DSG	Europe
1.2 TSI	2017-	1,197 cc I4	115 PS (85 kW; 113 hp)	185 N⋅m (136 lb⋅ft)			6-speed manual or 7-speed automatic	China
1.4 TSI	2017-	1,395 cc I4	150 PS (110 kW; 148 hp)	250 N⋅m (184 lb⋅ft)			6-speed manual or 7-speed DSG	China
1.4 TSI	2017-	1,395 cc I4	150 PS (110 kW; 148 hp)	250 N⋅m (184 lb⋅ft)	198 km/h (123 mph)	7.1 L/100 km (33 MPG)	8-speed automatic	Russia, Australia
1.4 TSI 4x4	2017-	1,395 cc I4	150 PS (110 kW; 148 hp)	250 N⋅m (184 lb⋅ft)	192 km/h (119 mph)	8.1 L/100 km (29 MPG)	7-speed DSG	Russia
1.5 TSI	2017-2021	1,498 cc I4	150 PS (110 kW; 148 hp)	250 N⋅m (184 lb⋅ft)	207 km/h (129 mph)	6.4 L/100 km (37 MPG)	6-speed manual	Europe
1.5 TSI	2017-2021	1,498 cc I4	150 PS (110 kW; 148 hp)	250 N⋅m (184 lb⋅ft)	206 km/h (128 mph)	6.4 L/100 km (37 MPG)	7-speed DSG	Europe
1.6 MPI	2017-	1,598 cc I4	110 PS (81 kW; 108 hp)	152 N⋅m (112 lb⋅ft)	185 km/h (115 mph)	7.1 L/100 km (33 MPG)	5-speed manual	Russia
1.6 MPI	2017-	1,598 cc I4	110 PS (81 kW; 108 hp)	152 N⋅m (112 lb⋅ft)	180 km/h (112 mph)	7.2 L/100 km (33 MPG)	6-speed automatic	Russia
2.0 TSI 4x4	2017-2019, 2021	1,984 cc I4	190 PS (140 kW; 187 hp)	320 N⋅m (236 lb⋅ft)	218 km/h (135 mph)	6.8 L/100 km (35 MPG)	7-speed DSG	Europe, Australia
2.0 TSI 4x4	2019-2020	1,984 cc I4	190 PS (140 kW; 187 hp)	400 N⋅m (295 lb⋅ft)	211 km/h (131 mph)	5.3 L/100 km (44 MPG)	7-speed DSG	Europe, Australia
Diesel engines
1.6 TDI	2017-2020	1,598 cc I4	115 PS (85 kW; 113 hp)	250 N⋅m (184 lb⋅ft)	188 km/h (117 mph)	4.6 L/100 km (51 MPG)	6-speed manual	Europe
1.6 TDI	2017-2020	1,598 cc I4	115 PS (85 kW; 113 hp)	250 N⋅m (184 lb⋅ft)	188 km/h (117 mph)	4.4 L/100 km (53 MPG)	7-speed DSG	Europe
2.0 TDI	2020-2021	1,968 cc I4	115 PS (85 kW; 113 hp)	250 N⋅m (184 lb⋅ft) 300 N⋅m (221 lb⋅ft)	190 km/h (118 mph)	5 L/100 km (47 MPG)	6-speed manual	Europe
2.0 TDI	2020-2021	1,968 cc I4	115 PS (85 kW; 113 hp)	250 N⋅m (184 lb⋅ft)	189 km/h (117 mph)	5 L/100 km (47 MPG)	7-speed DSG	Europe
2.0 TDI SCR	2017-2021	1,968 cc I4	150 PS (110 kW; 148 hp)	340 N⋅m (251 lb⋅ft)	207 km/h (129 mph)	5.1 L/100 km (47 MPG)	6-speed manual	Europe
2.0 TDI SCR 4x4	2017-2021	1,968 cc I4	150 PS (110 kW; 148 hp)	340 N⋅m (251 lb⋅ft)	196 km/h (122 mph)	5 L/100 km (47 MPG)	6-speed manual	Europe
2.0 TDI SCR 4x4	2017-2021	1,968 cc I4	150 PS (110 kW; 148 hp)	360 N⋅m (266 lb⋅ft)	199 km/h (124 mph)	5.9 L/100 km (40 MPG)	7-speed DSG	Europe
2.0 TDI SCR 4x4	2019-2020	1,968 cc I4	190 PS (140 kW; 187 hp)	400 N⋅m (295 lb⋅ft)	211 km/h (131 mph)	5.3 L/100 km (44 MPG)	7-speed DSG	Europe

== Facelift ==
The facelifted Karoq was unveiled in December 2021. It features a completely restyled front and rear end, and received a few new comfort-related features on the inside. It offers a new 10.25-inch digital gauge cluster, three-zone automatic AC, adaptive suspension DCC (Dynamic Chassis Control) and electric sliding panoramic sunroof for higher trim levels. The new Karoq is first offered in Czech Republic, Slovakia and Switzerland with pre-orders starting December 2021 and delivery to customers in spring of 2022. It is sold in three trim levels: Active (Slovakia and Czech Republic only), Ambition and Style, as well as a sporty Karoq Sportline. Detailed technical specifications were published in February 2022.

Pre-facelift

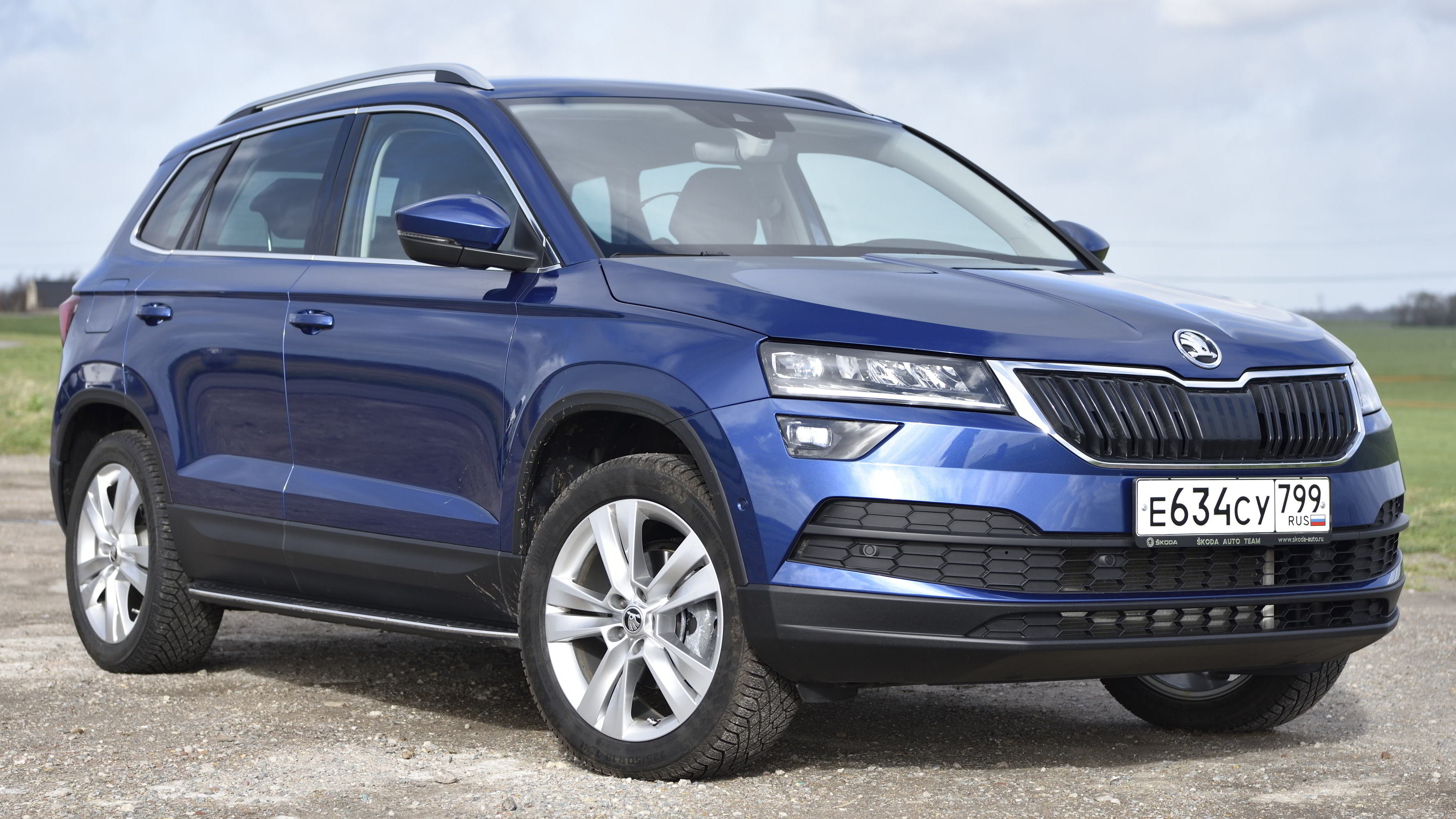
Front (standard)

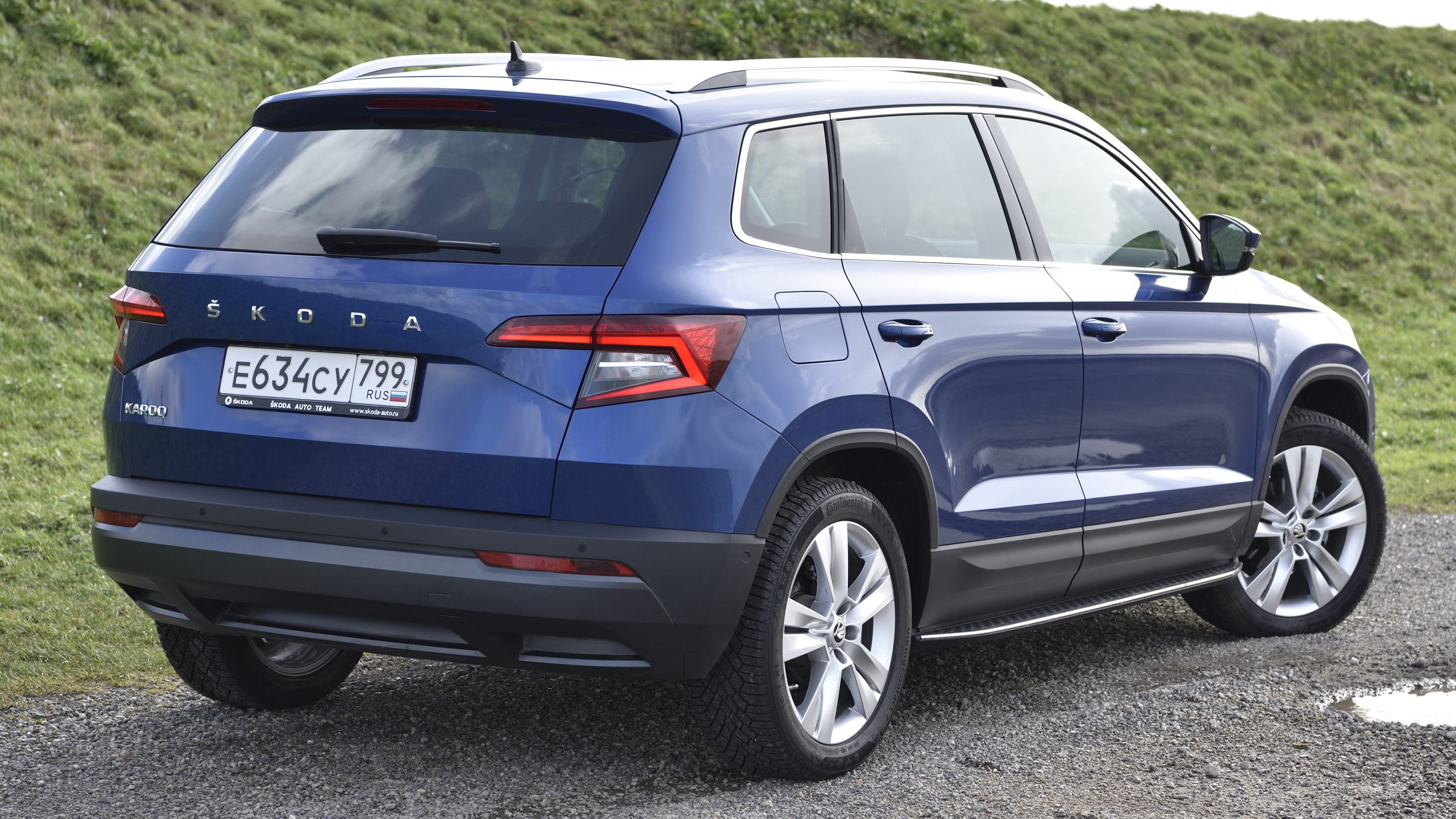
Rear (standard)

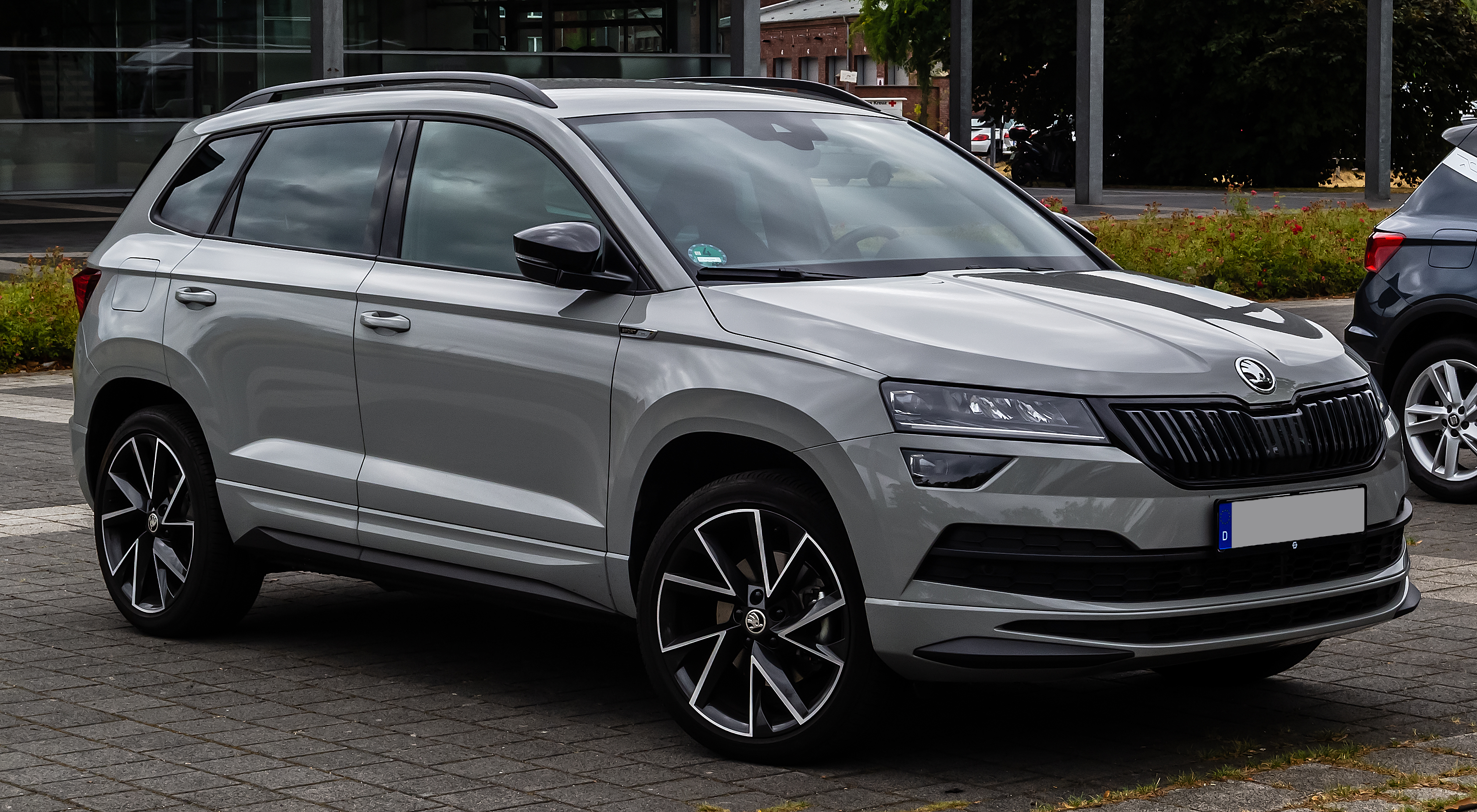
Front (Sportline)

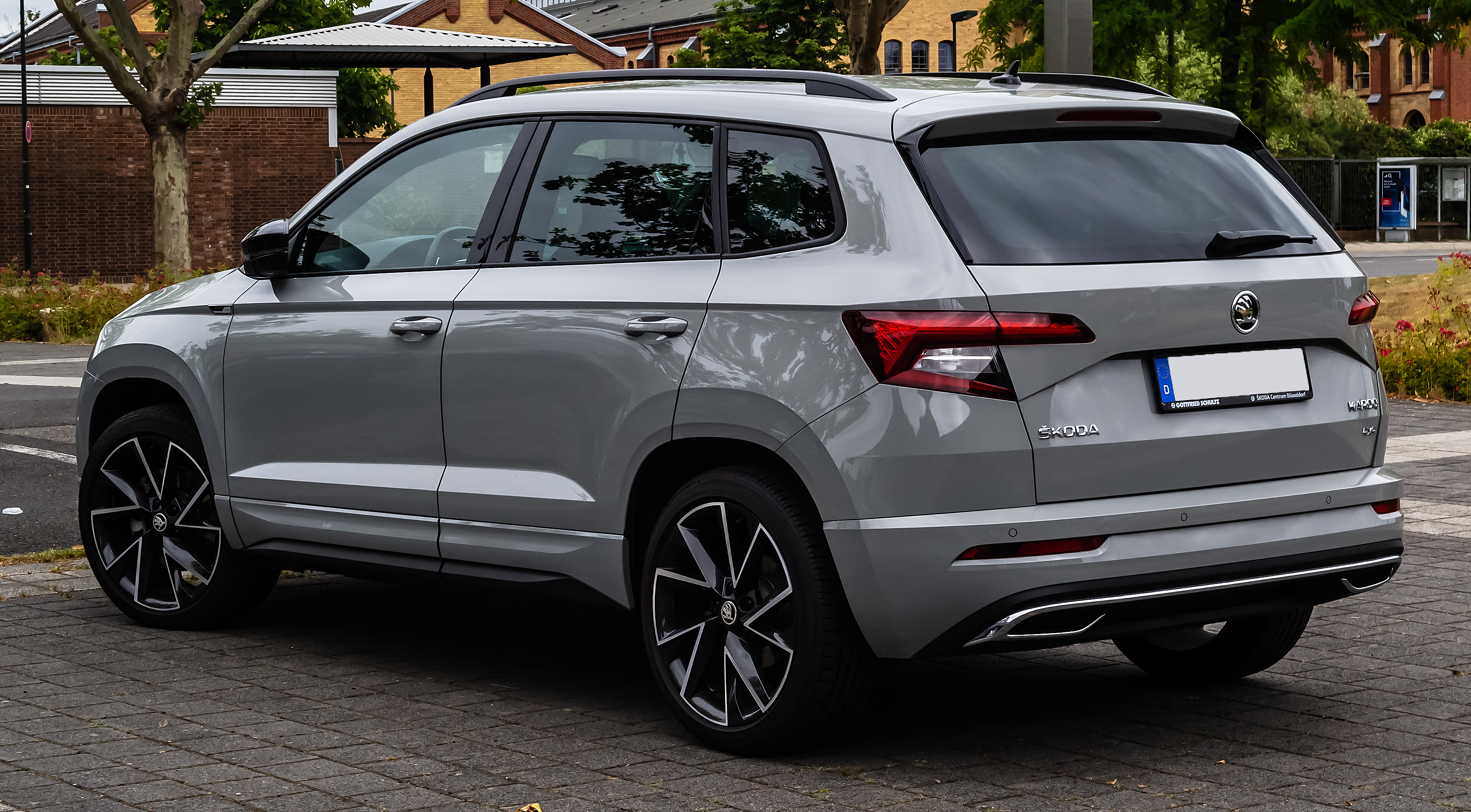
Rear (Sportline)

Facelift

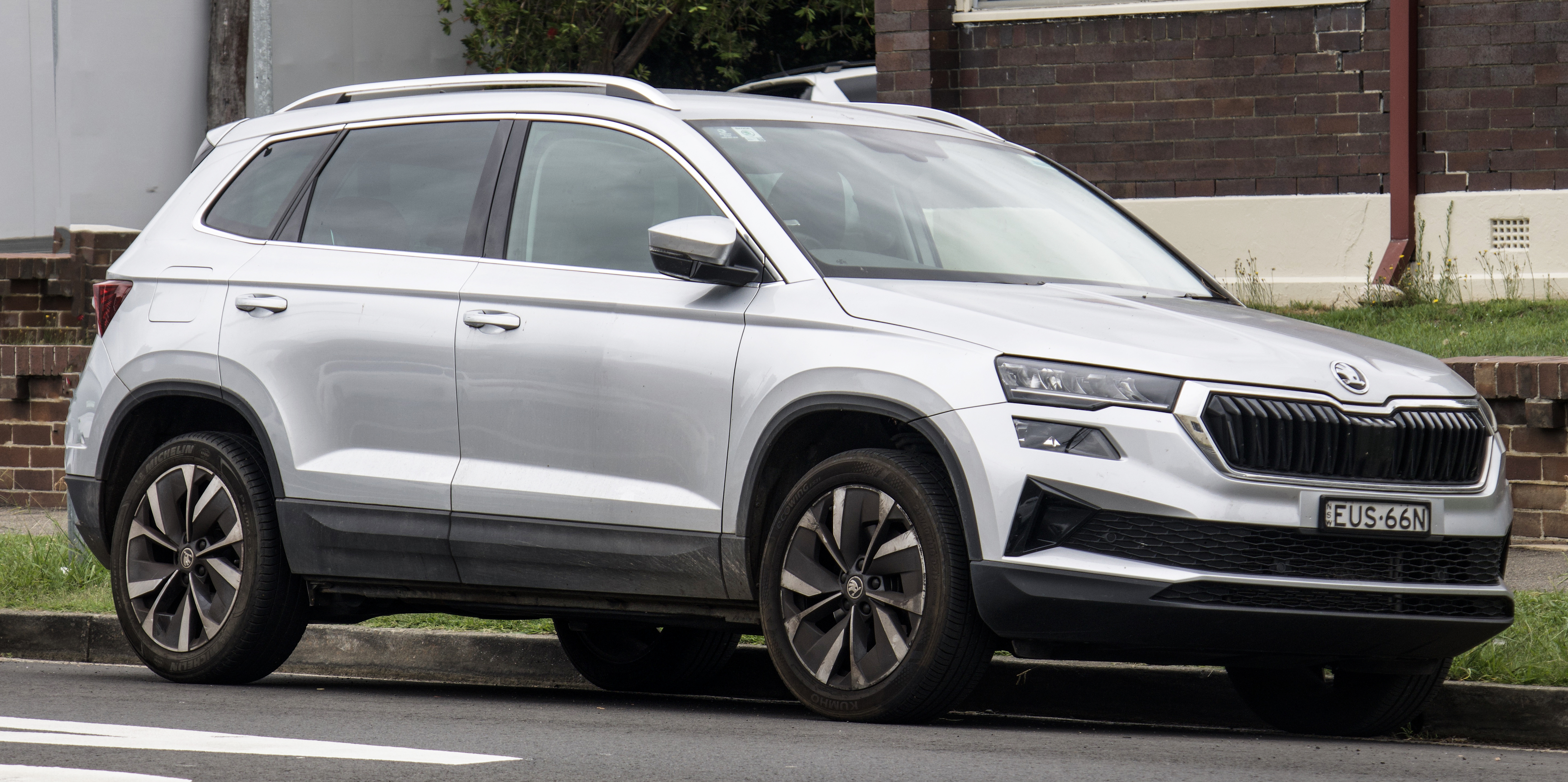
Front (standard)

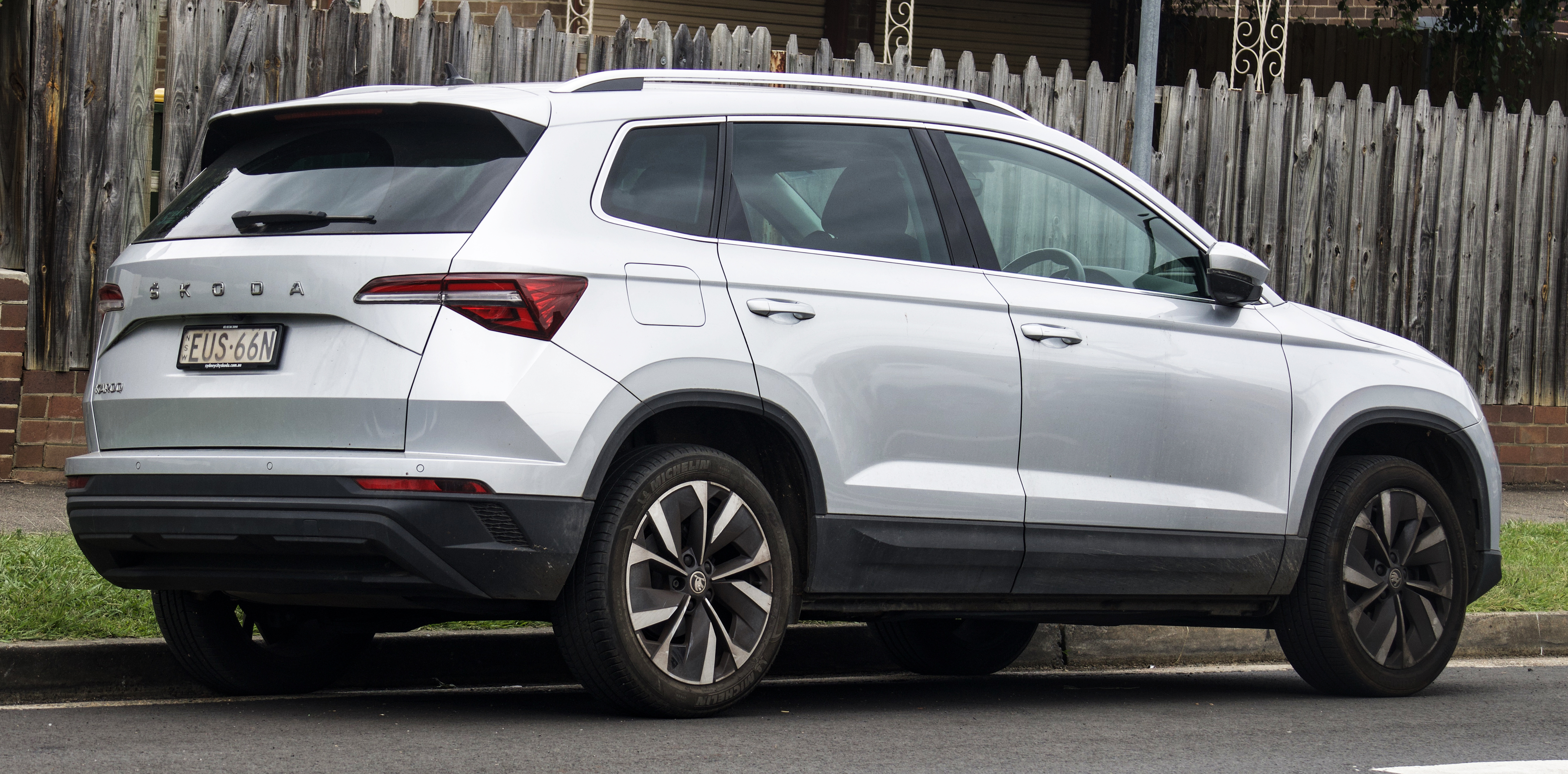
Rear (standard)

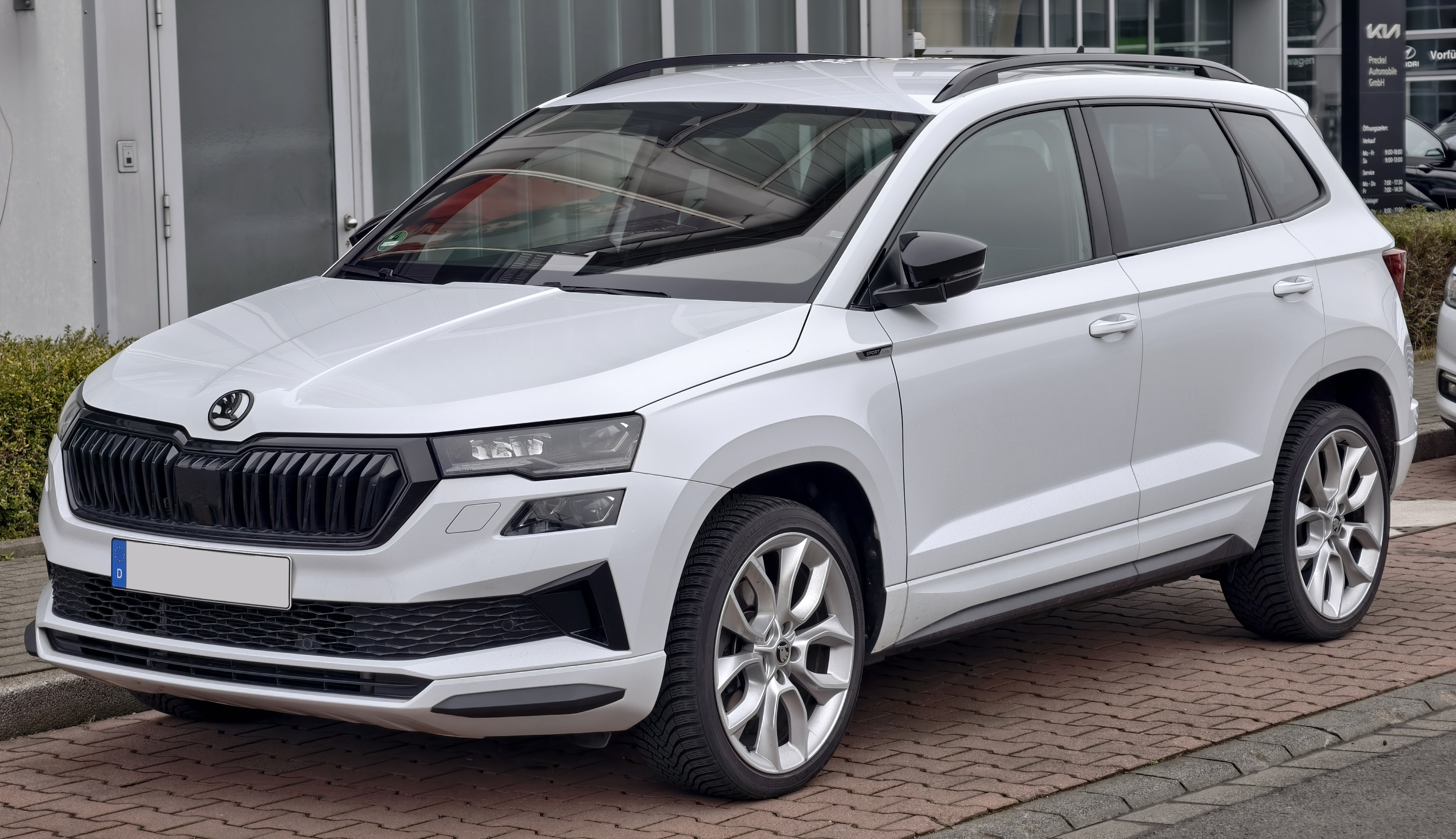
Front (Sportline)

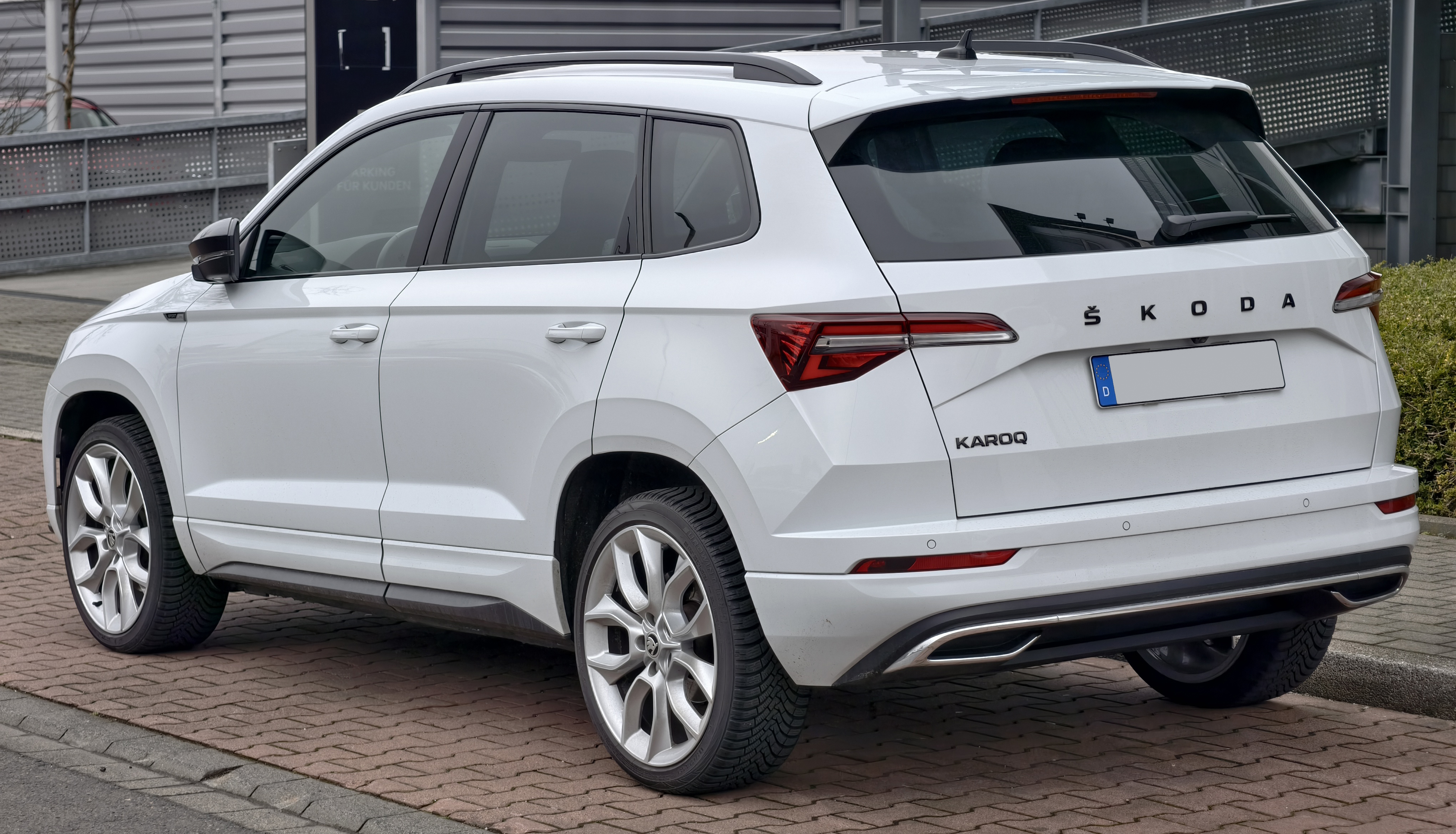
Rear (Sportline)

=== Powertrain ===
Petrol engines
Model	Years	Displacement	Power	Torque	Top speed	Fuel economy (US MPG)	Transmission	Markets
1.0 TSI Evo	2022-	999 cc I3	110 PS (81 kW; 108 hp)	200 N⋅m (148 lb⋅ft)	191 km/h (119 mph)	6.2 L/100 km (38 MPG)	6-speed manual	Europe
1.5 TSI ACT Evo	2022-	1,498 cc I4	150 PS (110 kW; 148 hp)	250 N⋅m (184 lb⋅ft)	211 km/h (131 mph)	6.5 L/100 km (36 MPG)	6-speed manual	Europe
1.5 TSI ACT Evo	2022-	1,498 cc I4	150 PS (110 kW; 148 hp)	250 N⋅m (184 lb⋅ft)	210 km/h (130 mph)	6.5 L/100 km (36 MPG)	7-speed DSG	Europe
2.0 TSI Evo 4x4	2022-	1,984 cc I4	190 PS (140 kW; 187 hp)	320 N⋅m (236 lb⋅ft)	221 km/h (137 mph)	7.8 L/100 km (30 MPG)	7-speed DSG	Europe, Sportline only
Diesel engines
2.0 TDI Evo	2022-	1,968 cc I4	115 PS (85 kW; 113 hp)	300 N⋅m (221 lb⋅ft)	193 km/h (120 mph)	5 L/100 km (47 MPG)	6-speed manual	Europe
2.0 TDI Evo	2022-	1,968 cc I4	115 PS (85 kW; 113 hp)	250 N⋅m (184 lb⋅ft)	192 km/h (119 mph)	5.1 L/100 km (46 MPG)	7-speed DSG	Europe
2.0 TDI SCR Evo	2022-	1,968 cc I4	150 PS (110 kW; 148 hp)	340 N⋅m (251 lb⋅ft)	210 km/h (130 mph)	5.1 L/100 km (46 MPG)	6-speed manual	Europe
2.0 TDI SCR Evo 4x4	2022-	1,968 cc I4	150 PS (110 kW; 148 hp)	360 N⋅m (266 lb⋅ft)	204 km/h (127 mph)	5.9 L/100 km (40 MPG)	7-speed DSG	Europe

== Awards ==
In the German reading poll Autonis 2017, Auto motor und sport readers voted Karoq the most beautiful car in the class of compact SUV. The German car magazines Auto Bild and Bild am Sonntag have awarded Karoq with the Golden Steering Wheel 2017. The Škoda Karoq won the title Car of the Year 2018 in the Czech Republic in January 2018.

== Sales and production figures ==
Strong demand for the Karoq forced Volkswagen Group to assemble the car in two additional plants, in Mladá Boleslav, Czech Republic and in Volkswagen plant in Osnabrück, Germany in 2018-2019. In April 2018, Škoda CEO Bernhard Maier said during Škoda's annual results conference that customers in several markets had to wait for up to 10 months for their car to be delivered. It was also manufactured in Bratislava, Slovakia from October 2020 to December 2023.

Year	Sales		Production
Year	Europe	China	Production
2017	5,981		
2018	78,842	31,071	173,816
2019	105,041	38,026	203,688
2020	82,121	22,536	
2021	73,958	10,281	
2022	69,154	5,741	
2023		2,928	
2024		2,528	
2025		2,347	

== Safety ==
ANCAP test results Skoda Karoq (2017, aligned with Euro NCAP)
Test	Points	%
Overall:	5 /5 stars	
Adult occupant:	35.5	93%
Child occupant:	38.9	79%
Pedestrian:	31	73%
Safety assist:	6.9	58%
