= Škoda Scala =

Small family car produced by Škoda Auto

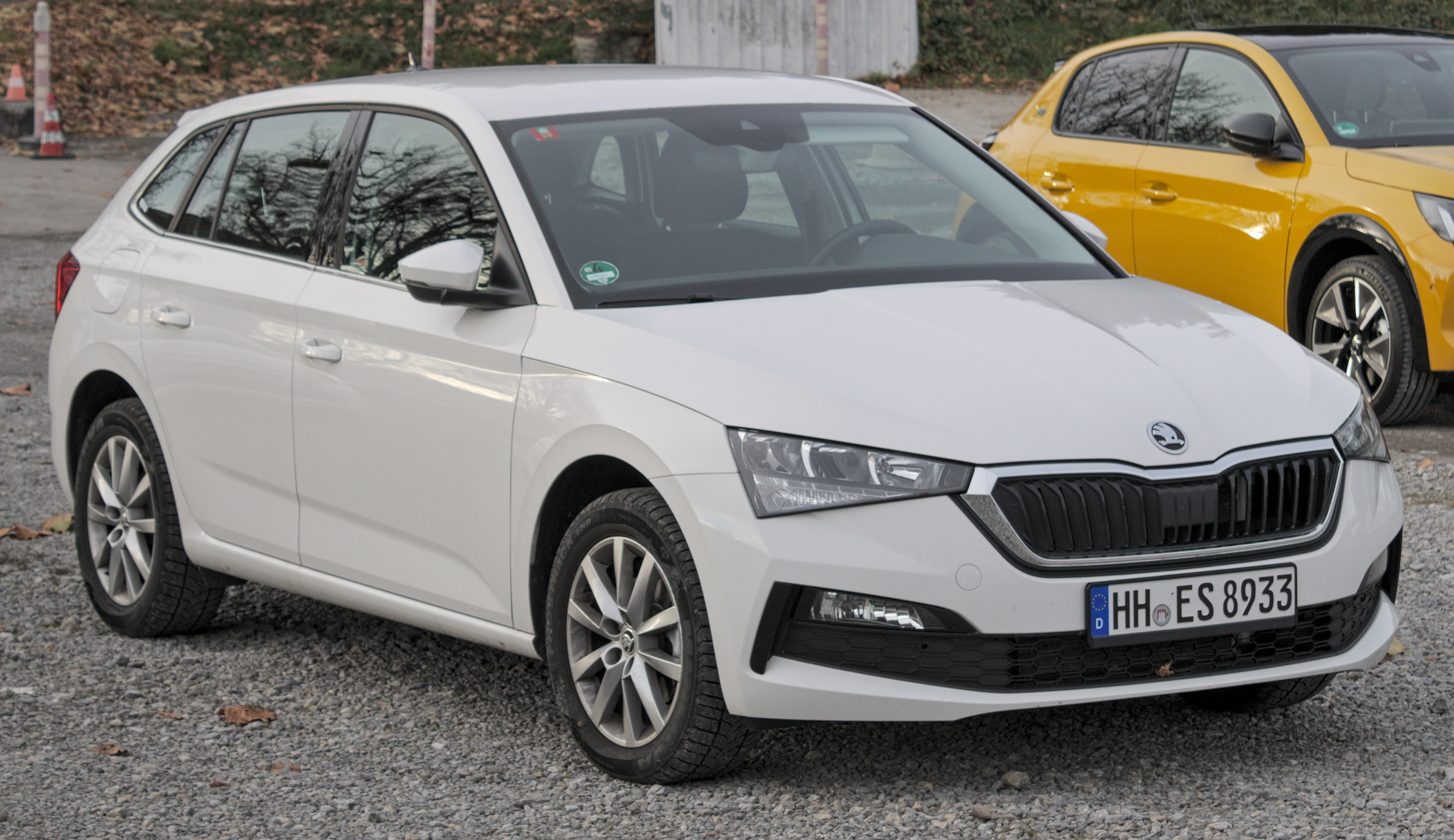

Overview
- Manufacturer: Škoda Auto
- Production: February 2019 – present
- Assembly: Czech Republic: Mladá Boleslav
- Designer: Oliver Stefani, Petr Matušinec, Dalibor Pantůček, Karl Neuhold, Martin Paclt

Body and chassis
- Class: Small family car (C)
- Body style: 5-door hatchback
- Layout: Front-engine, front-wheel-drive
- Platform: Volkswagen Group MQB A0
- Related: Škoda Kamiq; Skoda Fabia Mk4; Volkswagen T-Cross; Volkswagen Polo Mk6; Volkswagen Virtus; SEAT Ibiza Mk5; SEAT Arona

Powertrain
- Engine: Petrol: 1.0 L 95 TSI I3; 1.0 L 115 TSI I3; 1.5 L 150 TSI Evo I4; 1.6 L 110 MPI I4; Diesel: 1.6 L 95 TDI I4; 1.6 L 115 TDI I4; Petrol/CNG: 1.0 L 90 G-Tec I3
- Transmission: 5-speed manual 6-speed manual 6-speed automatic 7-speed DSG

Dimensions
- Wheelbase: 2,649 mm (104.3 in)
- Length: 4,362 mm (171.7 in)
- Width: 1,793 mm (70.6 in)
- Height: 1,471 mm (57.9 in)
- Curb weight: 1,192–1,339 kg (2,628–2,952 lb)

Chronology
- Predecessor: Škoda Rapid Spaceback

The Škoda Scala is a small family car or compact hatchback (C-segment) manufactured by Czech automaker Škoda Auto. The car is intended to fit between the Fabia and the Octavia, and to be a competitor to the cars in the C-segment hatchback segment. The Scala was unveiled in December 2018. An online configurator was accessible in January 2019, and sales officially began in May 2019.

Earlier, it was assumed that the new car would be called Felicia, Garde, Spaceback or Popular, however the name Scala was announced on October 15, 2018. Scala means "stairs" or "ladder" in Latin, according to the car maker it presents a big step forward in the compact car segment. This name has already appeared several times in the past, including the Renault Scala, which was sold between 2012 and 2017, and the Zastava Skala, a small family car between 1971 and 2008. The Scala has a very similar appearance and proportions to the Skoda Rapid Spaceback which was manufactured in the Czech Republic from 2012 to 2019.

== Overview ==
After four years in the development stage, the Scala official premiere was held on 6 December 2018 in Tel Aviv, Israel, as Škoda is the best-selling European brand in the country. The design was previously previewed as the Škoda Vision RS concept at the 2018 Paris Motor Show.

It is based on a stretched version of the MQB A0 platform that underpins the Volkswagen Polo and SEAT Ibiza, which means the car has C-segment dimensions while built above a B-segment platform in order to be competitively priced compared to its rivals. As the result, the Scala has a 2,649 mm (104.3 in) wheelbase, which is 12 mm (0.5 in) longer compared to the Volkswagen Golf. Škoda claims this translates into competitive amount of cabin space, especially for the rear passengers. The usage of the cheaper A0 platform also pushed the use of torsion beam rear suspension, saving costs over the complex multi-link systems.

Four trim levels are available in Europe, which are S, SE, SE L and Monte Carlo.

It is the first Škoda car with a constant internet connection, which works with a built-in SIM with permanent 4G connectivity which allows owners to unlock the car using a smartphone and enables satnav map updates to be updated automatically. It is also equipped with 10.2-inch digital instrument panel, 9.2-inch centre screen, blind spot monitor which senses cars up to 70 meters, lane, front and park assist, crew protect assist, rear traffic alert, adaptive cruise control and 467-litre boot space.

The Scala also features a Sport Chassis Control which offers two different suspension tunings. The chassis is 15 mm lower and in addition to a Normal mode, also has a Sport mode with valve-adjustable shock absorbers that would give the car a firmer ride. Drivers can switch between the two settings via the Driving Mode Select menu.

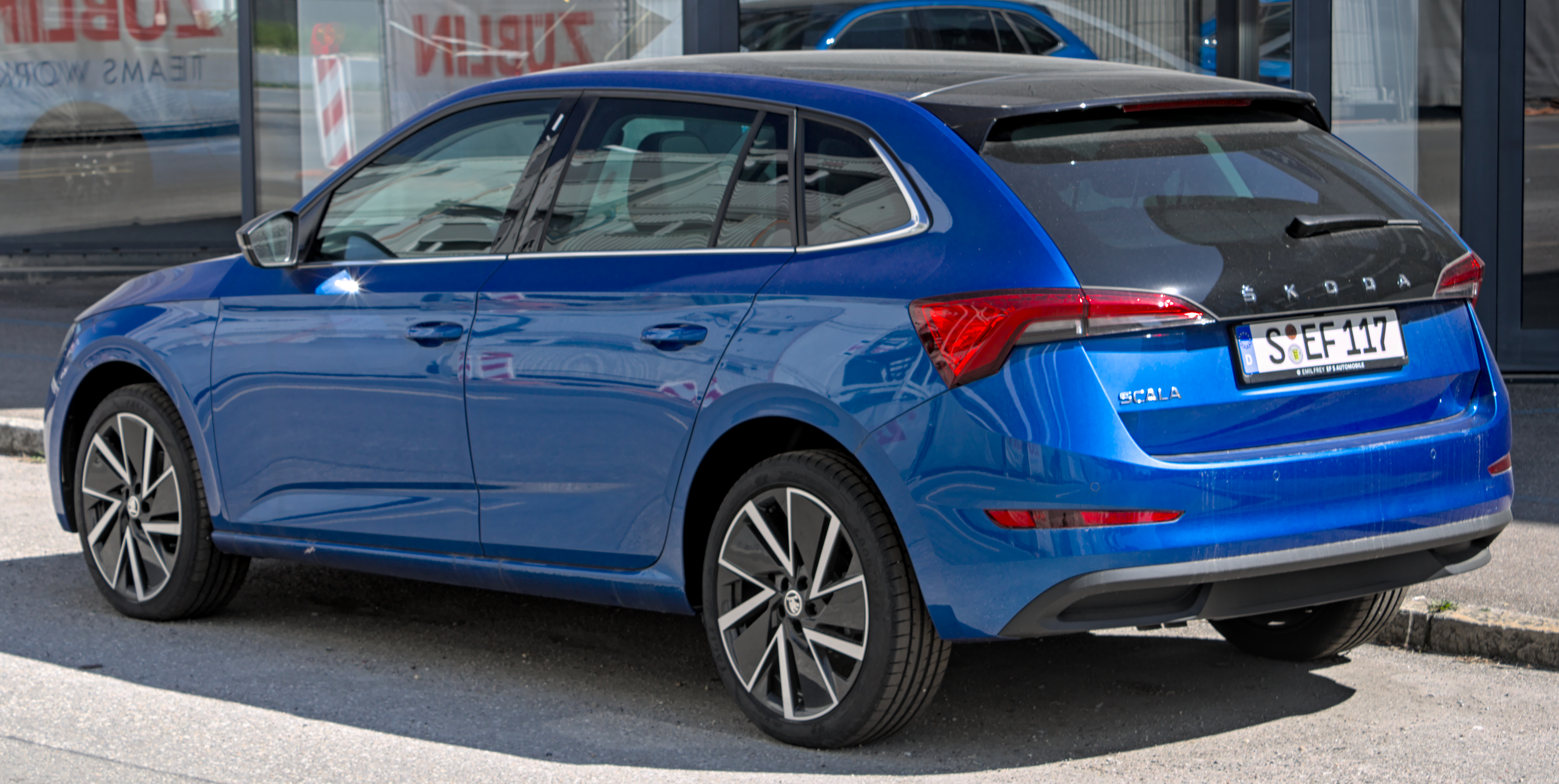
Rear view

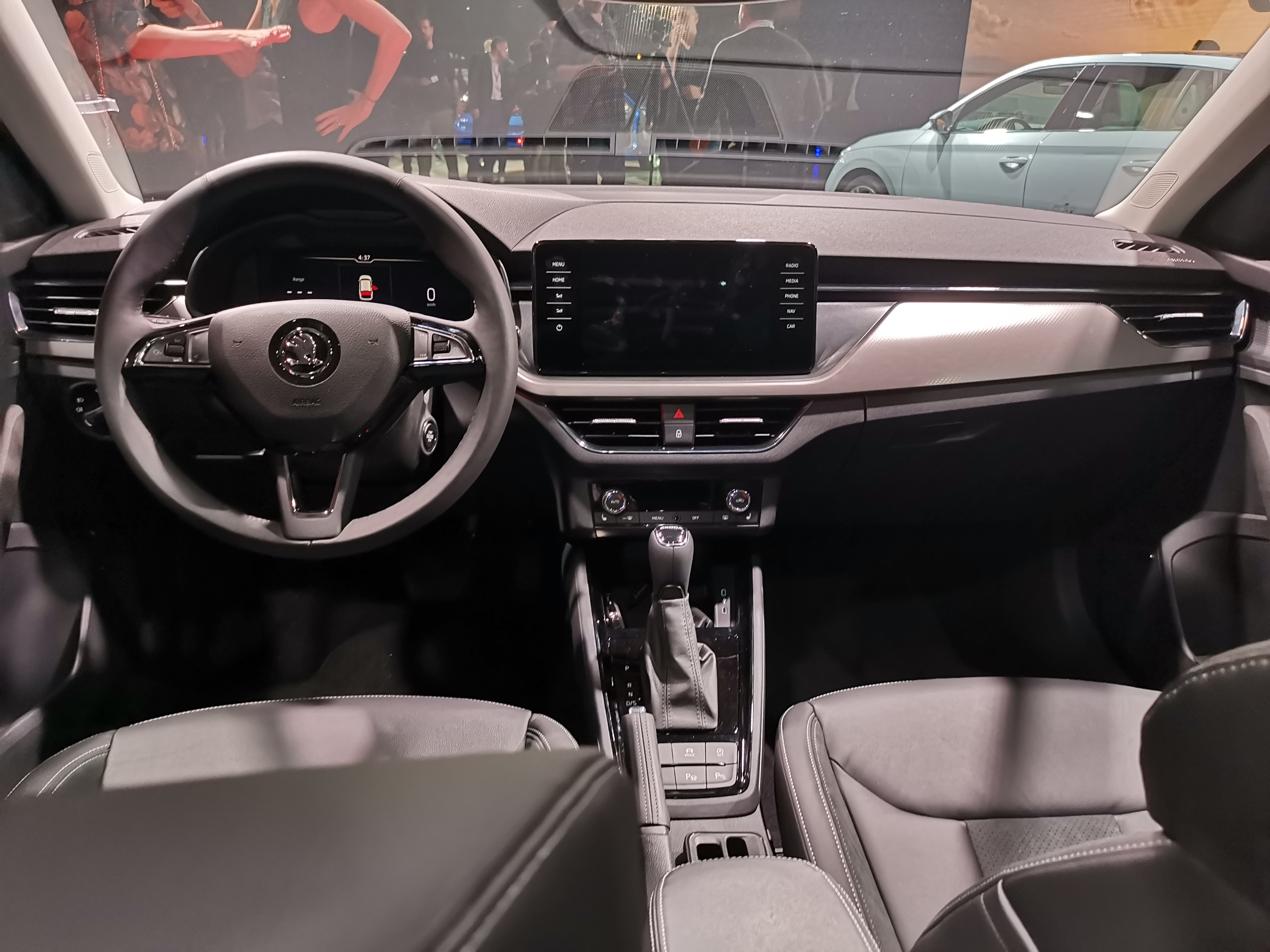
Interior

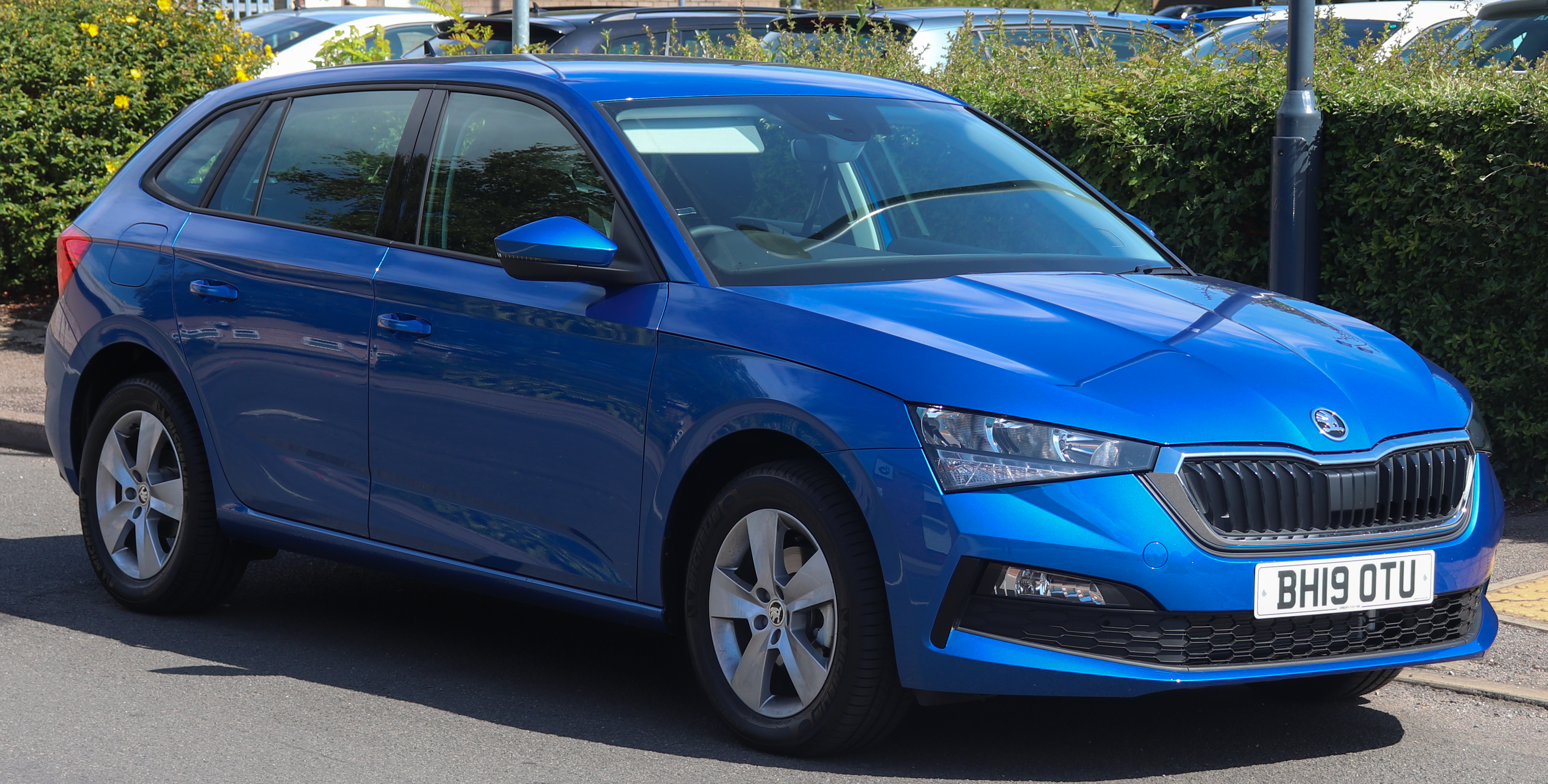
Škoda Scala SE (UK, front view)

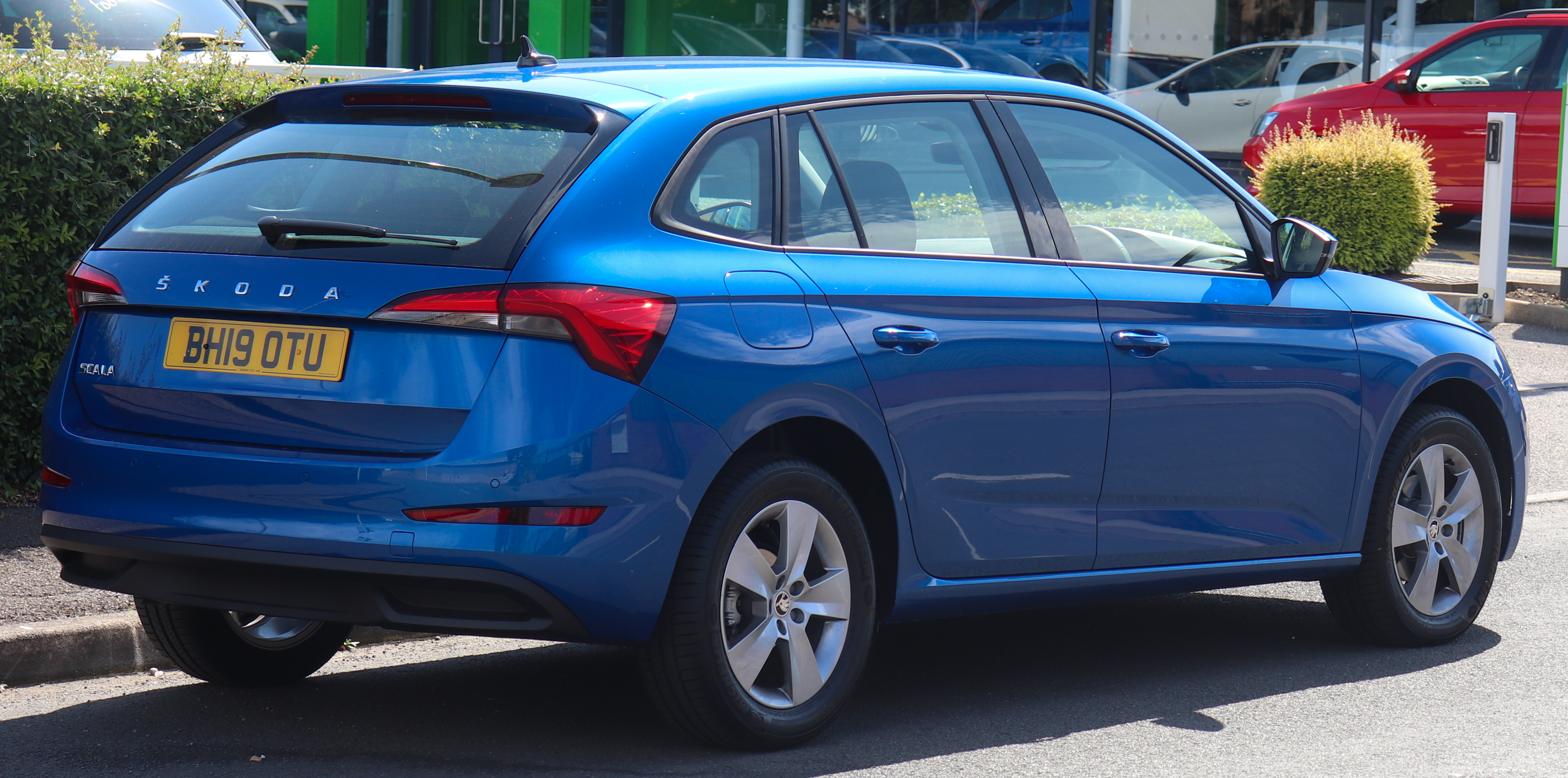
Škoda Scala SE (UK, rear view)

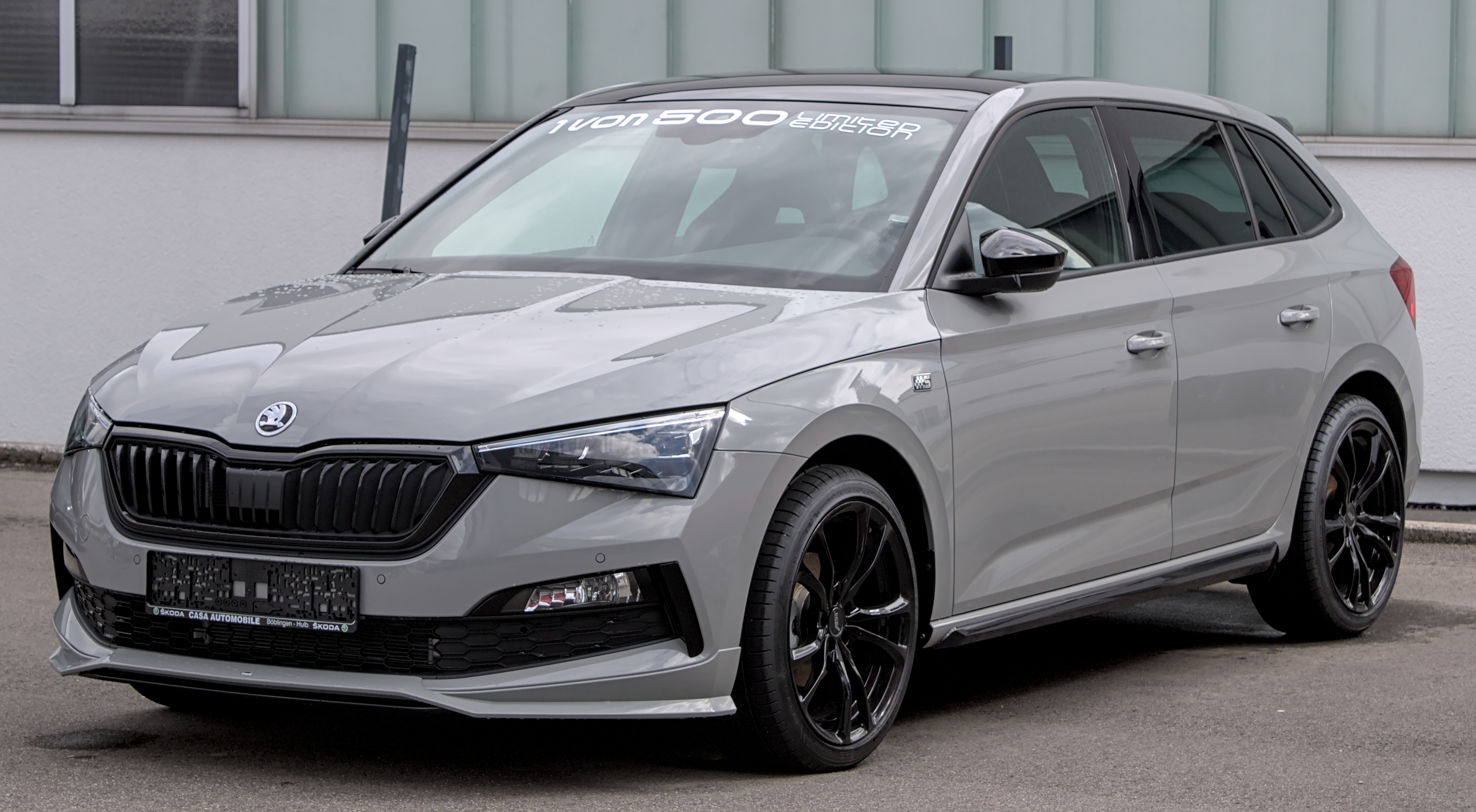
Škoda Scala Edition S

=== Facelift ===
A facelift was unveiled in August 2023 alongside the Kamiq. The changes include redesigned front and rear fascias with the availability of matrix LED headlights, a sportier bodykit inspired from the Vision RS concept, new exterior colours and new alloy wheel designs. Inside, there is a redesigned control panel used to operate the HVAC system, more recycled materials used for the interior improvised standard interior equipment across the line-up, and extra Simply Clever features borrowed from other Škoda models. Škoda has also updated the trim structure and diesel engines are no longer available for the facelift model.

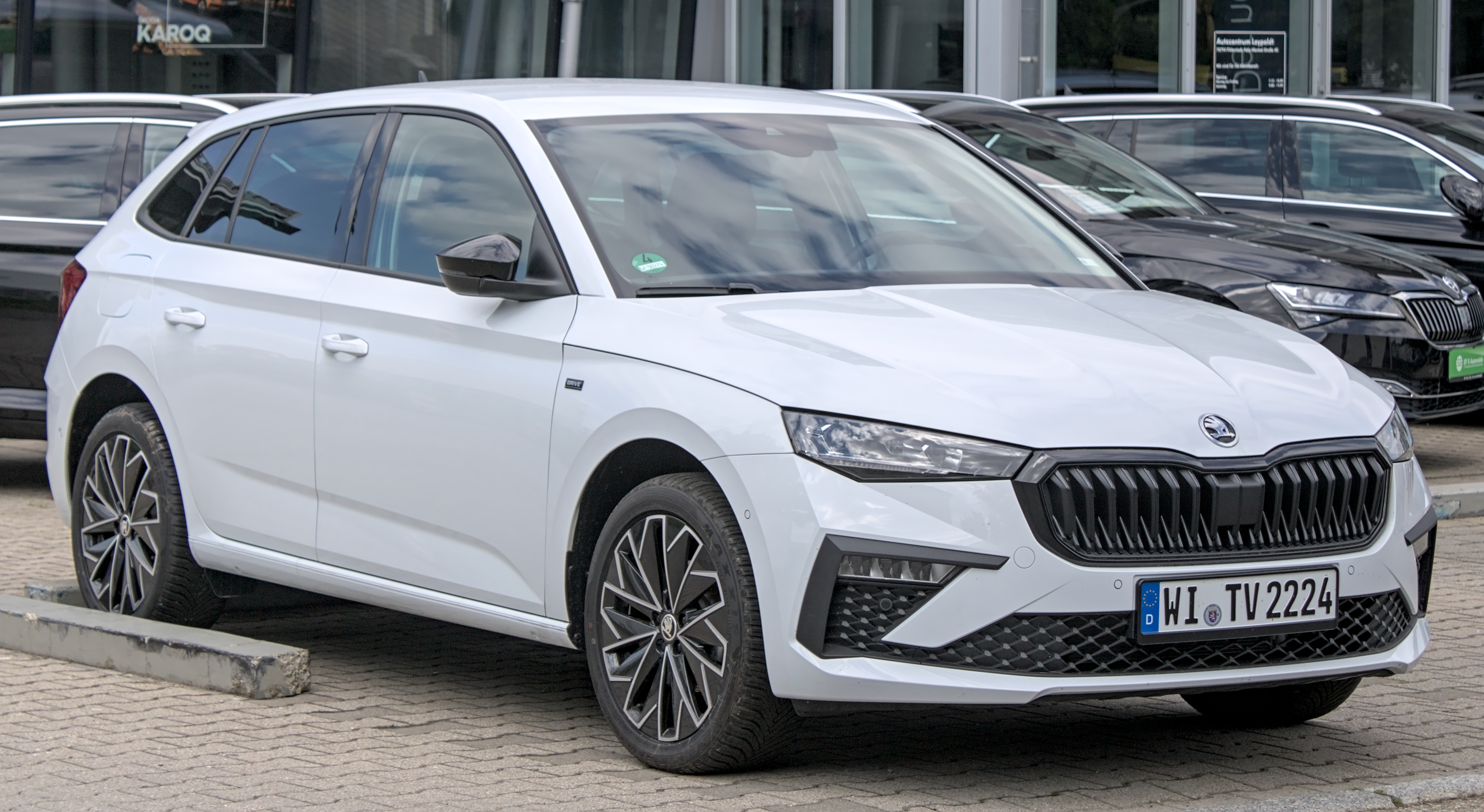
Front view

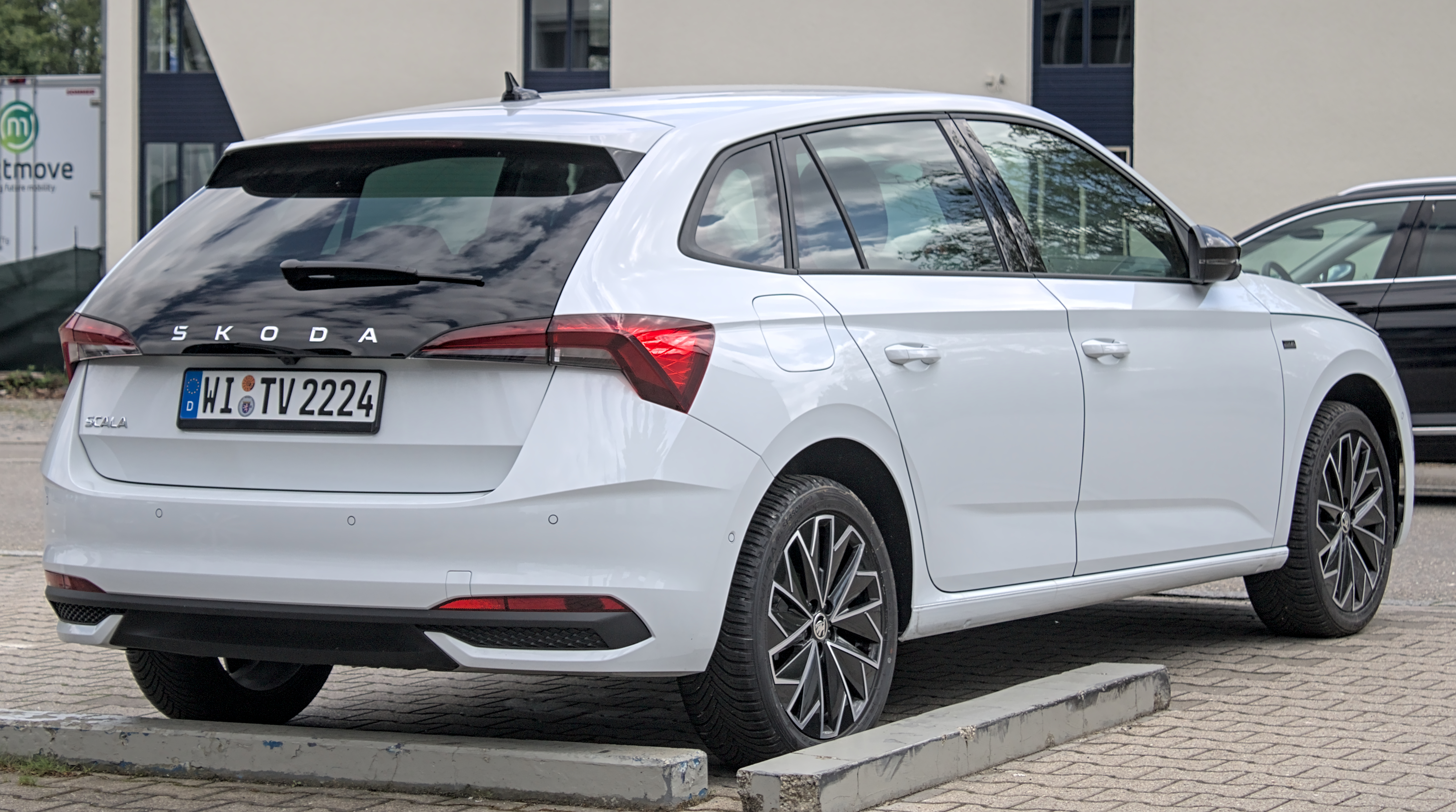
Rear view

=== Safety ===
Euro NCAP test results Škoda Scala 1.0 TSI "Ambition" (LHD) (2019)
Test	Points	%
Overall:	5 /5 stars	
Adult occupant:	37.1	97%
Child occupant:	42.9	87%
Pedestrian:	39.2	81%
Safety assist:	10	76%

ANCAP test results Skoda Scala (2019, aligned with Euro NCAP)
Test	Points	%
Overall:	5 /5 stars	
Adult occupant:	37.1	97%
Child occupant:	43	87%
Pedestrian:	39.1	81%
Safety assist:	9.9	76%

== Powertrain ==
The Scala is available with a range of three turbocharged petrol engines as well as a 1.6-litre naturally aspirated petrol engine. The 1.0-litre TSI unit is available with 95 PS (70 kW; 94 hp) or 115 PS (85 kW; 113 hp), while a more powerful 1.5-litre with 150 PS (110 kW; 148 hp) is also available. In 2019, a CNG G-Tec powertrain is added as an option. The car was originally launched with a diesel engine available, but this was dropped in 2020.

Petrol engines
Model	Displacement	Power	Torque	Transmission
1.0 TSI 95	999 cc I3	95 PS (70 kW; 94 hp)	175 N⋅m (129 lb⋅ft)	5-speed manual
1.0 TSI 115	999 cc I3	115 PS (85 kW; 113 hp)	200 N⋅m (148 lb⋅ft)	6-speed manual or 7-speed DSG
1.5 TSI 150 Evo	1,498 cc I4	150 PS (110 kW; 148 hp)	250 N⋅m (184 lb⋅ft)	6-speed manual or 7-speed DSG
1.6 MPI 110	1,598 cc I4	110 PS (81 kW; 108 hp)	152 N⋅m (112 lb⋅ft)	5-speed manual or 6-speed automatic
Diesel engines
1.6 TDI 115	1,598 cc I4	115 PS (85 kW; 113 hp)	250 N⋅m (184 lb⋅ft)	6-speed manual or 7-speed DSG
Petrol/CNG engine
1.0 G-Tec	999 cc I3	90 PS (66 kW; 89 hp)	145 N⋅m (107 lb⋅ft)	6-speed manual

== Sales ==
Year	Europe (Note: Europe: 2020 EU 27 + UK + Switzerland + Norway + Iceland)	Turkey
2019	36,218	
2020	53,156	
2021	43,924	
2022		3,292
2023		
2024		3,889
2025	53,000	

== Awards ==
The Škoda Scala received the Red Dot Design Award for March 2019. In the leading automobile magazine in Germany, Auto Bild, the Scala defeated its rivals, the Mazda3, the Ford Focus, and the Volkswagen Golf.
