= Francis C. Evans =

American ecologist and professor of zoology

Francis Cope Evans
- Born: December 2, 1914; Philadelphia, Pennsylvania, U.S.
- Died: August 16, 2002 (aged 87); Ann Arbor, Michigan, U.S.
- Education: Haverford College (B.A.); University of Oxford (Ph.D.)
- Known for: Small mammal ecology, vertebrate ecology
- Spouse: Rachel Worthington Brooks (m. 1942)
- Children: 4
- Awards: Guggenheim Fellowship (1961–1962); Fellow, American Association for the Advancement of Science (1963)
- Scientific career
- Fields: Ecology, zoology
- Workplaces: University of Michigan; Haverford College; University of California, Davis
- Doctoral advisor: Charles Sutherland Elton

Francis Cope Evans (2 December 1914, Philadelphia – 16 August 2002, Ann Arbor) was an American ecologist and professor of zoology. He was the president of the Ecological Society of America from 1983 to 1984.

== Biography ==
After secondary education at Germantown Friends School, Evans matriculated at Haverford College and graduated there in 1936 with a bachelor's degree in biology. With a Rhodes Scholarship he was a graduate student in zoology at Oriel College, Oxford, from 1936 to 1939, when he graduated with a Ph.D. supervised by Charles Sutherland Elton. Evans's dissertation, published in 1942 in The Journal of Animal Ecology, dealt with small mammal ecology in Bagley Wood. In 1939 he became a Claypole Memorial Fellow at the University of California, Berkeley, where he worked as a research assistant to the epidemiologist Karl Friedrich Meyer. Evans did fieldwork in California and the Pacific Northwest to study the "relationships of vertebrates, ectoparasites, and disease."

In 1942 Evans moved to the University of California, Davis to become an assistant zoologist supervised by Tracy I. Storer at the Agricultural Experiment Station. In 1943 the University of California closed the Davis campus so that the U.S. Army Signal Corps could use it for the duration of WW II. In that year he became an instructor in biology at Haverford College, where he trained medical personnel for the U.S. war effort. In 1948 he left Haverford to become an assistant biologist in the Laboratory of Vertebrate Biology directed by Lee R. Dice, as well an assistant professor of zoology at the University of Michigan at Ann Arbor. There Evans was promoted to full professor in 1959 and retired as professor emeritus in 1982.

From 1959 to 1982, he served as Associate Director and oversaw the operation of the E. S. George Reserve, a protected tract of fields, ponds, and forests near Ann Arbor. Donated to the university, the Reserve was dedicated to ecological research. It has served as the site of many outstanding research projects by generations of Michigan ecologists.

He was a Guggenheim Fellow for the academic year 1961–1962 and was elected a Fellow of the American Association for the Advancement of Science in 1963.

Evans married Rachel Worthington Brooks (1915–2002) in June 1942. Upon his death he was survived by his widow, four children, and five grandchildren.

== Evans Old Field ==
From 1948 to 1997 Evans studied community ecology in successional changes in a 7.7 ha old field at the Edwin S. George Reserve in Livingston County, Michigan. This study area came to be known as the "Evans Old Field" and is one of the world's most intensively studied old fields. Evans studied the area's bee fauna (134 species) and their visits to 57 different species of flowering plants.

Over the years, Fran worked especially closely and published with S. A. Cain, E. Dahl, and R. G. Wiegert on vegetation and primary production of the old field, with P. J. Clark and R. H. Brand on statistical analyses of spatial patterns and species richness, with W. R. Dawson on bird populations (the two were awarded the Harry R. Painton Award from the Cooper Ornithological Society in 1963 for their collaborative research), and with U. N. Lanham, D. F. Owen, S. K. Gangwere, and W. W. Murdoch on insect communities.

== Selected publications ==
- Evans, F. C.; Vevers, H. G. (1938). "Notes on the Biology of the Faeroe Mouse (Mus musculus faeroensis)". The Journal of Animal Ecology. 7 (2): 290. doi:10.2307/1162. JSTOR 1162.
- Evans, Francis C. (1949). "A Population Study of House Mice (Mus musculus) Following a Period of Local Abundance". Journal of Mammalogy. 30 (4): 351–363. doi:10.2307/1375211. ISSN 0022-2372. JSTOR 1375211.
- Evans, F. C.; Freeman, R. B. (1950). "On the Relationships of Some Mammal Fleas to Their Hosts". Annals of the Entomological Society of America. 43 (3): 320–333. doi:10.1093/aesa/43.3.320. ISSN 1938-2901.
- Evans, Francis C. (1950). "Relative abundance of species and the pyramid of numbers". Ecology. 31 (4): 361–362. doi:10.2307/1931579. hdl:2027.42/119123. JSTOR 1931579.
- Evans, Francis C. (1951). "Notes on a Population of the Striped Ground Squirrel (Citellus tridecemlineatus) in an Abandoned Field in Southeastern Michigan". Journal of Mammalogy. 32 (4): 437–449. doi:10.2307/1375792. JSTOR 1375792.
- Evans, Francis C.; Smith, Frederick E. (1952). "The Intrinsic Rate of Natural Increase for the Human Louse, Pediculus humanus L". The American Naturalist. 86 (830): 299–310. doi:10.1086/281737. S2CID 84657452.
- Clark, Philip J.; Evans, Francis C. (1954). "Distance to Nearest Neighbor as a Measure of Spatial Relationships in Populations". Ecology. 35 (4): 445–453. Bibcode:1954Ecol...35..445C. doi:10.2307/1931034. JSTOR 1931034.
- Evans, Francis C.; Dahl, Eilif (1955). "The Vegetational Structure of an Abandoned Field in Southeastern Michigan and Its Relation to Environmental Factors". Ecology. 36 (4): 685–706. doi:10.2307/1931307. JSTOR 1931307.
- Evans, F. C.; Clark, P. J.; Brand, R. H. (1955). "Estimation of the Number of Species Present on a Given Area". Ecology. 36 (2): 342–343. doi:10.2307/1933244. JSTOR 1933244.
- Evans, F. C. (1956). "Ecosystem as the Basic Unit in Ecology". Science. 123 (3208): 1127–1128. Bibcode:1956Sci...123.1127E. doi:10.1126/science.123.3208.1127. PMID 17793430.
- Wiegert, Richard G.; Evans, Francis C. (1964). "Primary Production and the Disappearance of Dead Vegetation on an Old Field in Southeastern Michigan". Ecology. 45 (1): 49–63. doi:10.2307/1937106. hdl:2027.42/119080. JSTOR 1937106.
- Evans, F. C.; Murdoch, W. W. (1968). "Taxonomic Composition, Trophic Structure and Seasonal Occurrence in a Grassland Insect Community". The Journal of Animal Ecology. 37 (1): 259–273. doi:10.2307/2722. JSTOR 2722.
- Murdoch, William W.; Evans, Francis C.; Peterson, Charles H. (1972). "Diversity and Pattern in Plants and Insects". Ecology. 53 (5): 819–829. doi:10.2307/1934297. JSTOR 1934297.
- Clark, Philip J.; Evans, Francis C. (1979). "Generalization of a Nearest Neighbor Measure of Dispersion for Use in K Dimensions". Ecology. 60 (2): 316–317. doi:10.2307/1937660. JSTOR 1937660.
