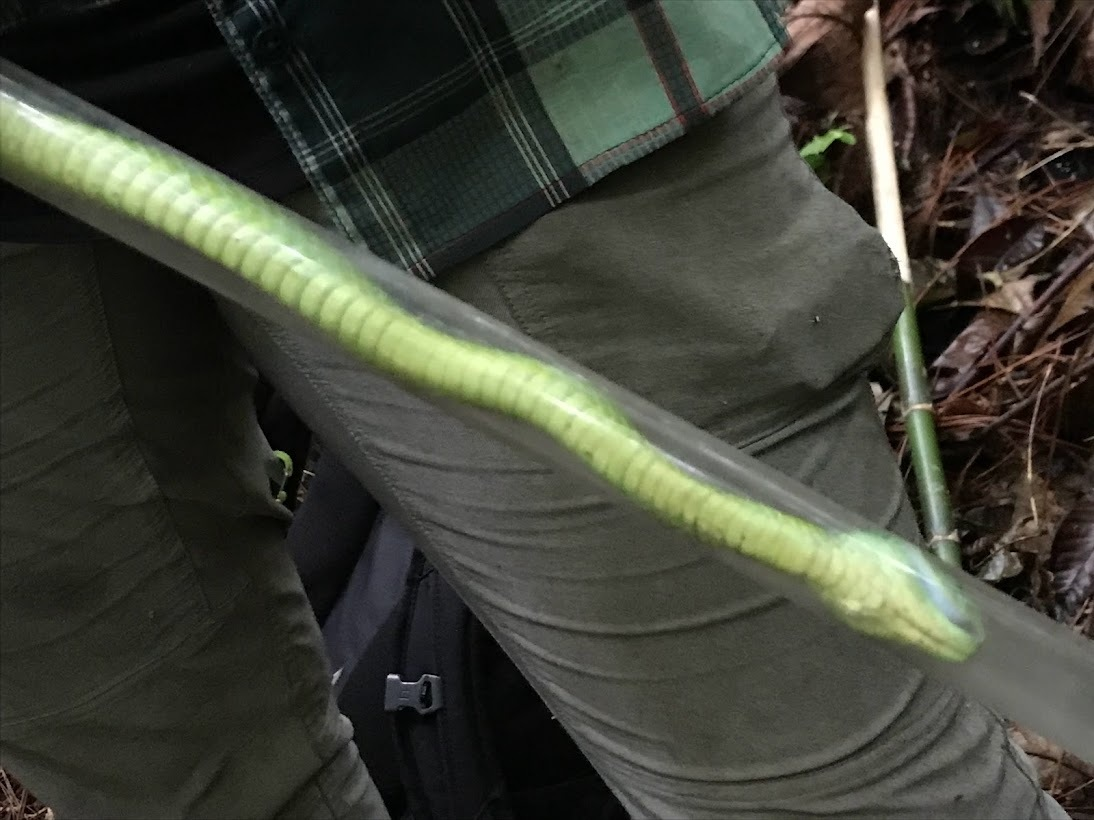

Conservation status
- Endangered (IUCN 3.1)

Scientific classification
- Kingdom: Animalia
- Phylum: Chordata
- Class: Reptilia
- Order: Squamata
- Suborder: Serpentes
- Family: Viperidae
- Genus: Bothriechis
- Species: B. marchi

Binomial name
- Bothriechis marchi (Barbour & Loveridge, 1929)

Synonyms
- Bothrops nigroviridis marchi Barbour & Loveridge, 1929; Trimeresurus nigroviridis marchi — Clark & Inger, 1942; Bothrops nigroviridis marchii — J. Peters & Orejas-Miranda, 1970; Bothriechis nigroviridis marchi — Hoge & Romano-Hoge, 1983; [Bothrops nigroviridis] marchi — Wilson & J. Meyer, 1982; Bothriechis aurifer marchi — Burger, 1985; Bothriechis marchi — Campbell & Lamar, 1989

= Bothriechis marchi =

Species of snake

Bothriechis marchi, also known commonly as the Honduran palm pit viper and March's palm pit viper, is a species of pit viper, a venomous snake, in the subfamily Crotalinae of the family Viperidae. The species is native to Central America. There are no subspecies that are recognized as being valid.

== Etymology ==
The specific name, marchi, is in honor of herpetologist Douglas H. March, who died from the bite of a fer-de-lance in 1939.

== Description ==
Adults of Bothriechis marchi often grow to more than 80 centimetres (31 in) in total length (tail included). The largest specimen on record was 96.8 centimetres (38.1 in). March's palm pit viper is green and relatively slender with a prehensile tail.

== Geographic range ==
Bothriechis marchi is found on the Atlantic versant of northwestern Honduras. Its range might extend into eastern Guatemala. Records from Nicaragua are probably in error. It occurs in mesic forest at elevations of 500–1,500 metres (1,600–4,900 ft) altitude. The type locality given is "the Gold Mines at Quimistan [probably El Oro, Municipio de Quimistán, in the Sierra de Espíritu Santo to the northwest of the town of Quimistán], [Departamento de] Santa Barbara, Honduras Republic".

== Reproduction ==
Bothriechis marchi is viviparous.1
