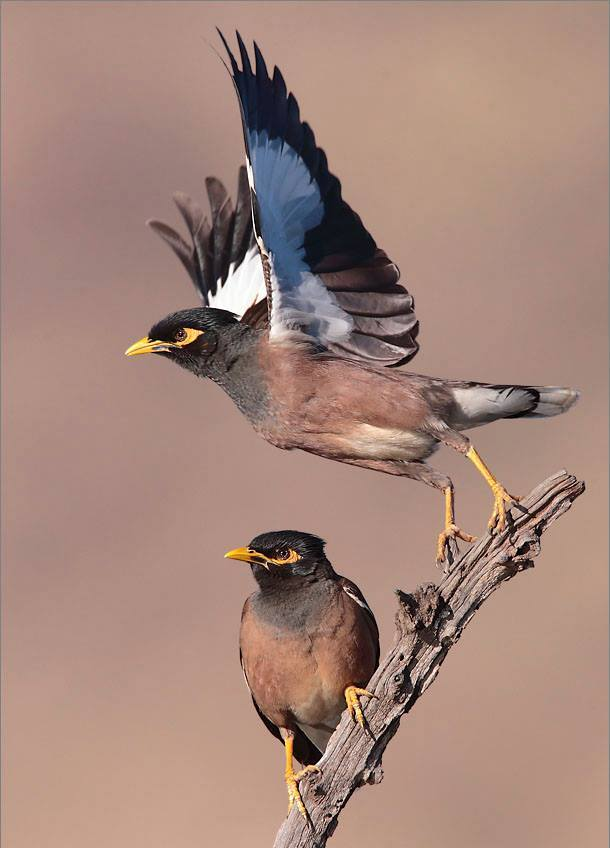
- Kokrebellur, India

Conservation status
- Least Concern (IUCN 3.1)

Scientific classification
- Kingdom: Animalia
- Phylum: Chordata
- Class: Aves
- Order: Passeriformes
- Family: Sturnidae
- Genus: Acridotheres
- Species: A. tristis

Binomial name
- Acridotheres tristis (Linnaeus, 1766)

Subspecies
- Acridotheres tristis melanosternus Acridotheres tristis tristis
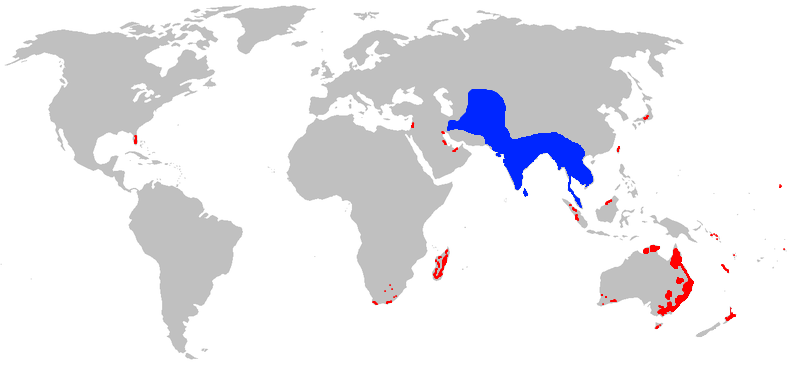
- Native distribution in blue, introduced in red

Synonyms
- Paradisaea tristis Linnaeus, 1766

Audio

= Common myna =

Bird of the family Sturnidae

The common myna or Indian myna (Acridotheres tristis), sometimes spelled mynah, (Note: Pronouned in both spellings as /ˈmaɪnə/.) is a bird in the family Sturnidae, native to Asia. An omnivorous open woodland bird with a strong territorial instinct, the common myna has adapted extremely well to urban environments.

The range of the common myna is increasing at such a rapid rate that in 2000 the IUCN Species Survival Commission declared it one of the world's most invasive species and one of only three birds listed among "100 of the World's Worst Invasive Species" that pose a threat to biodiversity, agriculture and human interests. In particular, the species poses a serious threat to the ecosystems of Australia, where it was named "The Most Important Pest/Problem" in 2008.

== Taxonomy ==
In 1760, the French zoologist Mathurin Jacques Brisson included a description of the common myna in his Ornithologie, based on a specimen that he mistakenly believed had been collected in the Philippines. He used the French name Le merle des Philippines and the Latin Merula Philippensis. Although Brisson coined Latin names, they do not conform to the binomial system and are not recognised by the International Commission on Zoological Nomenclature.

When the Swedish naturalist, Carl Linnaeus, updated his Systema Naturae in 1766, for the 12th edition, he added 240 species that had been previously described by Brisson. One of them was the common myna. Linnaeus included a brief description, coined the binomial name Paradisea tristis and cited Brisson's work. The type location was subsequently corrected to Pondicherry in southern India.

=== Etymology ===
The specific name tristis is Latin for "sad" or "gloomy".

This species is now placed in the genus Acridotheres that was introduced by the French ornithologist Louis Pierre Vieillot in 1816. The generic name Acridotheres is from the Ancient Greek: ἀκρίς : akrís, genitive ἀκρίδος : akrídos meaning locust, and Ancient Greek: θηρής : thērḗs, meaning hunter.

=== Subspecies ===
Two subspecies are recognised:

- the Indian myna (A. t. tristis) (Linnaeus, 1766) – It is found from southern Kazakhstan, Turkmenistan and eastern Iran to southern China, Indochina, the Malay Peninsula and southern India. It has also been introduced to Hawai‘i and North America. Populations from the northwest of its range have sometimes been separated as a distinct subspecies, A. t. neumanni, while populations from Nepal and Myanmar have been described as A. t. tristoides.
- the Sri Lankan common myna (A. t. melanosternus) Legge, 1879 – Sri Lanka

The Sri Lankan subspecies melanosternus is darker than the Indian subspecies tristis and has half-black and half-white primary coverts and a larger yellow cheek-patch.

== Description ==
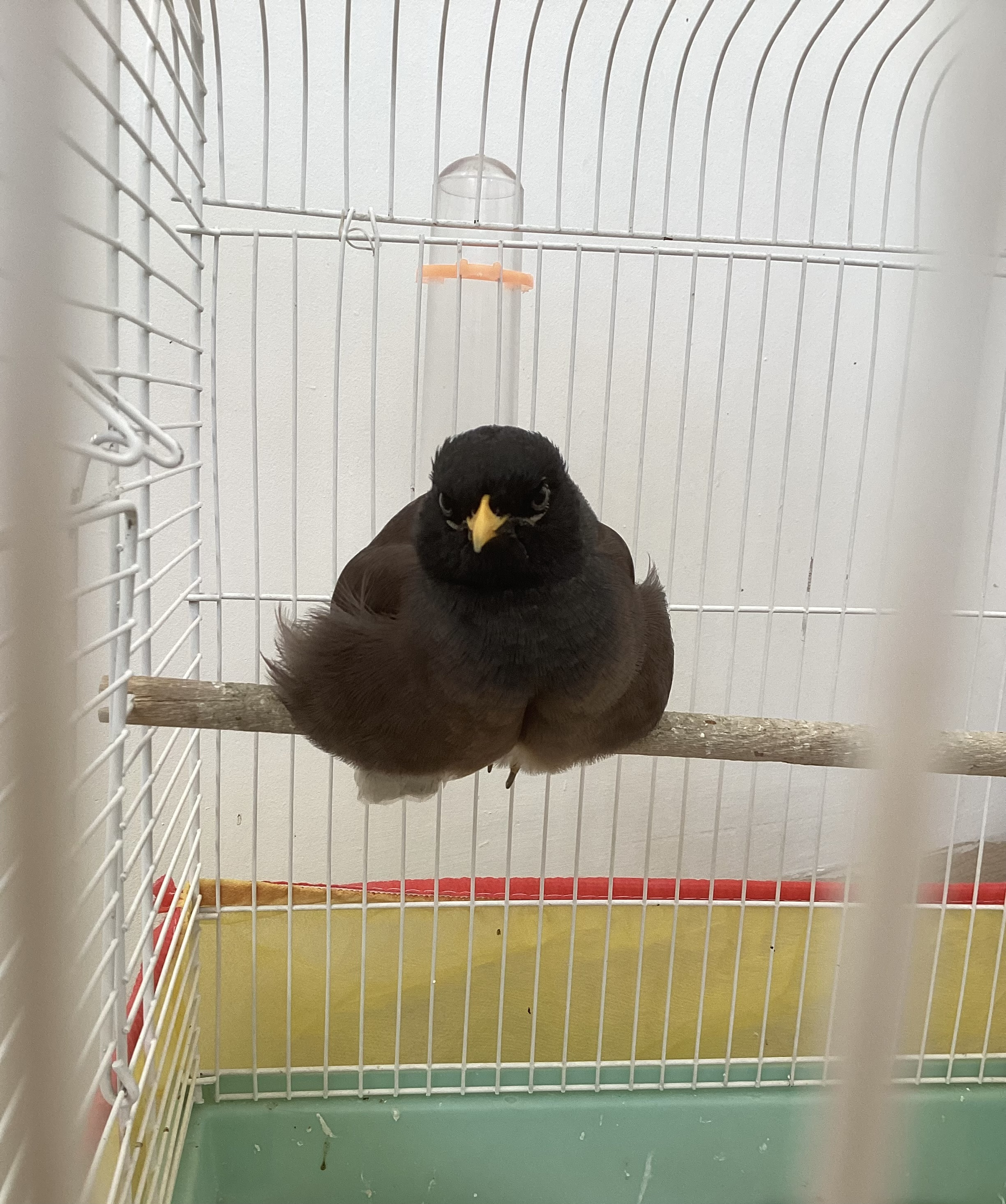
Common myna in a cage

The common myna is readily identified by the brown body, black hooded head and the bare yellow patch behind the eye. The bill and legs are bright yellow. They have rounded wings as well, and a round square tipped tail. There is a white patch on the outer primaries and the wing lining on the underside is white, as well as having a white tail tip. The sexes are similar in colour and birds are usually seen in pairs. The common myna obeys Gloger's rule in that the birds from northwestern India tend to be paler than their darker counterparts in southern India.

=== Vocalization ===
The calls includes croaks, squawks, chirps, clicks, whistles and 'growls', and the bird often fluffs its feathers and bobs its head in singing. The common myna screeches warnings to its mate or other birds in cases of predators in proximity or when it is about to take off flying. Common mynas are popular as cage birds for their singing and "speaking" abilities. Before sleeping in communal roosts, common mynas vocalise in unison, which is known as "communal noise".

=== Characteristics ===
The common myna has clear sexual dimorphism in weight, with males having an average weight of 109.8g, and females weighing from 120g-138g. Despite females on average being heavier, male common mynas are longer than females, with an average length of 23.82cm compared to a females average length of 22.97cm.

== Distribution and habitat ==
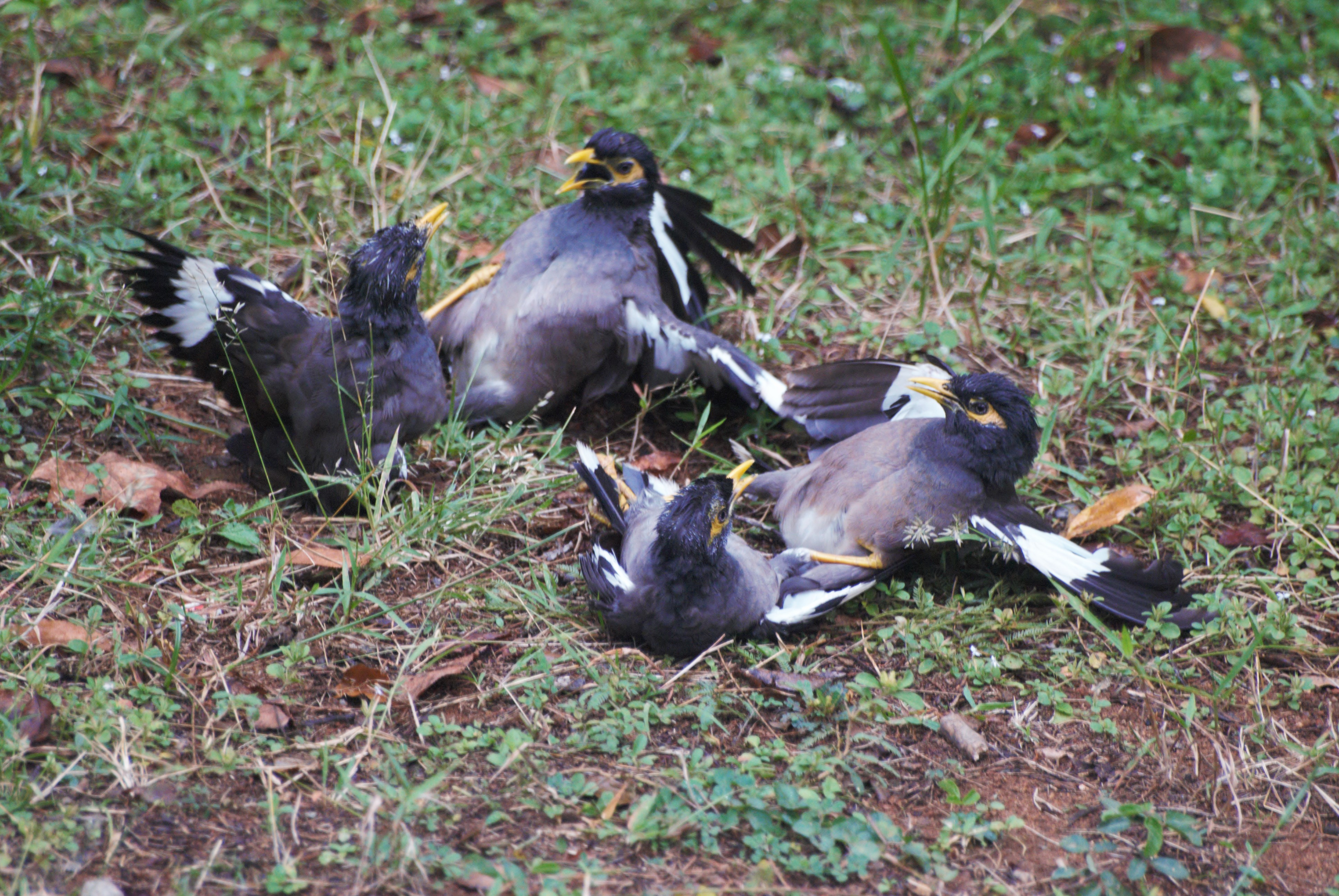
Fighting, Madagascar

The common myna is native to Asia, with its initial home range spanning Iran, Pakistan, India, Nepal, Bhutan, Bangladesh and Sri Lanka, Afghanistan, Uzbekistan, Tajikistan, Turkmenistan, Myanmar, Malaysia, Singapore, peninsular Thailand, Indochina, Japan (both mainland Japan and the Ryukyu Islands) and China.

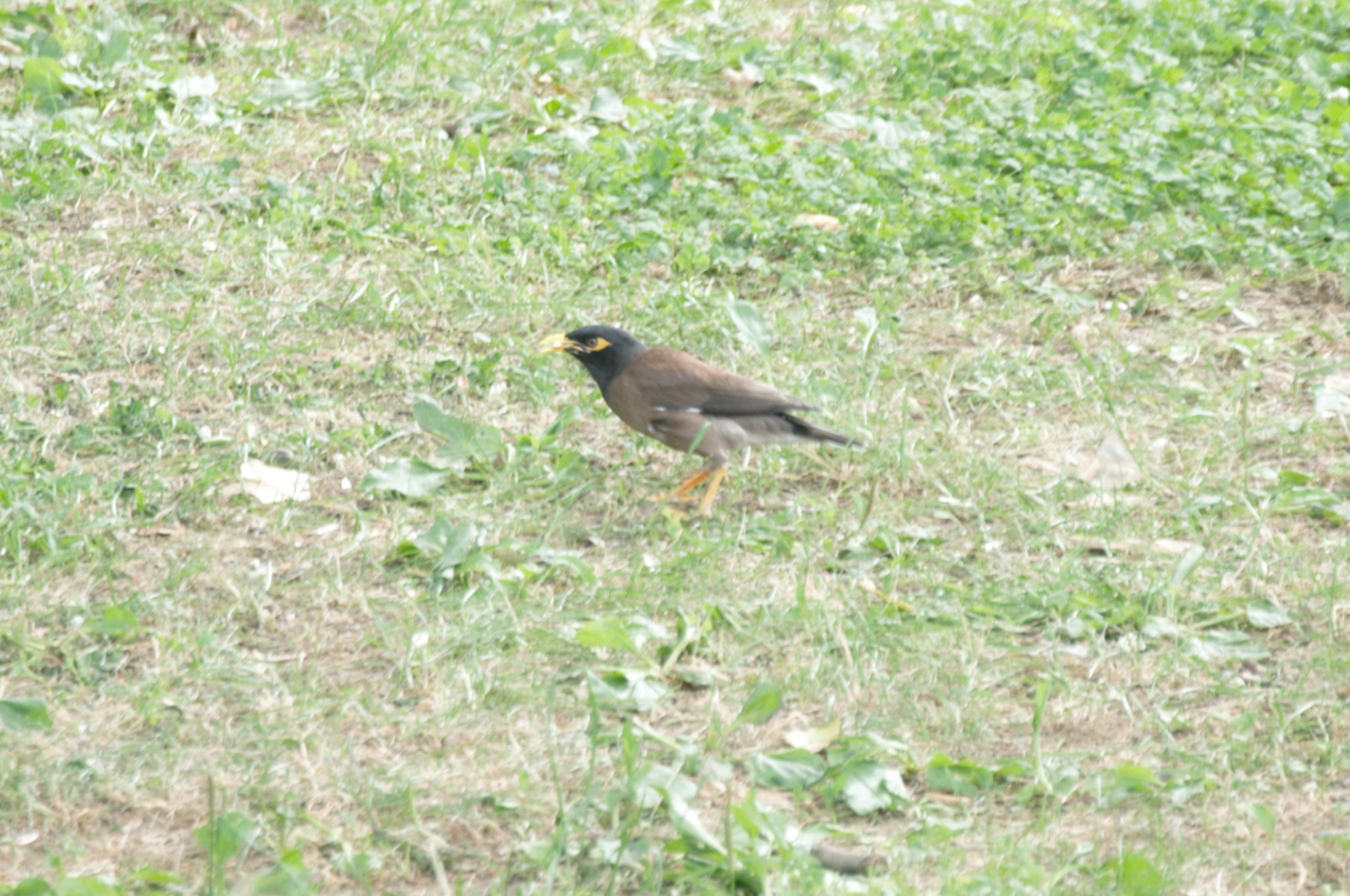
A common myna as an invasive species in Gülhane Park, Turkey

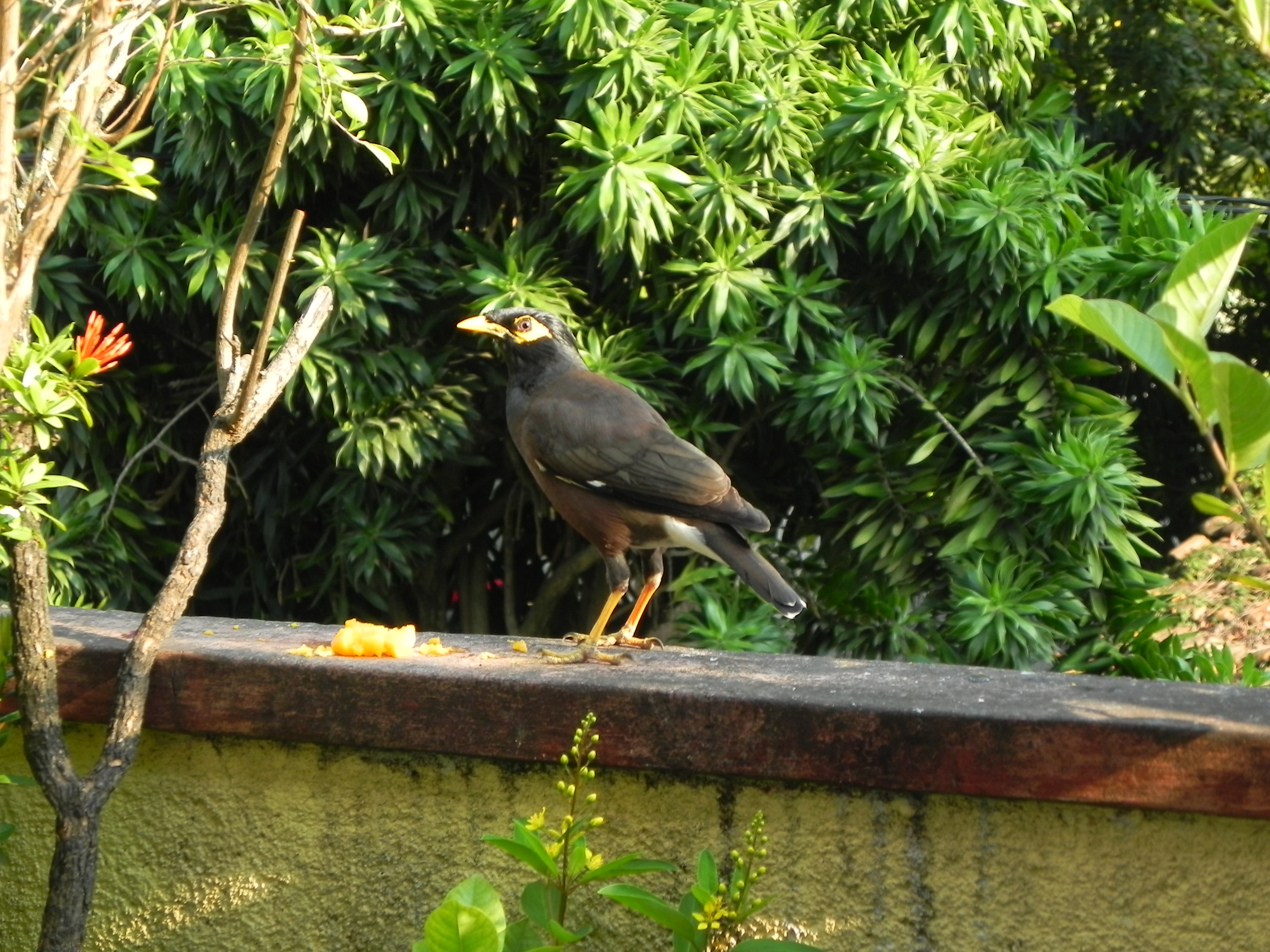
Visiting a home garden in Colombo, Sri Lanka

The common myna has been introduced to many other parts of the world such as Canada, Australia, Turkey, Israel, New Zealand, New Caledonia, Fiji, the United States (South Florida and Hawaii), South Africa, Kazakhstan, Kyrgyzstan, Cayman Islands, Islands in the Indian Ocean (the Seychelles – from which it was subsequently eradicated at great expense, Mauritius, Réunion, Madagascar, the Maldives, the Andaman and Nicobar Islands and the Lakshadweep archipelago) and also in islands of the Atlantic (such as Ascension and Saint Helena), Pacific Ocean and Cyprus, as of February 2022. The range of the common myna is increasing to the extent that in 2000 the IUCN Species Survival Commission declared it among 100 of the world's worst invasive species.

It is typically found in open woodland, cultivation and around habitation. Although it is an adaptable species, its population is abnormal and very much considered a pest in Singapore (where it is locally called as gembala kerbau, literally 'buffalo shepherd') due to competition with the related introduced Javan myna.

The common myna thrives in urban and suburban environments; in Canberra, for instance, 110 common mynas were released between 1968 and 1971. By 1991, common myna population density in Canberra averaged 15 birds per square kilometer. Only three years later, a second study found an average population density of 75 birds per square kilometer in the same area.

The bird likely owes its success in the urban and suburban settings of Sydney and Canberra to its evolutionary origins; having evolved in the open woodlands of India, the common myna is pre-adapted to habitats with tall vertical structures and little to no vegetative ground cover, features characteristic of city streets and urban nature preserves.

The common myna (along with common starlings, house sparrows, and feral rock doves) is a nuisance to city buildings; its nests block gutters and drainpipes, causing water damage to building exteriors.

== Behaviour ==
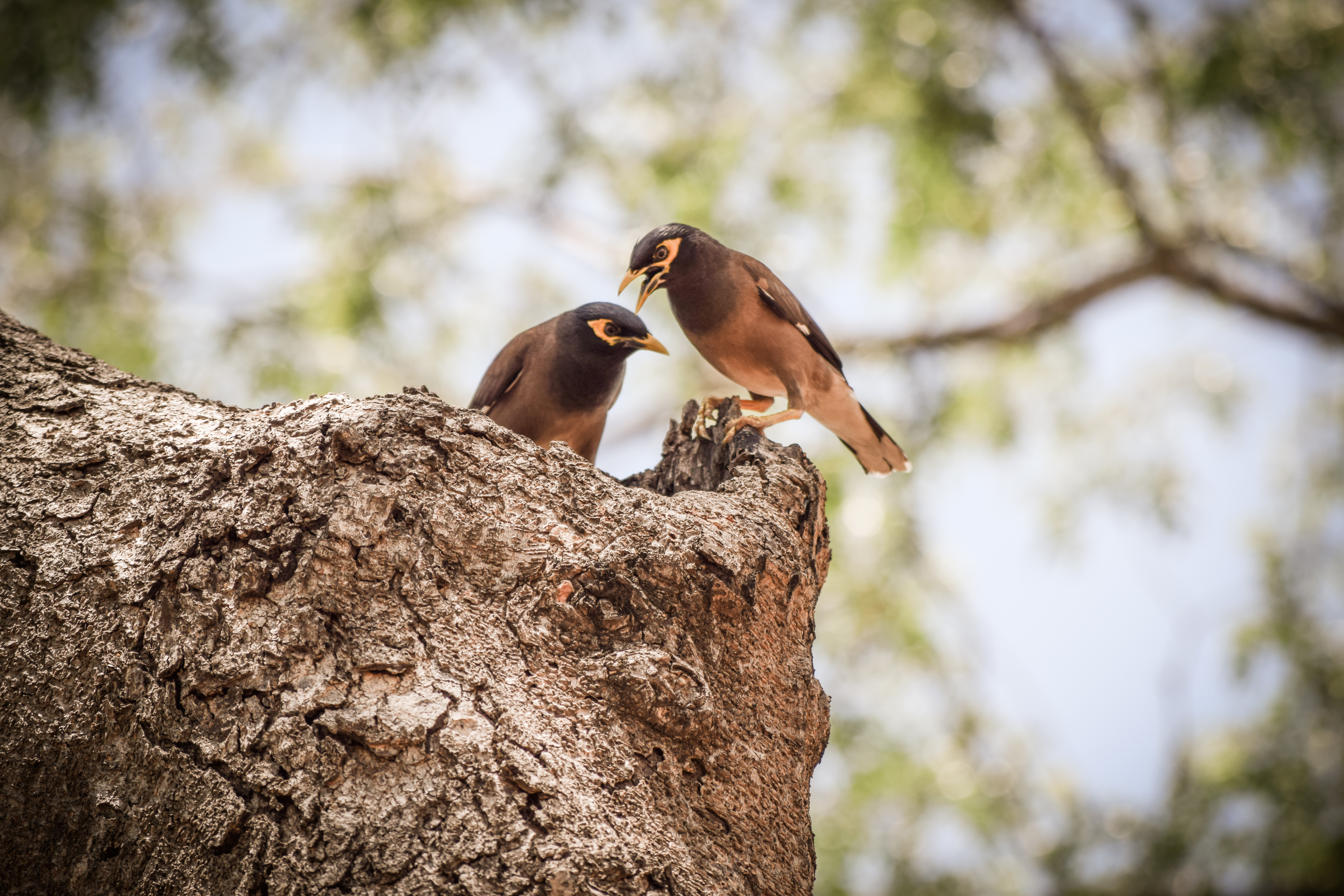
In Guntur, India

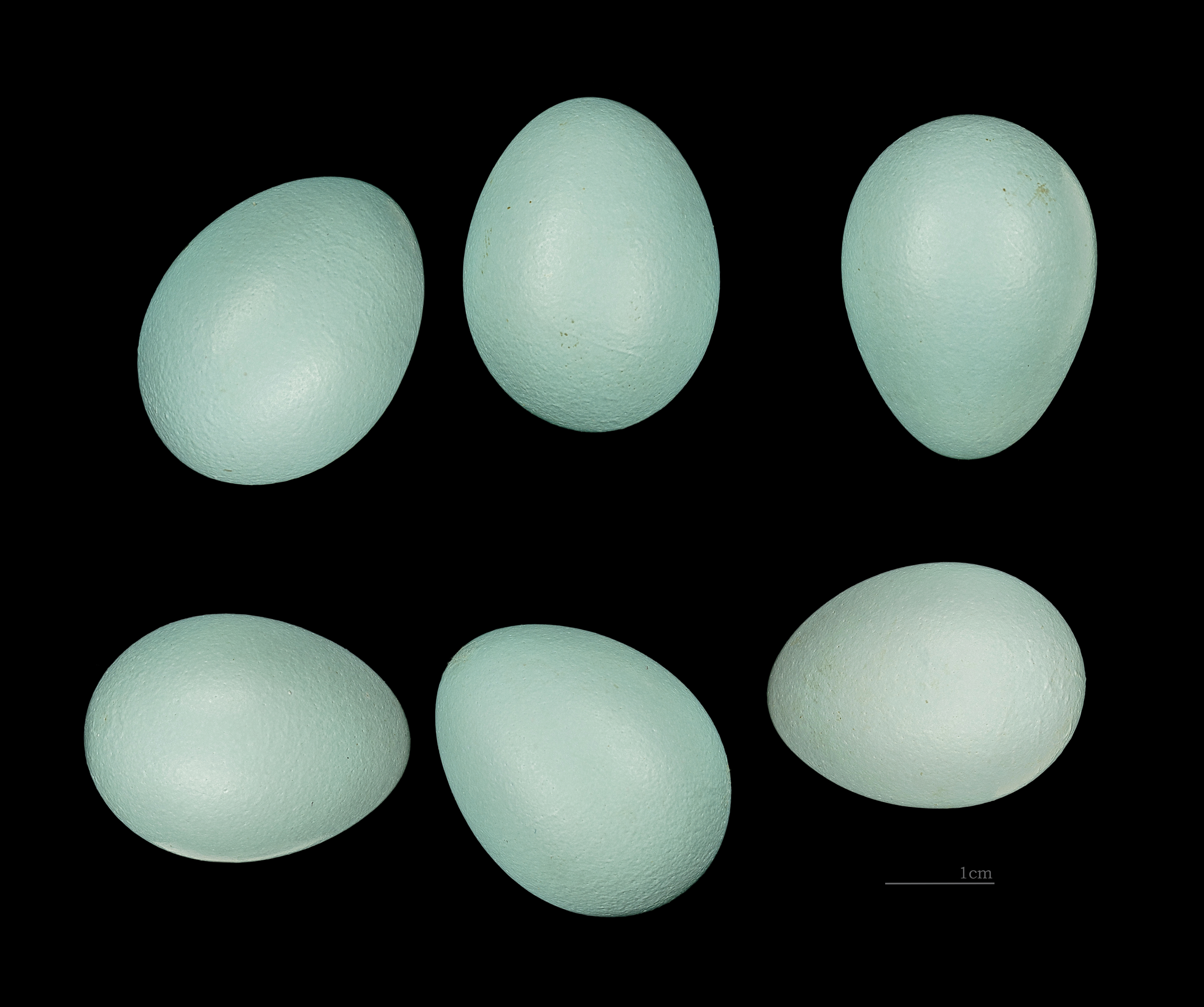

=== Breeding ===
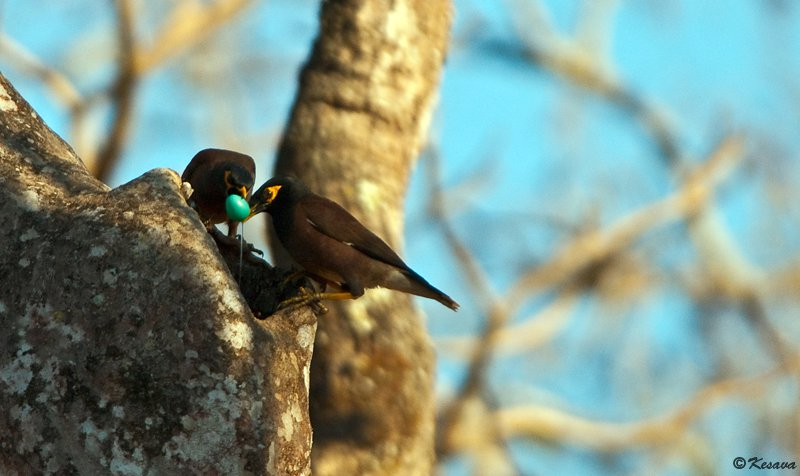
Evicting a nest of jungle babblers by breaking their eggs

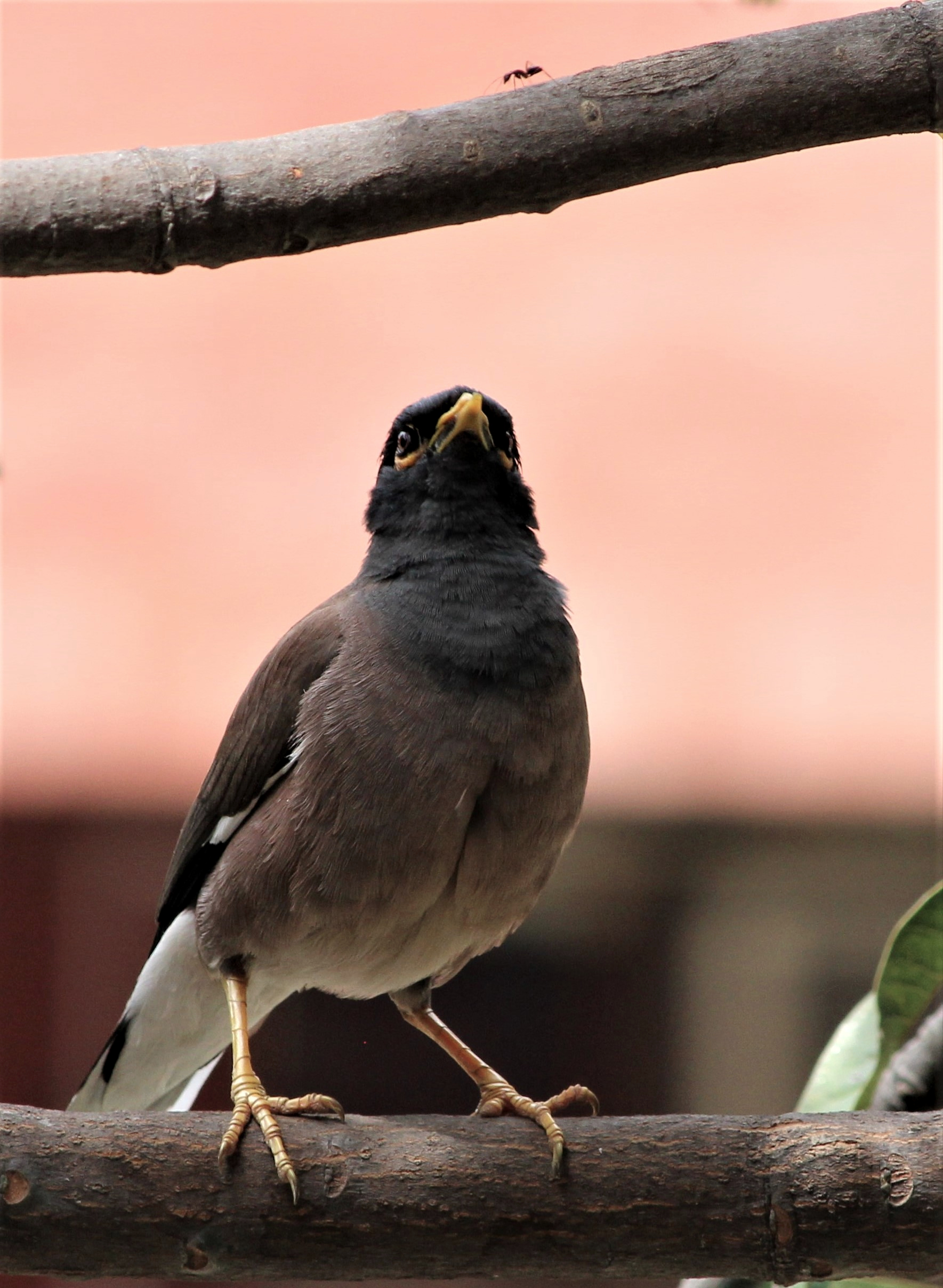
In Chandigarh

Common mynas are believed to pair for life. They breed through much of the year depending on the location, building their nest in a hole in a tree or wall. They breed at elevations of 0–3,000 m (0–9,843 ft) in the Himalayas.

The normal clutch size is 4–6 eggs. The average size of the egg is 30.8 by 21.99 millimetres (1 1/4 in × 3/4 in). The incubation period is 17 to 18 days and fledging period is 22 to 24 days. The Asian koel is sometimes brood parasitic on this species. Nesting material used by common mynas includes twigs, roots, tow and rubbish. Common mynas have been known to use tissue paper, tin foil and sloughed off snake-skin.

During the breeding season, the daytime activity-time budget of the common myna in Pune in April to June 1978 has been recorded to comprise the following: nesting activity (42%), scanning the environment (28%), locomotion (12%), feeding (4%), vocalisation (7%) and preening-related activities, interactions and other activities (7%).

The common myna uses the nests of woodpeckers, parakeets, etc. and easily takes to nest boxes; it has been recorded evicting the chicks of previously nesting pairs by holding them in the beak and later sometimes not even using the emptied nest boxes. This aggressive behaviour contributes to its success as an invasive species.

There is also some evidence that shows that in introduced environments, the species chooses to nest in more modified and artificial structures than in natural tree cavities when compared to native species.

=== Food and feeding ===
Like most starlings, the common myna is omnivorous. It feeds on insects, grubs, earthworms, arachnids, crustaceans, reptiles, small mammals, seeds, grain, fruits, flower nectar and petals, and discarded waste from human habitation. It forages on the ground among grass for insects, and especially for grasshoppers, from which it gets the generic name Acridotheres, "grasshopper hunter". It, however, feeds on a wide range of insects, mostly picked from the ground. It is a cross-pollinator of flowers such as Salmalia and Erythrina. It walks on the ground with occasional hops and is an opportunistic feeder on the insects disturbed by grazing cattle as well as fired grass fields. They prey on eggs and young of other birds, such as Hawaiʻi ʻakepas (Loxops coccineus). They sometimes even wade in shallow waters to catch fish. Living in close proximity to human-made habitats, common mynas may also appear near roadsides to feed on roadkill.

=== Roosting behaviour ===
Common mynas roost communally throughout the year, either in pure or mixed flocks with jungle mynas, rosy starlings, house crows, jungle crows, cattle egrets and rose-ringed parakeets and other birds. The roost population can range from less than one hundred to thousands. The time of arrival of mynas at the roost starts before and ends just after sunset. The mynas depart before sunrise. The time and timespan of arrival and departure, time taken for final settlement at the roost, duration of communal sleep, flock size and population vary seasonally.

The function of communal roosting is to synchronise various social activities, avoid predators, exchange information about food sources.

Communal displays (pre-roosting and post-roosting) consist of aerial maneuvers which are exhibited in the pre-breeding season (November to March). It is assumed that this behaviour is related to pair formation.

== Invasive species ==
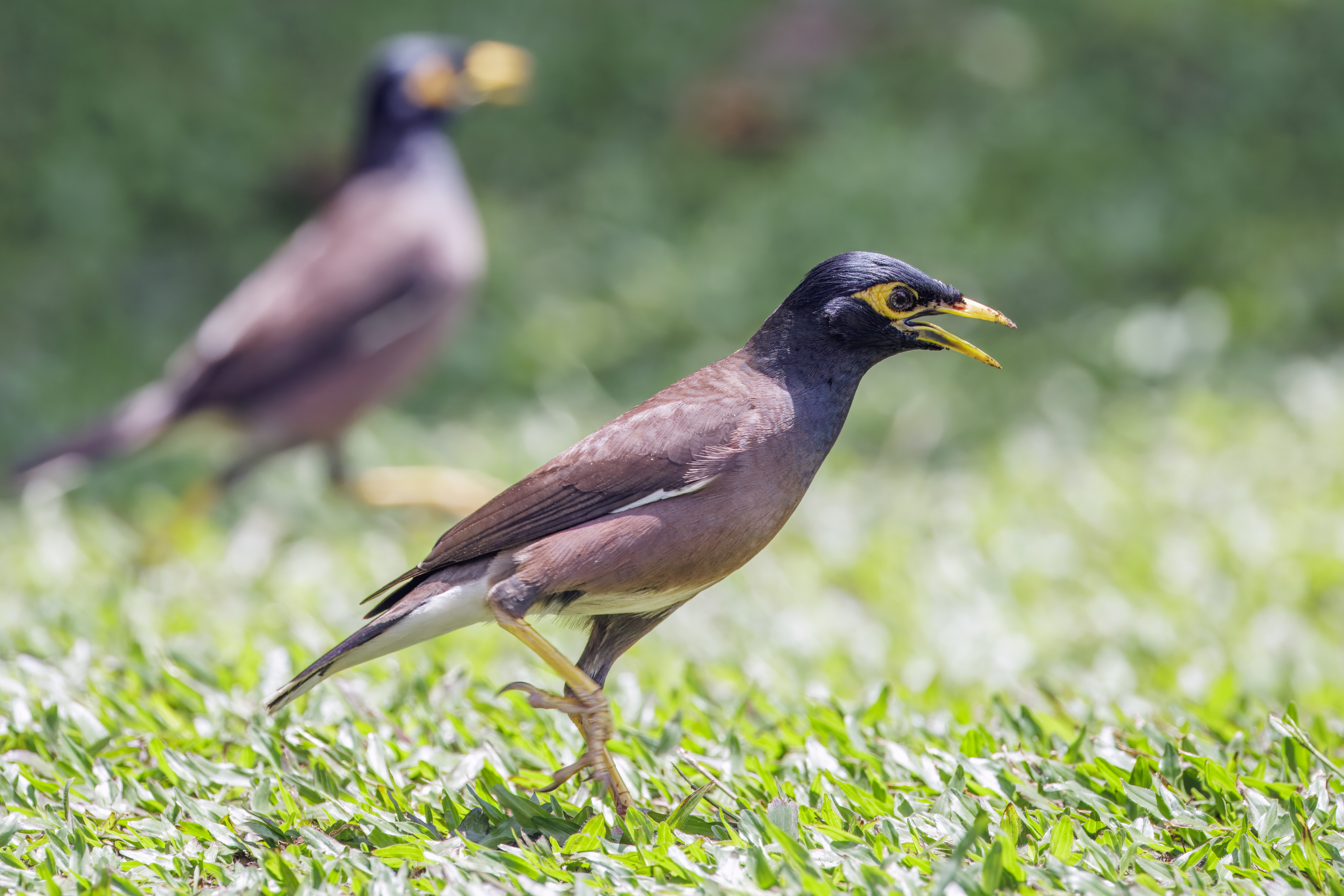
on Upolu, Samoa

The IUCN declared the common myna as one of only three birds among the world's 100 worst invasive species (the other two being the red-vented bulbul and the common starling). The French introduced it in the 18th century from Pondicherry to Mauritius with the aim of controlling insects, even levying a fine on anyone persecuting the bird. It has since been introduced widely elsewhere, including adjacent areas in Southeast Asia, Madagascar, the Middle East, South Africa, the United States, Argentina, Germany, Spain and Portugal, the United Kingdom, Australia, New Zealand and various oceanic islands in the Indian and Pacific Oceans, including prominent populations in Fiji and Hawaii.

The common myna is regarded as a pest in South Africa, North America, the Middle East, Australia, New Zealand and many Pacific islands. It is particularly problematic in Australia. Several methods have been tried to control the bird's numbers and protect native species.

=== Australia ===
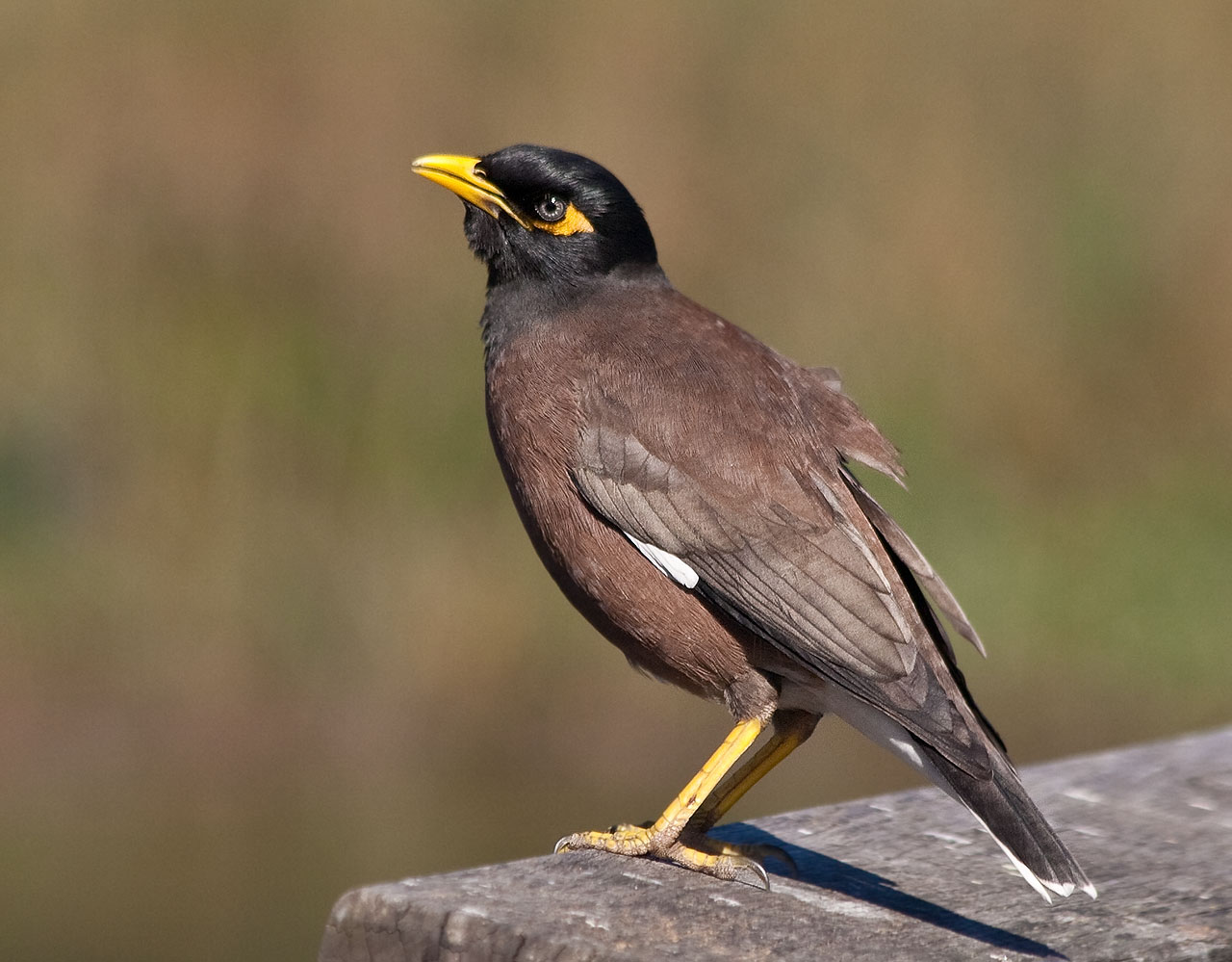
In Sydney

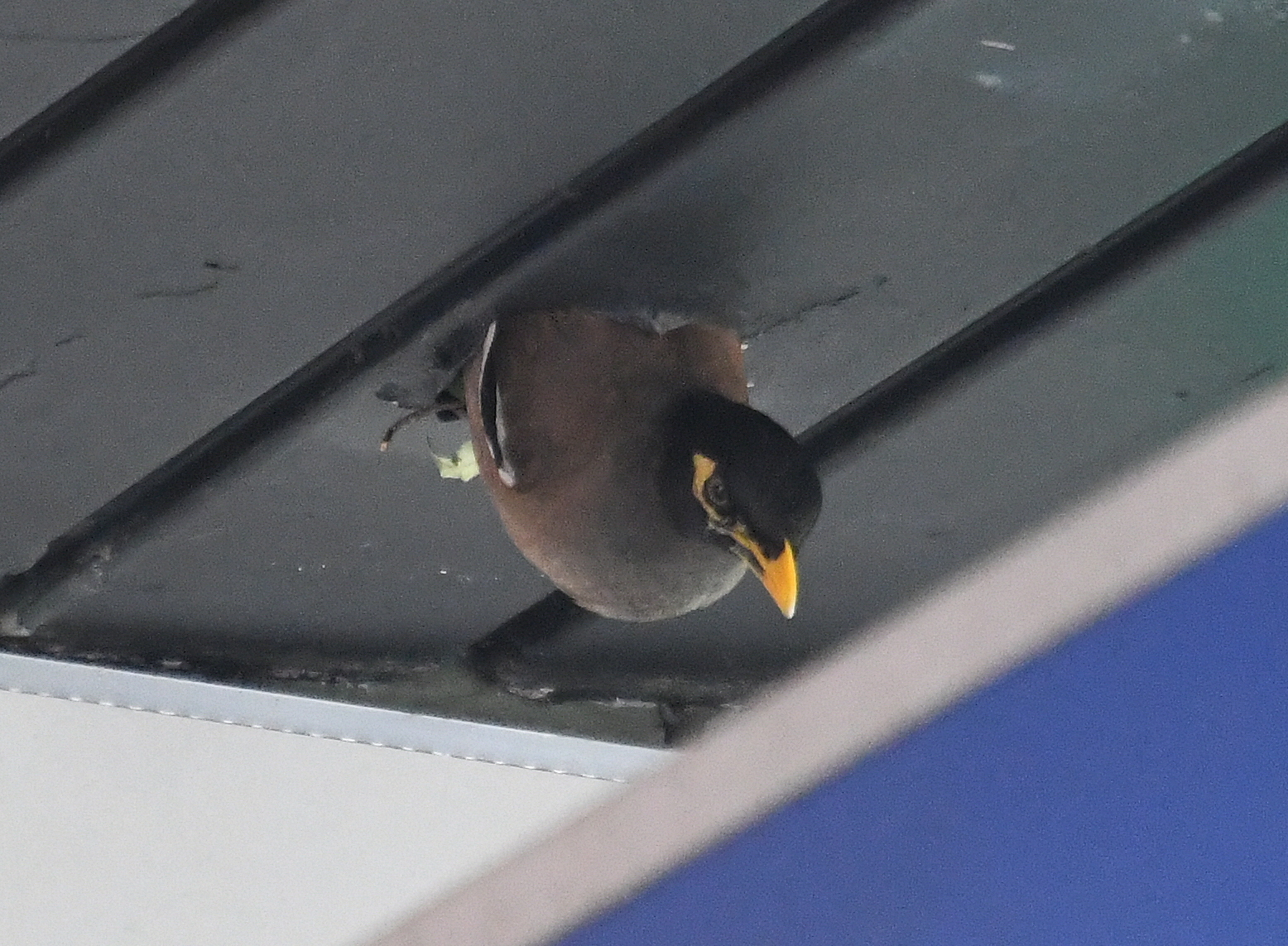
Nesting in a shop awning, Sydney

In Australia, the common myna is an invasive pest. They are often the predominant bird in urban areas along the whole east coast. In a 2008 popular vote, the bird was named "The Most Important Pest/Problem" in Australia. They have earned the nickname "flying rats", due to their numbers and their scavenging behaviour. They are also known as "the cane toad of the sky". However, there is little scientific consensus concerning the extent of its impact on native species.

The common myna was first introduced to Australia between 1863 and 1872, in Victoria, to control insects in the market gardens of Melbourne. At about the same time, the bird is likely to have spread to New South Wales, where it is currently most populous, but documentation is uncertain. The bird was later introduced to Queensland as a predator of grasshoppers and cane beetles. Common myna populations in Australia are now concentrated along the eastern coast around Sydney and its surrounding suburbs, with sparser populations in Victoria and a few isolated communities in Queensland. During 2009, several municipal councils in New South Wales began trials of catching myna birds in an effort to reduce numbers.

The myna can live and breed in a wide range of temperatures, ranging from the frosty winters of Canberra to the tropical climate of Cairns. Self-sustaining populations have been found in regions with a mean monthly highest temperature no less than 23.2 °C (73.8 °F) and a mean monthly lowest temperature no less than −0.4 °C (31.3 °F), implying that the common myna could spread from Sydney northwards along the eastern coast to Cairns, and westwards along the southern coast to Adelaide, but not to Tasmania, Darwin, or the arid outback regions.

=== Europe ===
In 2019, common mynas were added to the List of Invasive Alien Species of Union concern. They have established in Spain and Portugal and were introduced to France, where they occasionally bred.

=== New Zealand ===
The common myna was introduced to both the North Island and South Island of New Zealand in the 1870s. However, the cooler summer temperatures in the South Island appear to have impeded the breeding success rate of the southern populations, preventing the proliferation of the species, which was largely non-existent there by the 1890s. In contrast, the North Island population was able to breed more successfully and large portions of the North Island are now populated. However, in the southern reaches of the North Island, the cooler summer temperatures, like those of the South Island, have prevented the establishment of large myna populations. Since the 1950s, mynas have spread northwards and presently inhabit beyond the Waikato region, leading to a majority of its successful population thriving upon lower latitude regions due to the warmer climate. At present, mynas have become especially common in regions of lower latitude, particularly the Northland region, but rarely found south of Whanganui.

=== South Africa ===
In South Africa, where it escaped into the wild in 1902, it has become very common and its distribution is greater where human populations are greater or where there is more human disturbance. The bird is also notorious for being a pest, kicking other birds out of their nests and killing their young due to the myna's strong territorial instinct. It is considered somewhat of a major pest and disturbance of the natural habitat; as a result, it has been declared an invasive species, requiring it to be controlled.

Morphological studies show that the process of spatial sorting is at work on the range expansion of A. tristis in South Africa. Dispersal-relevant traits are significantly correlated with distance from the range core, with strong sexual dimorphism, indicative of sex-biased dispersal. Morphological variations are significant in wing and head traits of females, suggesting females as the primary dispersing sex. In contrast, traits not related to dispersal such as those associated with foraging show no signs of spatial sorting but are significantly affected by environmental variables such as vegetation and intensity of urbanisation. To study the invasion genetics and landscape-scale dynamics of A. tristis in South Africa, scientists have recently developed 16 polymorphic nuclear microsatellite markers using the next generation sequencing (NGS) approach.

=== United States ===
In Hawaii, it is out-competing many native birds for food and nesting areas.

=== Israel ===
In the late 1990s a few myna birds had escaped or were released from captivity in Tel-Aviv. Since then its wild population had exploded, and in a birding survey in 2024 it was found to be the second most observed bird in Israel. It is presumed to be responsible for the decline in the populations of some of Israel's common native birds.

=== Effect on ecosystems and humans ===
==== Threat to native birds ====
The common myna is a hollow-nesting species; that is, it nests and breeds in protected hollows found either naturally in trees or artificially on buildings (for example, recessed windowsills or low eaves). Compared to native hollow-nesting species, the common myna is extremely aggressive, and breeding males will actively defend areas ranging up to 0.83 hectares in size (though males in densely populated urban settings tend to only defend the area immediately surrounding their nests).

This aggressiveness has enabled the common myna to displace many breeding pairs of native hollow-nesters, thereby reducing their reproductive success. In Australia, their aggressiveness has enabled them to chase native birds as large as galahs out of their nests.

The common myna is also known to maintain up to two roosts simultaneously; a temporary summer roost close to a breeding site (where the entire local male community sleeps during the summer, the period of highest aggression), and a permanent all-year roost where the female broods and incubates overnight. Both male and female common mynas will fiercely protect both roosts at all times, leading to further exclusion of native birds.

==== Threat to crops and pasture ====
The common myna (which feeds mostly on ground-dwelling insects, tropical fruits such as grapes, plums and some berries and, in urban areas, discarded human food) poses a serious threat to Australian blueberry crops, though its main threat is to native bird species.

In Hawaii, where the common myna was introduced to control pest armyworms and cutworms in sugarcane crops, the bird has helped to spread the robust Lantana camara weed across the islands' open grasslands. It also has been recorded as the fourth-ranking avian pest in the fruit industry by a 2004 survey of the Hawaiian Farm Bureau and the sixth in number of complaints of avian pests overall.

Common mynas can cause considerable damage to ripening fruit, particularly grapes, but also figs, apples, pears, strawberries, blueberries, guava, mangoes and breadfruit. Cereal crops such as maize, wheat and rice are susceptible where they occur near urban areas. Roosting and nesting commensal with humans create aesthetic and health concerns. Common mynas are known to carry avian malaria and exotic parasites such as the Ornithonyssus bursia mite, which can cause dermatitis in humans. The common myna can help spread agricultural weeds: for example, it spreads the seeds of Lantana camara, which has been classed as a Weed of National Significance because of its invasiveness. Common mynas are regularly observed to usurp nests and hollows, destroy the eggs and kill the young of native bird species, including seabirds and parrots. There is evidence that common mynas have killed small land mammals such as mice, squirrels and possums, but further research on these occurrences is under consideration.

=== Control ===
The common myna, being a major agricultural pest and posing a threat to native species in non-native countries, is controlled by various factors. Mynas are either killed or chased away as control. Poison, shooting, cage traps, and bird-scaring devices are currently used for control.

== In culture ==
In Sanskrit literature, the common myna has a number of names, most are descriptive of the appearance or behaviour of the bird. In addition to सारिका (IAST: sārikā), the names for the common myna include कलहप्रिया (IAST: kalahapriyā), which means "one who is fond of arguments" referring to the quarrelsome nature of this bird; चित्रनेत्र (IAST: chitranetra), meaning "pretty eyes", पीतनेत्र (IAST: pītanetra), "yellow-eyes" and पीतपाद (IAST: pītapāda), "yellow-legs".

The bird called śārikā (Sanskrit: सारिक or शारिका) (Note: Also śāri (Sanskrit: शारि)) most often refers to the common myna, (Note: Turdus salica is actually not a thrush but a synonym of Acridotheres tristis, the common myna.) though there are other candidates.

== Gallery ==
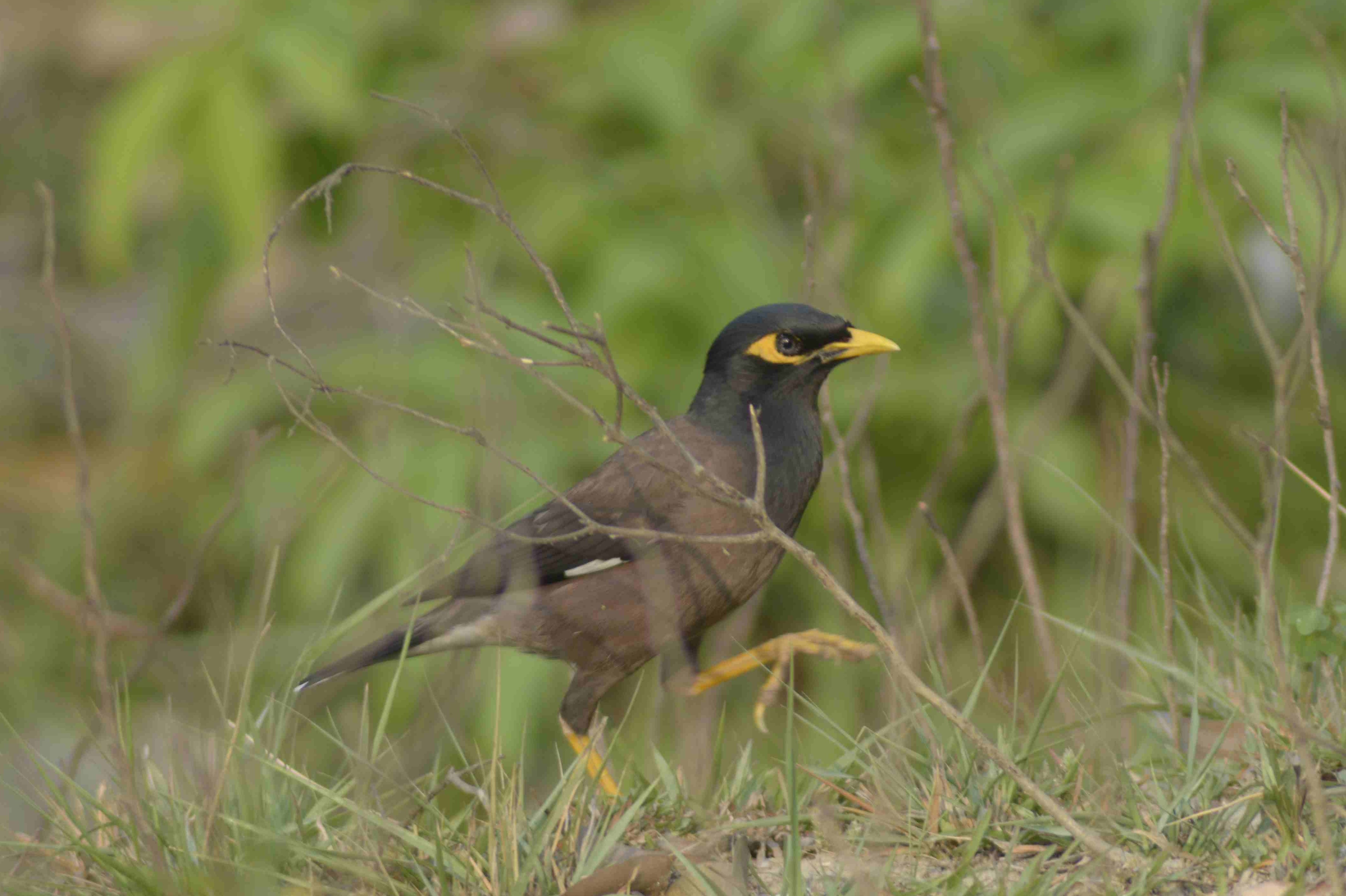
Raiganj, WB, India

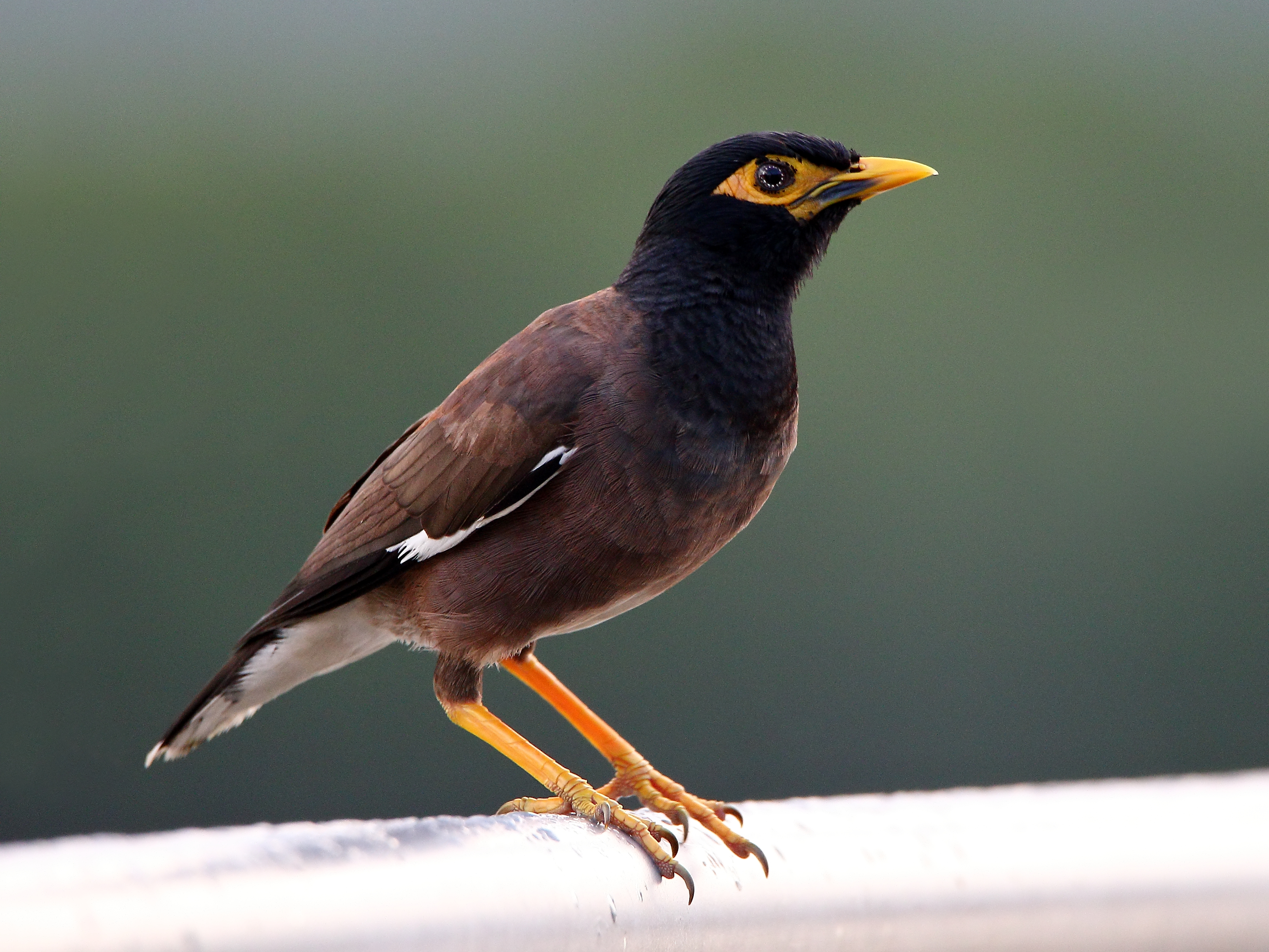
Cairns, Queensland, Australia

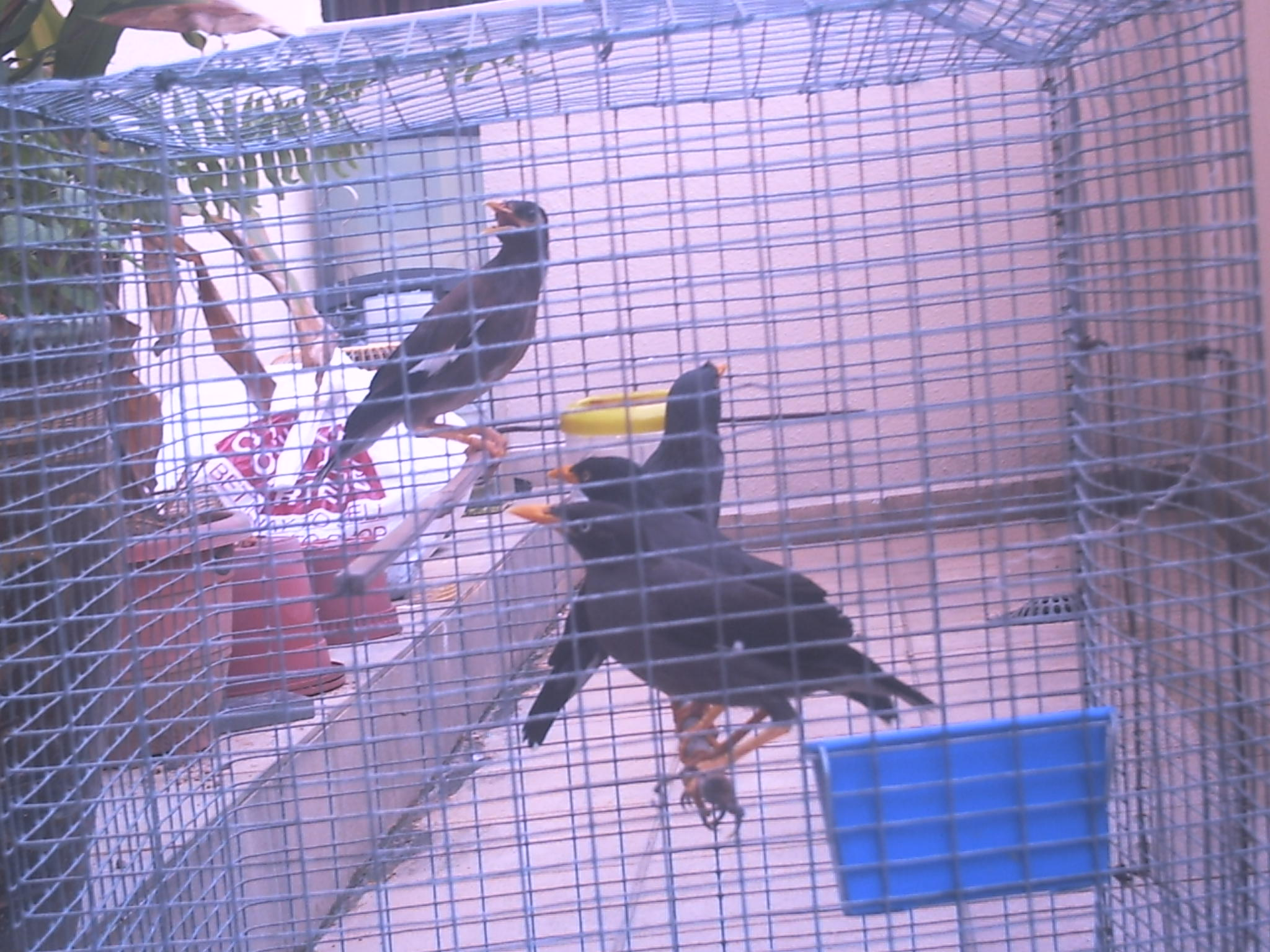
A captive housed with a Javan myna

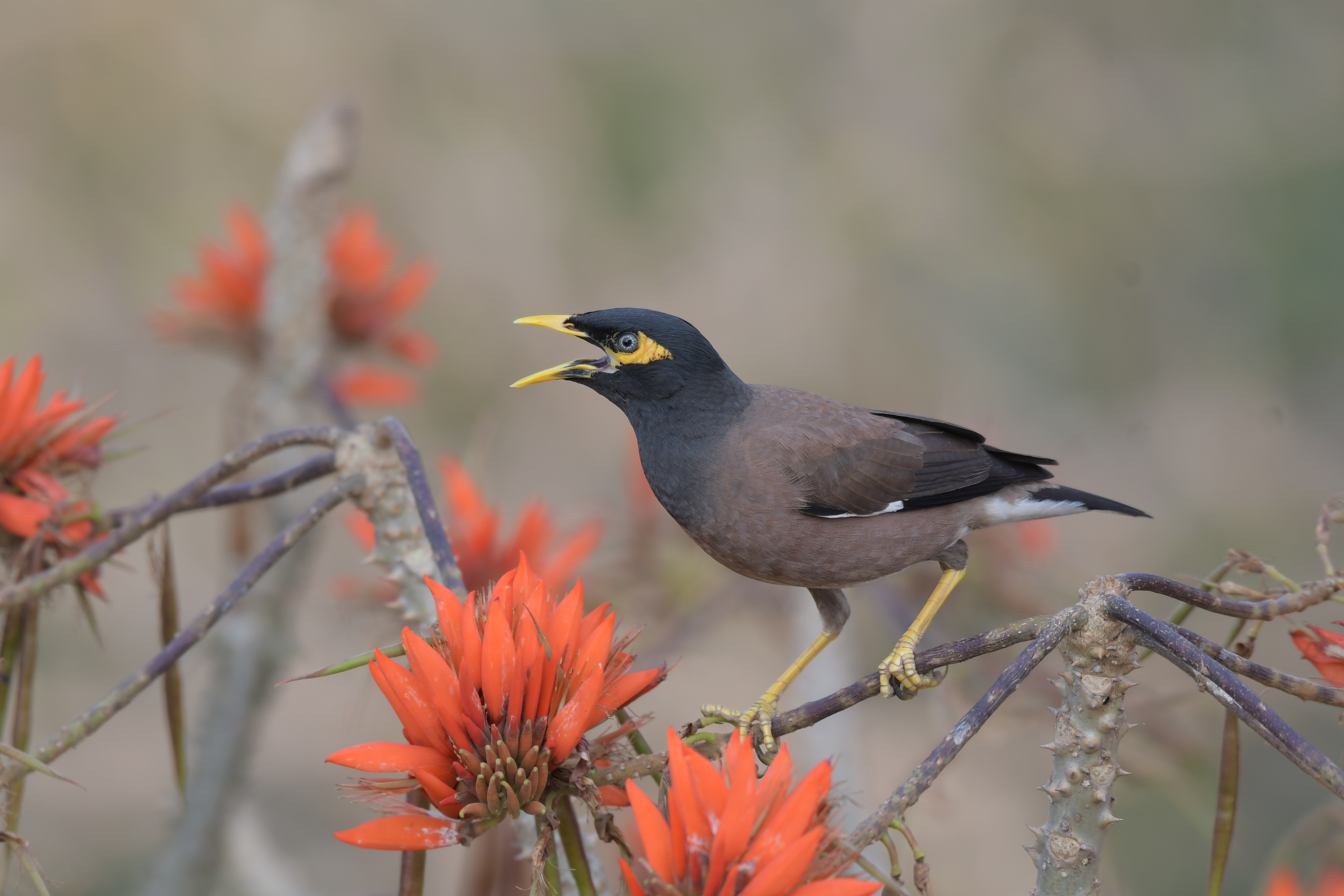
In Bangladesh

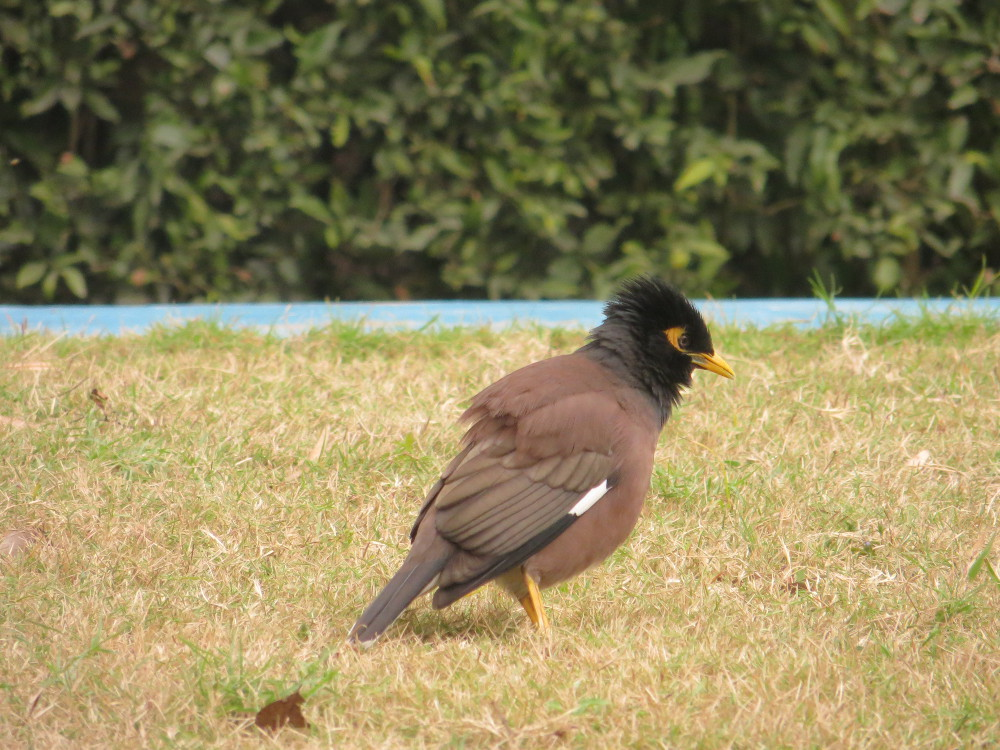
Basking

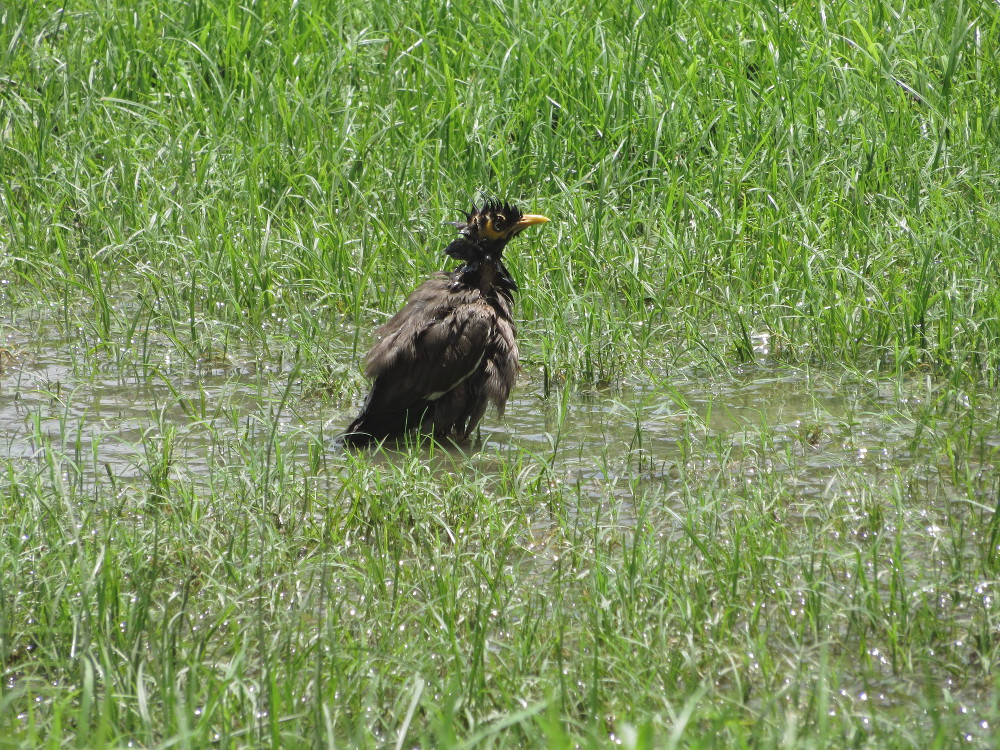
Bathing in a rain water puddle

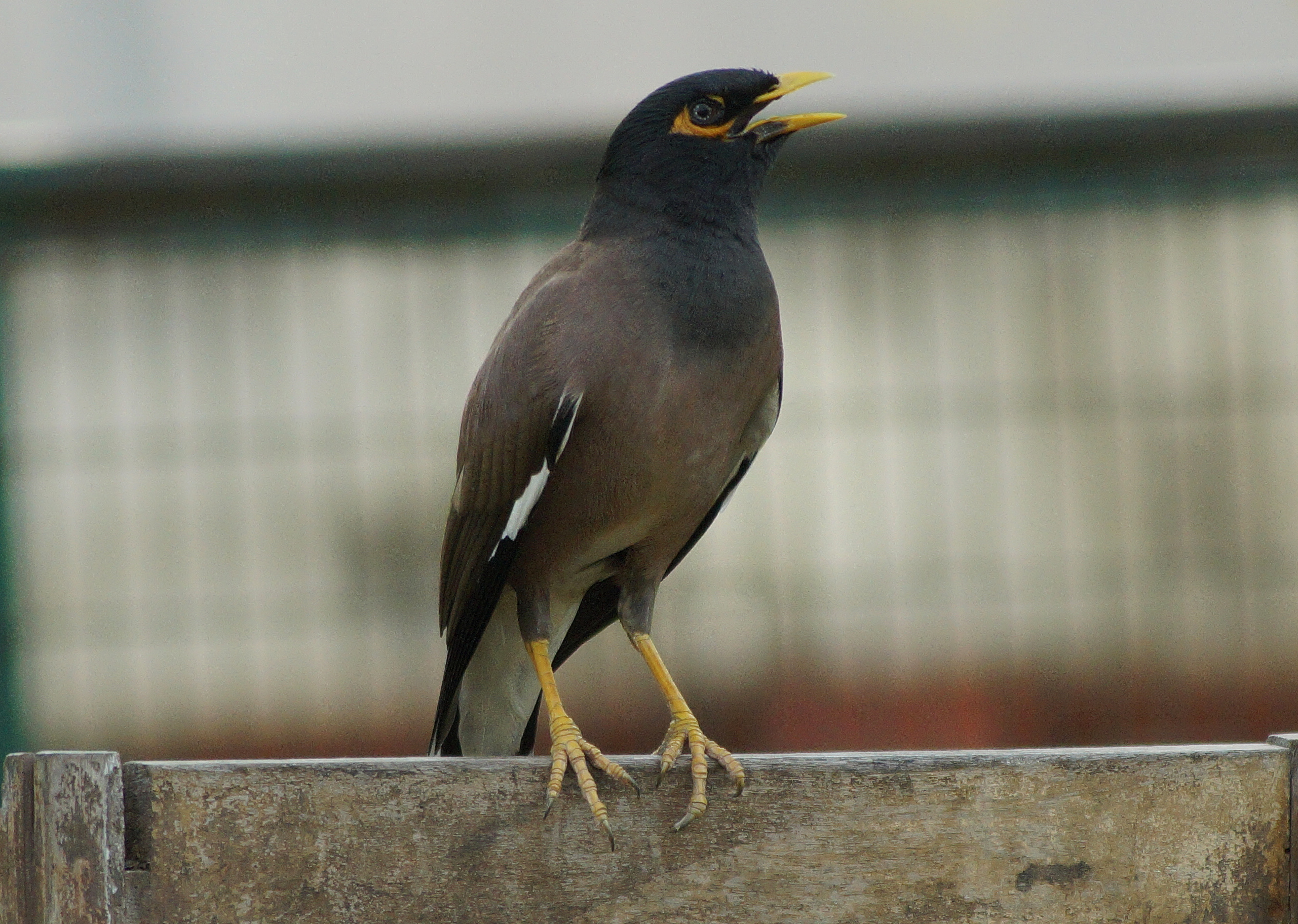
In Patiala

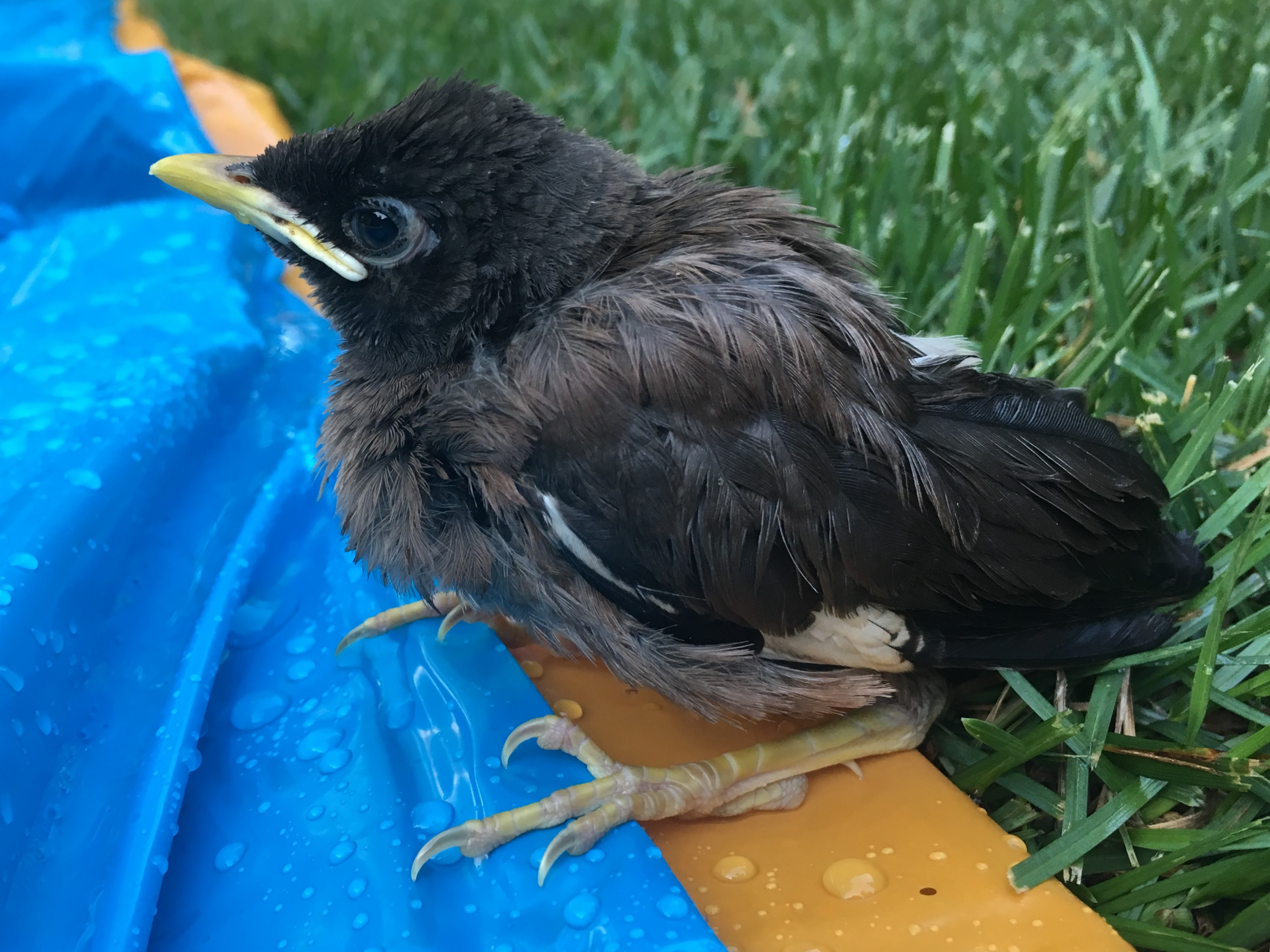
A juvenile bathing in Australia

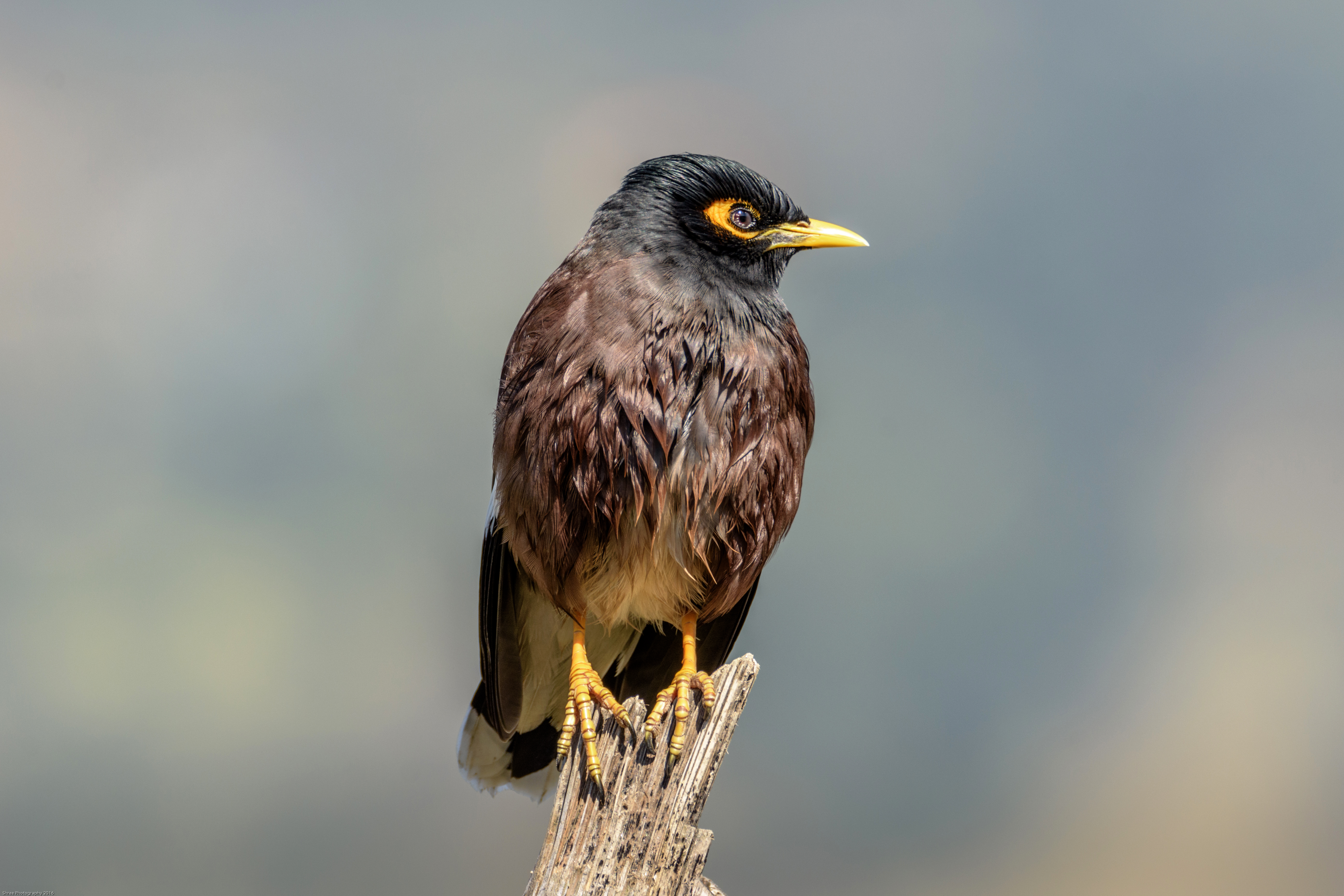
In Nepal

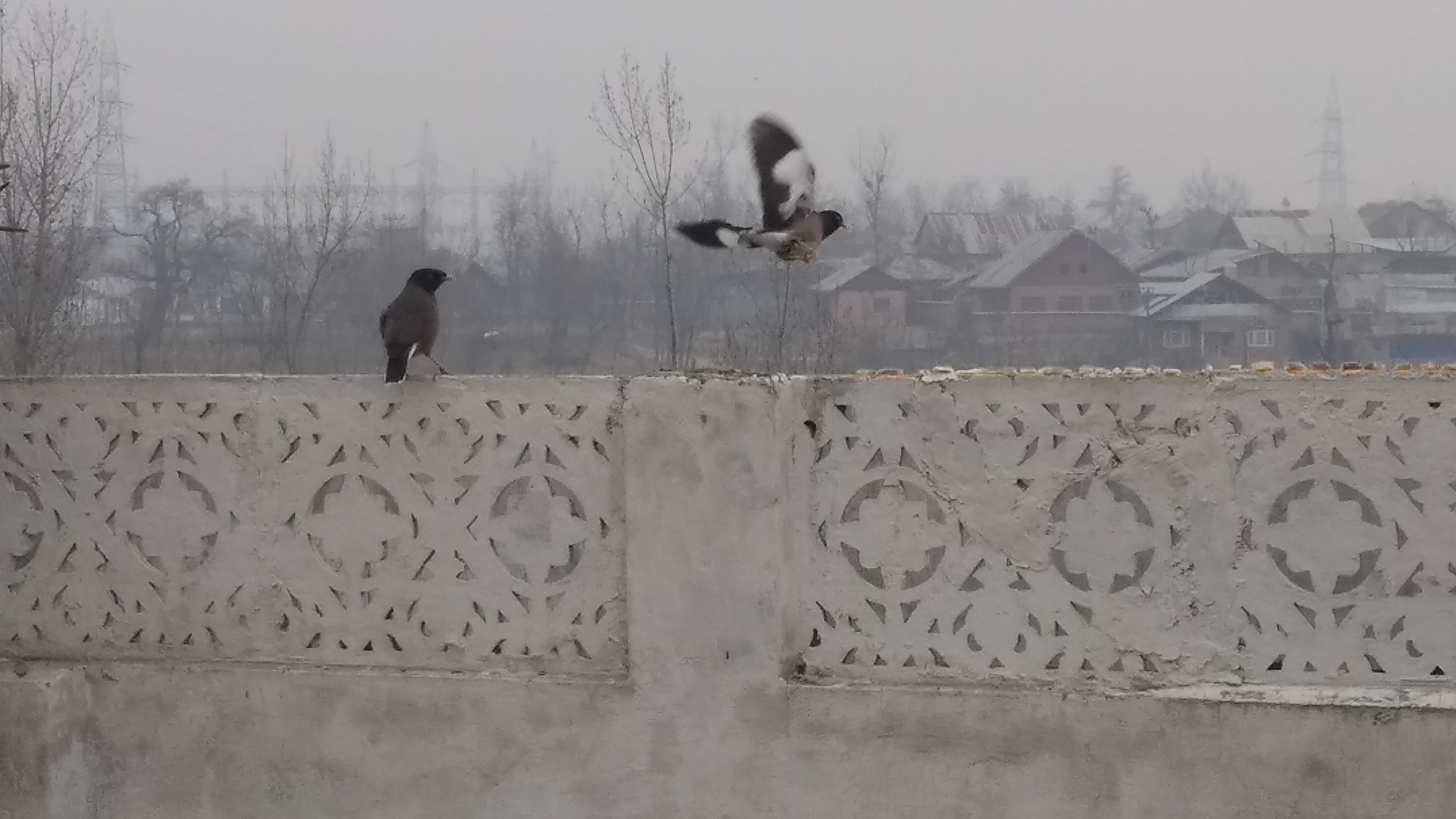
Two in Srinagar

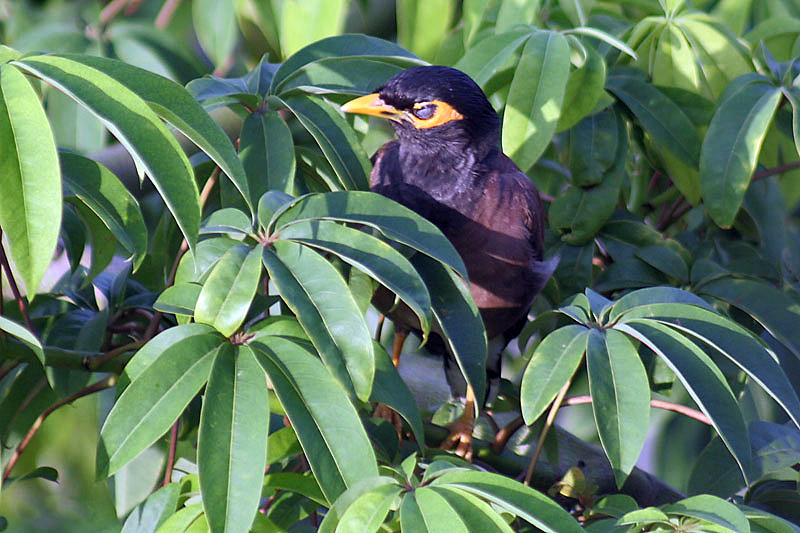
Perching among the foliage of a Kapok in Kolkata

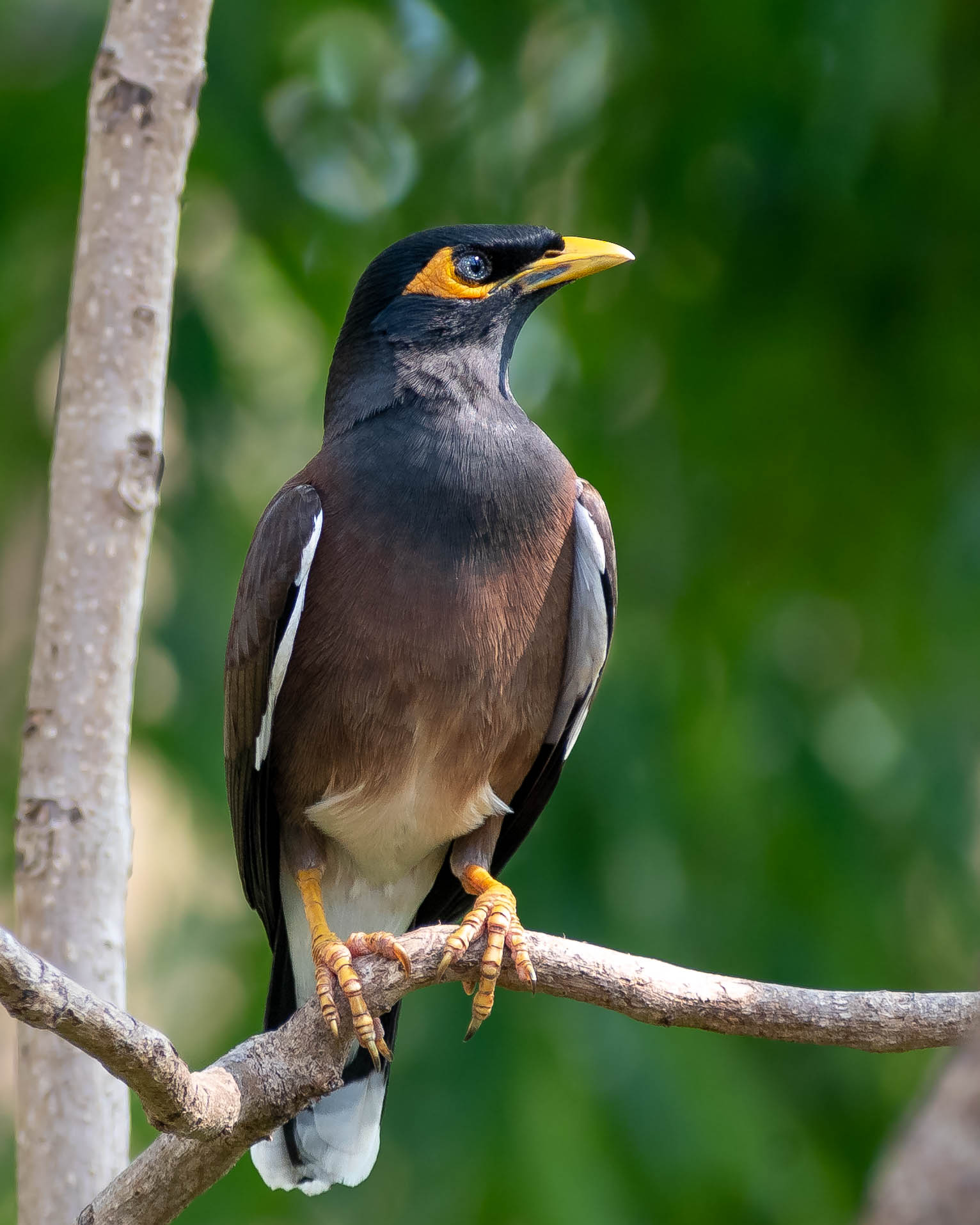
Mumbai, India
