= E. J. Scovell =

English poet and translator (1907–1999)

Edith Joy Scovell
- Born: April 9, 1907; Ecclesall Bierlow, near Sheffield, South Yorkshire, England
- Died: October 19, 1999 (aged 92); Oxford, England
- Education: Casterton School; Somerville College, Oxford
- Occupations: Poet, translator
- Spouse: Charles Sutherland Elton (m. 1937)
- Children: 1 daughter, 1 son
- Father: F. G. Scovell (Anglican rector)
- Writing career
- Pen name: E. J. Scovell
- Language: English
- Period: 20th century
- Works: Shadows of Chrysanthemums (1944); The Midsummer Meadow (1946); The River Steamer (1956); Collected Poems (1988); Selected Poems (1991)
- Notable awards: Cholmondeley Award (1989)

Edith Joy Scovell (9 April 1907 – 19 October 1999) was an English poet and translator. Among those who admired her work were the fellow-writers Vita Sackville-West and Philip Larkin.

== Life ==
Edith Joy Scovell was born in Ecclesall Bierlow, near Sheffield. Her father, F. G. Scovell, was Anglican rector of the village. Joy was one of eight children. She studied at Casterton School, Westmorland, and at Somerville College, Oxford, graduating in English literature.

Despite her background, Scovell ceased to be a religious believer: "I lost religion fairly early on," she told interviewer Jem Poster. "I mean religious faith – if indeed I ever had it."

After a period spent working as a secretary and journalist, Scovell married in 1937 the ecologist Charles Sutherland Elton, who had established the Bureau of Animal Population in Oxford. They had a daughter, Catherine Ingrid Buffonge MBE, in 1940 and a son, Robert Elton, in 1943. In general, Scovell remained reticent about private matters: "I have had a fairly ordinary life I think, with normal experiences." She died in Oxford in October 1999.

Scovell and her husband Charles Elton lived in Park Town, North Oxford. Their house includes a blue plaque, dedicated to both of them in 2024.

== Writings ==
E. J. Scovell published three volumes of poetry: Shadows of Chrysanthemums (1944), The Midsummer Meadow (1946), and The River Steamer (1956). Her Collected Poems (1988, Cholmondeley Award) and Selected Poems (1991) were published by Carcanet Press.

Geoffrey Grigson, an admirer of Scovell's work, included eight of her poems in his 1949 collection Poetry of the Present: An Anthology of the Thirties and After. He praised her observation, as "a poet less concerned with celebrity and self-importance than with being alive and in love.... The purest woman poet of our time." Philip Larkin included two, "The Swan's Feet" and "After Midsummer", in The Oxford Book of Twentieth Century English Verse (1973). Her poem "Child Waking" was included in the Penguin Book of Contemporary Verse (Harmondsworth, UK, 1950 and later editions). Her poem "Deaths of Flowers" is included, with reflective comment, in Janet Morley's collection The Heart's Time (SPCK 2011).

Another enthusiast was Vita Sackville-West, who "came across some verses of E. J. Scovell and was so much struck by them that I cut them out to stick in a private anthology."

Scovell's many poems about children include "An Early Death", inspired by a grandchild who died at the age of three: "To have stood in the doorway in your shift of grace/With hands half lifted, so to have looked in/On mortal life, it is not nothing – is/A hammer stroke that rings and rings."

Scovell translated some work by the late 19th-century Italian poet Giovanni Pascoli.

== Works ==
- Shadows of Chysanthemums (1944)
- The Midsummer Meadow (1946)
- The River Steamer (1956)
- The Space Between (including the Pascoli translations, 1982)
- Listening to Collared Doves (1986)
