= Eltonian niche =

Ecological niche

The Eltonian niche is an ecological niche that emphasizes the functional attributes of animals and their corresponding trophic position. This was the definition Eugene Odum popularized in his analogy of the niche of a species with its profession in the ecosystem as opposed to the habitat being its address. The definition is attributed to Charles Elton in his 1927 now classic book Animal Ecology. Elton used the two African rhinoceros species to exemplify the definition. The white rhinoceros has broad (wide, hence its name) mouthparts, which are efficient in harvesting grass, while the black rhinoceros has narrow pointed lips enabling it to feed selectively on the foliage of thorny bushes.
