= Charles Sutherland Elton =

English zoologist and ecologist (1900–1991)

Charles Sutherland Elton FRS
- Born: 29 March 1900; Manchester, England
- Died: 1 May 1991 (aged 91); Oxford, England
- Education: Oxford University
- Known for: Eltonian niche, food chain
- Spouses: Rosé Montague (1928) (divorced); Edith Joy Scovell (1937)
- Awards: Linnean Medal (1967); Tyler Prize for Environmental Achievement (1976); Darwin Medal (1970)
- Scientific career
- Fields: Animal ecology, zoology
- Workplaces: Oxford University
- Doctoral students: Dennis H. Chitty, Francis C. Evans, William W. Murdoch, Michael Smyth

Charles Sutherland Elton FRS (29 March 1900 – 1 May 1991) was an English zoologist and animal ecologist. He is associated with the development of population and community ecology, including studies of invasive organisms.

== Personal life ==
Charles Sutherland Elton was born in Manchester, a son of the literary scholar Oliver Elton and the children's writer Letitia Maynard Elton (née MacColl). He had an older brother, Geoffrey Elton, who died at 33, and to whom Charles Elton in many of his writings attributes his interest in scientific natural history. Charles Elton married the English poet Edith Joy Scovell in 1937, a first five-year marriage to Rose Montague having ended in amicable divorce. Charles and Joy had two children, Catherine Ingrid Buffonge MBE and Robert Elton.

== Professional life ==
Charles Elton was educated at Liverpool College and Oxford University, from which he graduated in zoology in 1922, with a first in his field research project and a third in the exams, and where he subsequently had his entire academic career. During his studies at Oxford he conceptualized his ideas about animal ecology, aiming to turn natural history into the science of ecology by applying scientific methods to studying the lives of animals in their natural habitats and interactions with the environment.

While still an undergraduate, Elton assisted Julian Huxley on the 1921 Oxford University Spitsbergen expedition, where he made an ecological survey of Arctic vertebrates. This he continued on three more Arctic expeditions in 1923, 1924 and 1930. He also spent some time on fieldwork in St. Kilda, Scotland. His Arctic experience led to a consultancy with the Hudson's Bay Company in 1926–1931, to study fluctuating populations of animal species of interest to the fur trade. He later made similar studies of British mouse and vole populations. He spent many years on field research in Wytham Woods, Oxford.

Elton's early career was influenced by Alexander Carr-Saunders, Victor Ernest Shelford and Gordon Hewitt. In 1922, Alexander Carr-Saunders wrote The Population Problem: A Study of Human Evolution, where he outlines how the influence of overpopulation in humans has cascading effects on plant and animal life around the world. Elton later applied these ideas of fluctuation to animals. Victor Ernest Shelford wrote Animal Communities in Temperate America in 1913, where he outlines three main principles of ecology: (1) emphasis on the importance of studying the physiology of the organism, rather than the physiology of a specific organ; (2) evaluation of the "phenomena of behaviour and physiology" in relation to the natural environments; and (3) relation of the ecology of plant life to that of animal life. In Gordon Hewitt's 1921 book The Conservation of the Wildlife of Canada, Elton noticed the Canadian lynx and snowshoe hare population cycles, and developed a greater understanding of population fluctuations in Arctic vertebrates with the Hudson's Bay Company.

In 1932, Elton established the Bureau of Animal Population at Oxford, which became a centre for collecting data on fluctuations in animal populations. In the same year, the Journal of Animal Ecology was founded, with Elton as its first editor. In 1936, he was appointed reader in animal ecology at Oxford University, and Corpus Christi College elected him a senior research fellow. During the Second World War, the Bureau of Animal Population was entrusted by the Agricultural Research Council to find efficient methods for controlling rats, mice and rabbits. After the Second World War, Elton started a 20-year survey of animals and their interrelationships on Oxford University's Wytham estate, covering those in meadows, woods and water. After his retirement, he did some studies in tropical America.

Elton's great interest in nature conservation and problems in the management of nature reserves led him to be instrumental in establishing the Nature Conservancy Council in 1949. He was elected Fellow of the Royal Society in 1953 and received the society's Darwin Medal in 1970.

== Intellectual heritage ==
In 1927, Elton published his classic Animal Ecology, outlining the principles behind ecological studies of animal behaviour and life history, such as food chains, size of food items, ecological niche, and the concept of a pyramid of numbers to represent the structure of an ecosystem in terms of feeding relationships. There he also introduced ideas such as the food cycle, the connection between various parts of the ecosystem, and the concept of a food pyramid and trophic levels. He also discussed how ecosystems are organized and ordered, in what later became the foundation of the ecosystem concept. Elton was the first to discuss the ecological significance of population cycles. He also described how predators had an influence on prey, and so on, generating cycles.

In later works on niche theory, Elton's definition – the Eltonian niche – in terms of functional attributes of organisms (or their position in the trophic web), has been viewed by some authors as opposed to Joseph Grinnell's earlier definition emphasising states of the environment suitable for the species. Others have argued there are more similarities than differences between the two versions of the niche concept.

After the Second World War, Elton became much more concerned with the impact of invasive species on natural ecosystems. His 1958 book The Ecology of Invasions by Animals and Plants founded invasion ecology as a separate sub-discipline. This book became the basis of the study of biological invasions. It was the first of its kind to warn about the harmful effects and damage invasive species can have on an ecosystem. The first part of the book focuses on the invader species and their mode of transport into the new environment. The second part of the book focuses on the struggle between invasive species and the indigenous, though some invaders enter habitats with no prior species filling their specific niche. The final part of The Ecology of Invasions by Animals and Plants deals with the issue of conservation and its importance to maintain species diversity.

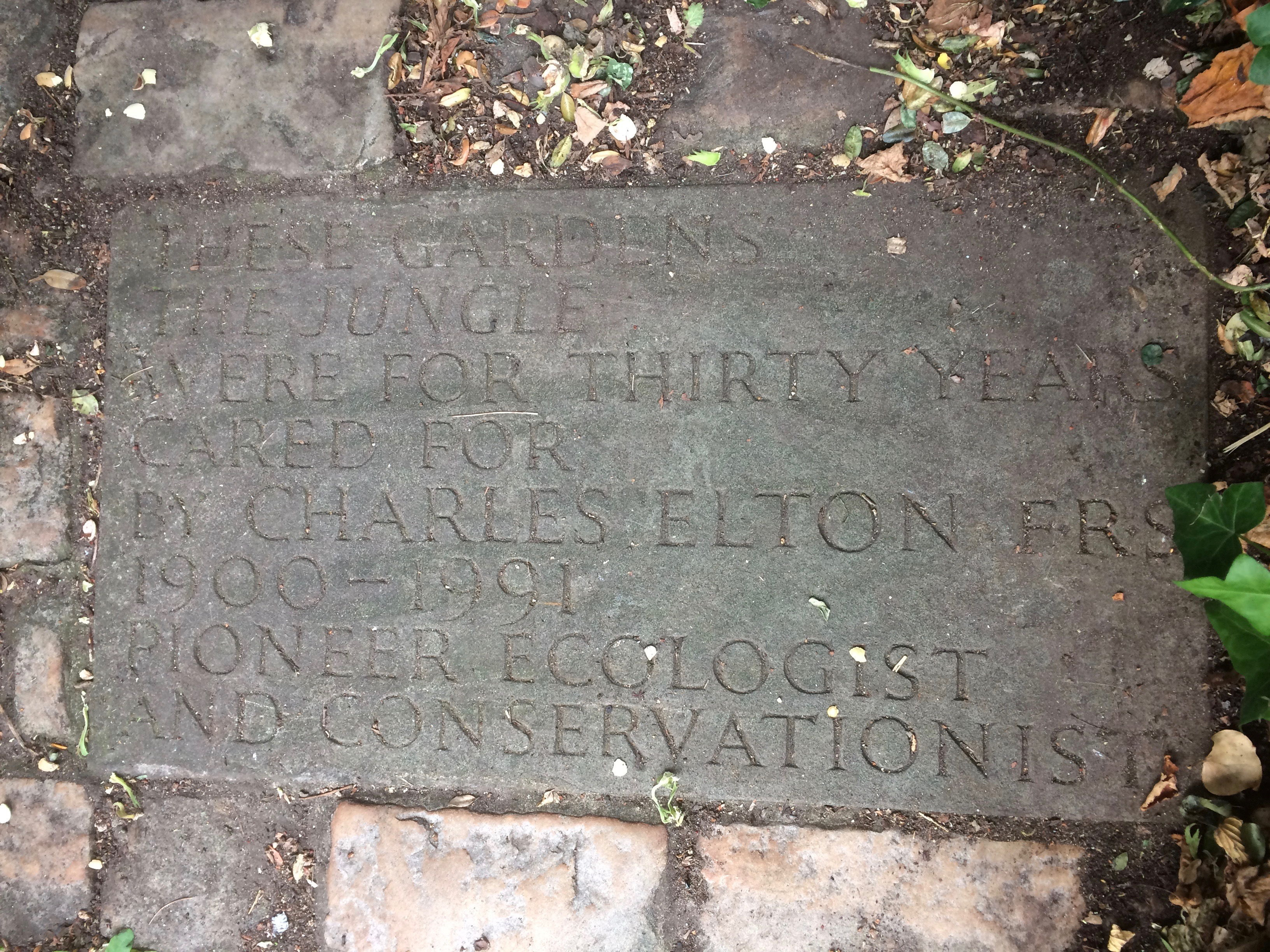
Memorial stone in Park Town, Oxford

Elton lived in Park Town, North Oxford, where he tended some of the communal gardens, as recorded in a memorial stone set in the ground there. His house also includes a blue plaque, dedicated to him and his wife, Edith Scovell (1907–1999), a poet.

== Bibliography ==
- Animal Ecology, 1st ed., 1927, Sidgwick and Jackson, London. Reprinted several times, e.g. 2001, The University of Chicago Press, ISBN 0-226-20639-4. 2nd ed., The Ecology of Animals, 1946, London: Methuen
- Voles, Mice and Lemmings: Problems in population dynamics 1st ed., 1942. Oxford: Clarendon Press. Facsimile reprint, 1969, New York: Wheldon & Wesley Ltd. ISBN 9780854860081
- The Ecology of Invasions by Animals and Plants, 1958, London: Methuen. Reprint, 2000, The University of Chicago Press. ISBN 0-226-20638-6
- The Pattern of Animal Communities, 1st ed., 1966, London: Methuen. 2nd ed., 1979, London: Chapman & Hall ISBN 0-412-21880-1
