= Lee R. Dice =

American ecologist and geneticist (1887–1977)

- Born: Lee Raymond Dice; July 15, 1887; Savannah, Georgia
- Died: January 31, 1977 (aged 89); Ann Arbor, Michigan
- Education: Stanford University; University of California, Berkeley
- Spouse: Doris S. Lemon (m. 1918–1977)
- Children: Betty, John, and Dorothy
- Awards: Eminent Ecologist Award from the Ecological Society of America (1964)
- Scientific career
- Fields: Ecology; Genetics
- Institutions: University of Montana; U.S. Biological Survey; University of Michigan
- Thesis: Distribution of the land vertebrates of southeastern Washington (1915)
- Doctoral advisor: Joseph Grinnell
- Other academic advisors: Samuel Jackson Holmes
- Notable students: Philip J. Clark

Lee Raymond Dice (July 15, 1887 – January 31, 1977) was an American ecologist and geneticist who taught at the University of Michigan for almost his entire career. He is known for independently developing the Sørensen–Dice coefficient.

== Education and career ==
Dice was born in Savannah, Georgia and studied briefly at Washington State College and University of Chicago before moving to Stanford University. He earned his A.B. from Stanford University in 1911, followed by an M.S. and Ph.D. from the University of California, Berkeley in 1914 and 1915, respectively. For his M.S. project, Dice worked on the movements of water fleas under Samuel Jackson Holmes. During his Ph.D., he worked under Joseph Grinnell on vertebrates in the Washington state. After graduation, Dice took on the role of an instructor in zoology at Kansas State Agricultural College (now Kansas State University) from 1916 to 1917 and later served as an assistant professor of zoology at the University of Montana from 1917 to 1918. Between 1918 and 1919, Dice worked at the U.S. Biological Survey and the Michigan Biological and Geological Survey as a field assistant. He began teaching at the University of Michigan in 1919 as an assistant professor and became a professor in 1942. He taught at the University of Michigan until 1957, during which time he founded the University's heredity clinic and served as director of its Institute of Human Biology.

== Honors and awards ==
Dice served as vice-president of the American Society of Mammalogists from 1947 to 1951 and the vice-president of the Society for the Study of Evolution between 1947 and 1948 and between 1953 and 1954. In 1948, Dice became the president of the Ecologists Union, later known as the Nature Conservancy. He served as president of the Ecological Society of America from 1952 to 1953 and received its Eminent Ecologist Award in 1964. In 1957, the University of Michigan honored him by creating the Lee R. Dice Distinguished Professorship.
