= Hugh MacIsaac =

Canadian ecologist

Academic background
- Education: BSc, Biology, University of Windsor; MSc, Botany, University of Toronto; Ph.D., Biology, 1990, Dartmouth College
- Thesis: Determinants of competitive outcome between rotifers and cladocerans (1990)

Hugh Joseph MacIsaac is a Canadian ecologist. He is a Tier 1 Canada Research Chair in Aquatic Invasive Species at the University of Windsor and a professor at the Great Lakes Institute for Environmental Research.

== Early life and education ==
MacIsaac completed his Bachelor of Science degree in biology from the University of Windsor (UWindsor) before enrolling at the University of Toronto for his Master of Science in botany. He then completed his formal education by earning his PhD in the United States at Dartmouth College.

== Career ==
Following his PhD, MacIsaac accepted a Natural Sciences and Engineering Research Council (NSERC) Postdoctoral Fellowship in the Zoology Department at his alma mater, the University of Toronto. In 1992, MacIsaac joined the Department of Biological Sciences at UWindsor. While also working with the Great Lakes Institute for Environmental Research (GLIER) in 1999, MacIsaac focused his research on how human beings were affecting the environment. He published a paper suggesting that the introduction of non-indigenous species to Lake Ontario were a direct result of human behaviour. By 2011, MacIsaac was serving as the director of the NSERC Canadian Aquatic Invasive Species Network II and leading a nation-wide study of invasive species along the Canadian coasts.

MacIsaac later broadened his research to include countries such as Japan and China. In 2013, MacIsaac expanded his role with the NSERC by playing an integral role in determining how Canada and Japan could better protect their water resources from pollutants such as pharmaceuticals and personal care products. Following this, MacIsaac was appointed a Tier 1 Canada Research Chair in Aquatic Invasive Species to fund his research into studying invasive species from a molecular perspective. Although his research continued, the Canadian Aquatic Invasive Species Network closed down in 2016 due to a lack of funding.

In 2019, MacIsaac continued his international collaboration by engaging in an environmental exchange program with Chinese university students. The program brought eight Chinese students to Windsor for the two-week course while UWindsor students travelled to Yunnan. In 2021, MacIsaac refocused his invasive species research onto quagga mussel and zebra mussels populations. His Canada Research Chair position was renewed to fund his study into understanding these species at their molecular level.

== Personal life ==
MacIsaac is married to Jaimie M. Loaring.
