= Philip J. Clark =

American ecologist (1920-1964)

- Born: January 28, 1920; Takoma Park, Maryland
- Died: December 24, 1964 (aged 44); East Lansing, Michigan
- Education: University of Chicago; University of Michigan
- Spouse: Deborah
- Children: 3 daughters
- Scientific career
- Fields: Biometrics; Ecology; Human genetics Zoology
- Institutions: University of Oklahoma; Michigan State University
- Thesis: Relative viability of albino and normal paradise fish, Macropodus opercularis, when exposed in the laboratory to various mortality-producing agents (1953)
- Doctoral advisor: Lee R. Dice

Philip Jason Clark (January 28, 1920 – December 24, 1964) was an American ecologist and zoologist. He taught at the University of Oklahoma and at Michigan State University. His expertise made serious contributions to human genetics, physical anthropology and community ecology. Those contributions are most reflected in journals such as Ecology, Science, Human Biology, Eugenics Quarterly, American Journal of Physical Anthropology, Animal Behavior and American Journal of Human Genetics. He died on December 24, 1964, when he was hit by a pickup truck while walking home from his office at Michigan State University.

== Life and work ==
Philip Clark was born on January 28, 1920, in Takoma Park, Maryland. He spent most of his childhood growing up in Chicago near Lake Michigan. Clark attended the University of Chicago and graduated in 1948 after serving a year and half in the U.S. Navy. Under the supervision of Dr. Lee R. Dice, Clark underwent his graduate studies. His efforts paid off and was award a M.S. degree in 1950 and a Ph.D. degree in 1953. Still at the University of Chicago, Clark went to the Institute of Human Biology till 1955 and work as a Junior Biologist. Soon after, he got a Postdoctoral Fellowship in Statistics. A year later, he started teaching at the University of Oklahoma. In 1957, Clark transferred to Michigan State University and joined their faculty. The department of Zoology recognized his talents and research and was soon promoted to a professor after 4 years. The National Science Foundation granted Clark to hold a Science Faculty Fellowship at the University of North Carolina and taught in the department of Biostatistics. He returned to Michigan State University due to a year's sabbatical leave.
