= Škoda Rapid (2012) =

Škoda Rapid (NH1/2/3)
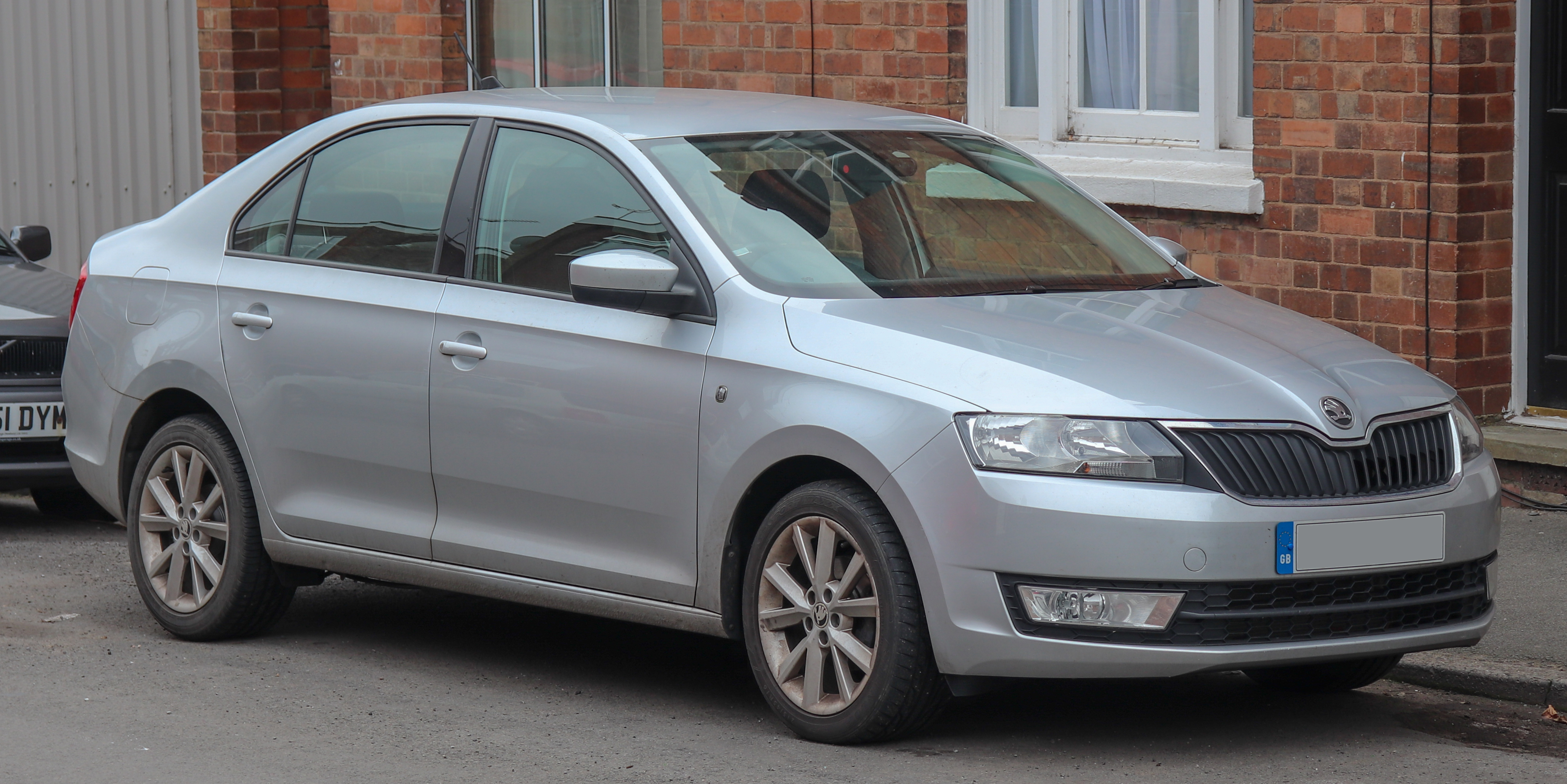

Overview
- Manufacturer: Škoda Auto
- Also called: Volkswagen Polo (Russia, 2020–2022)
- Production: 2012–2019 (Czech Republic); 2012–2022 (Russia); 2012–2023 (China)
- Assembly: Czech Republic: Mladá Boleslav; China: Yizheng (SAIC-VW); Russia: Kaluga (VW Group Rus); Ukraine: Solomonovo (Eurocar); Kazakhstan: Ust-Kamenogorsk; Algeria: Relizane

Body and chassis
- Class: Small family car
- Body style: 4-door sedan (China); 5-door liftback 5-door hatchback
- Layout: Front-engine, front-wheel-drive
- Platform: Volkswagen Group A05+ (PQ25) platform
- Related: SEAT Toledo Mk4; Volkswagen Santana (2013); Volkswagen Jetta (2013); Jetta VA3

Powertrain
- Engine: Petrol: 1.0 L TSI I3; 1.2 L MPI I3; 1.2 L TSI I4; 1.4 L TSI I4; 1.6 L MPI I4; Diesel: 1.4 L TDI I3; 1.6 L TDI I4
- Transmission: 5-speed manual 6-speed manual 6-speed automatic 7-speed DCT

Dimensions
- Wheelbase: 2,602 mm (102.4 in)
- Length: 4,483 mm (176.5 in) (liftback); 4,304 mm (169.4 in) (hatchback); 4,512 mm (177.6 in) (sedan)
- Width: 1,706 mm (67.2 in)
- Height: 1,461 mm (57.5 in) (liftback); 1,459 mm (57.4 in) (hatchback); 1,469 mm (57.8 in) (sedan)
- Kerb weight: 1,100–1,292 kg (2,425–2,848 lb)

Chronology
- Successor: Škoda Octavia (liftback); Škoda Scala (hatchback)

The Škoda Rapid (NH) is range of small family car models produced by the Czech manufacturer Škoda Auto. It consists of three body styles: a five-door liftback, a five-door hatchback marketed as "Spaceback" and a four-door sedan sold in China. The model is based on a B-segment-focused PQ25 platform. Another vehicle with the Rapid nameplate was also introduced in India in 2011, which is a rebadged and restyled Volkswagen Vento/Polo sedan.

The liftback in its production form was first shown to the public in September 2012, when it was officially shown at the Paris Motor Show. Sales started in Czech Republic from 20 October 2012, and commenced at the end of 2012 in other parts of central and western Europe, with sales and production in Russia starting at the beginning of 2014.

The hatchback marketed as the Rapid Spaceback premiered at the Frankfurt Motor Show in 2013, with production starting subsequently. Since 2019, the successor to the Rapid in Western and Central Europe is the Škoda Scala, with the Rapid being given a facelift for the Chinese, but also for Russian market in 2020 due to its continuing popularity.

The "Rapid" name was previously used in the 1930s for the Škoda Rapid (1935–47) and in the 1980s for the rear engine Škoda Garde/Rapid coupé.

== 5-door liftback (NH3) ==
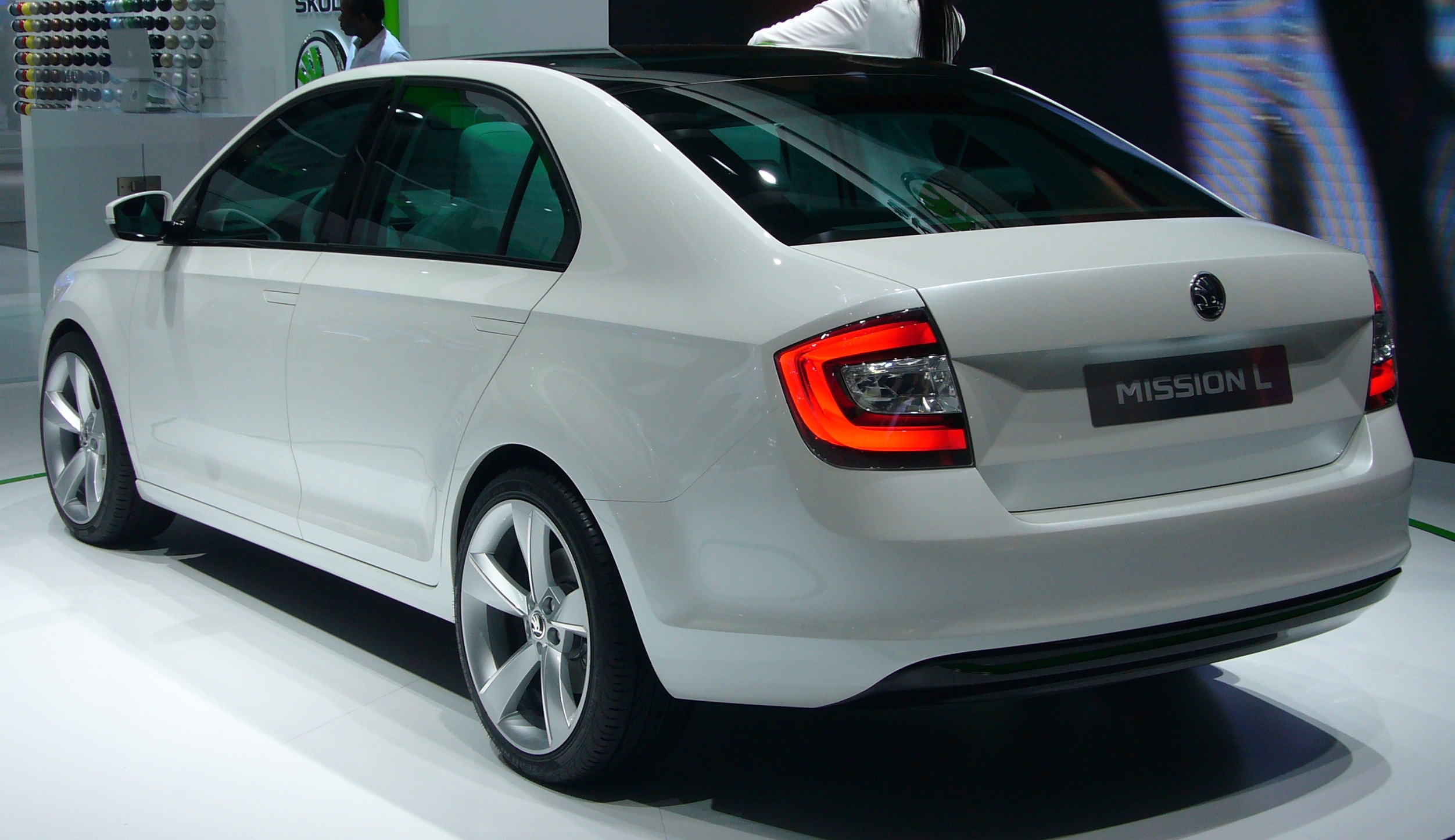
Škoda Mission L (Concept)

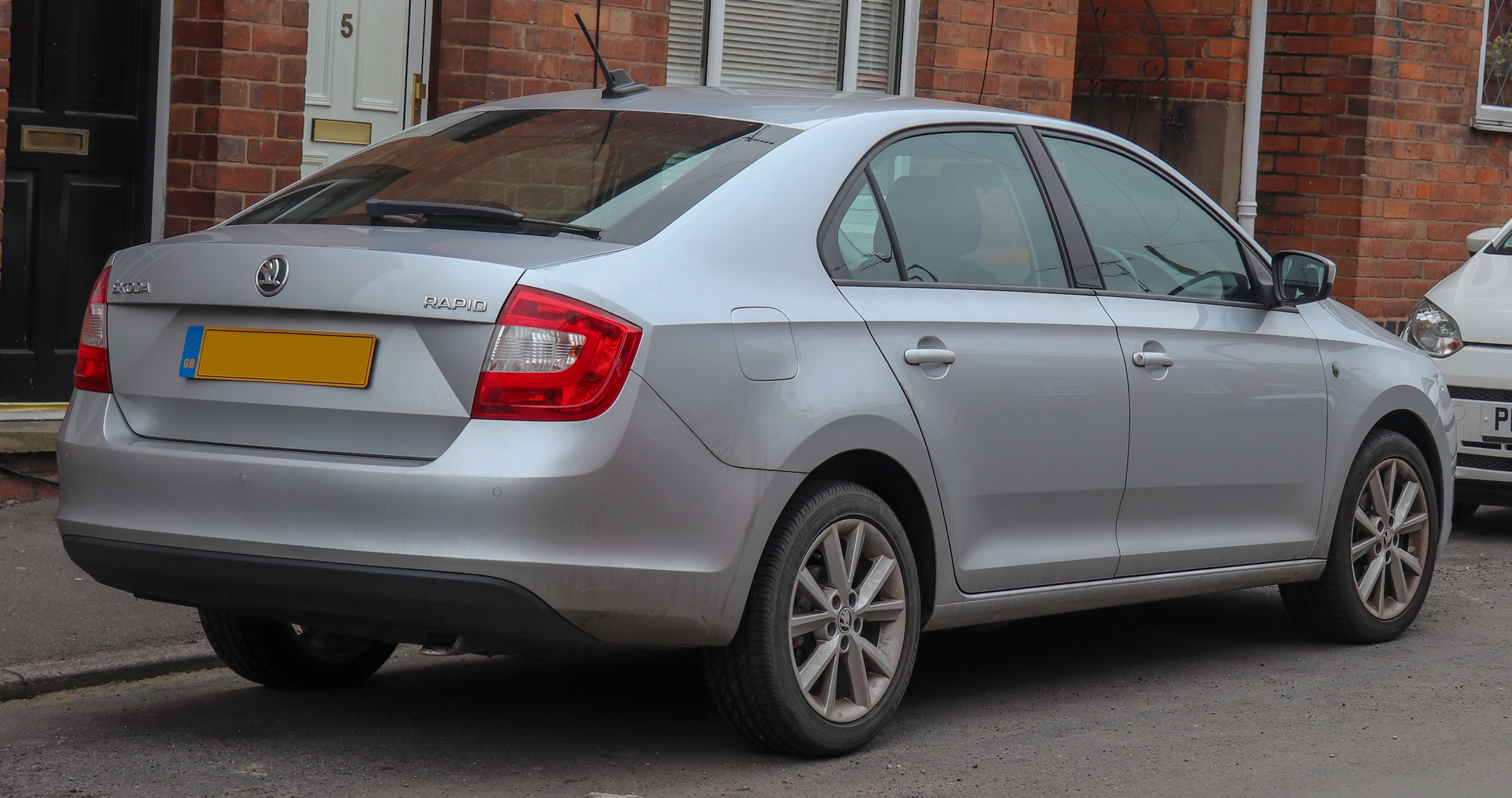
Liftback rear view (pre-facelift)

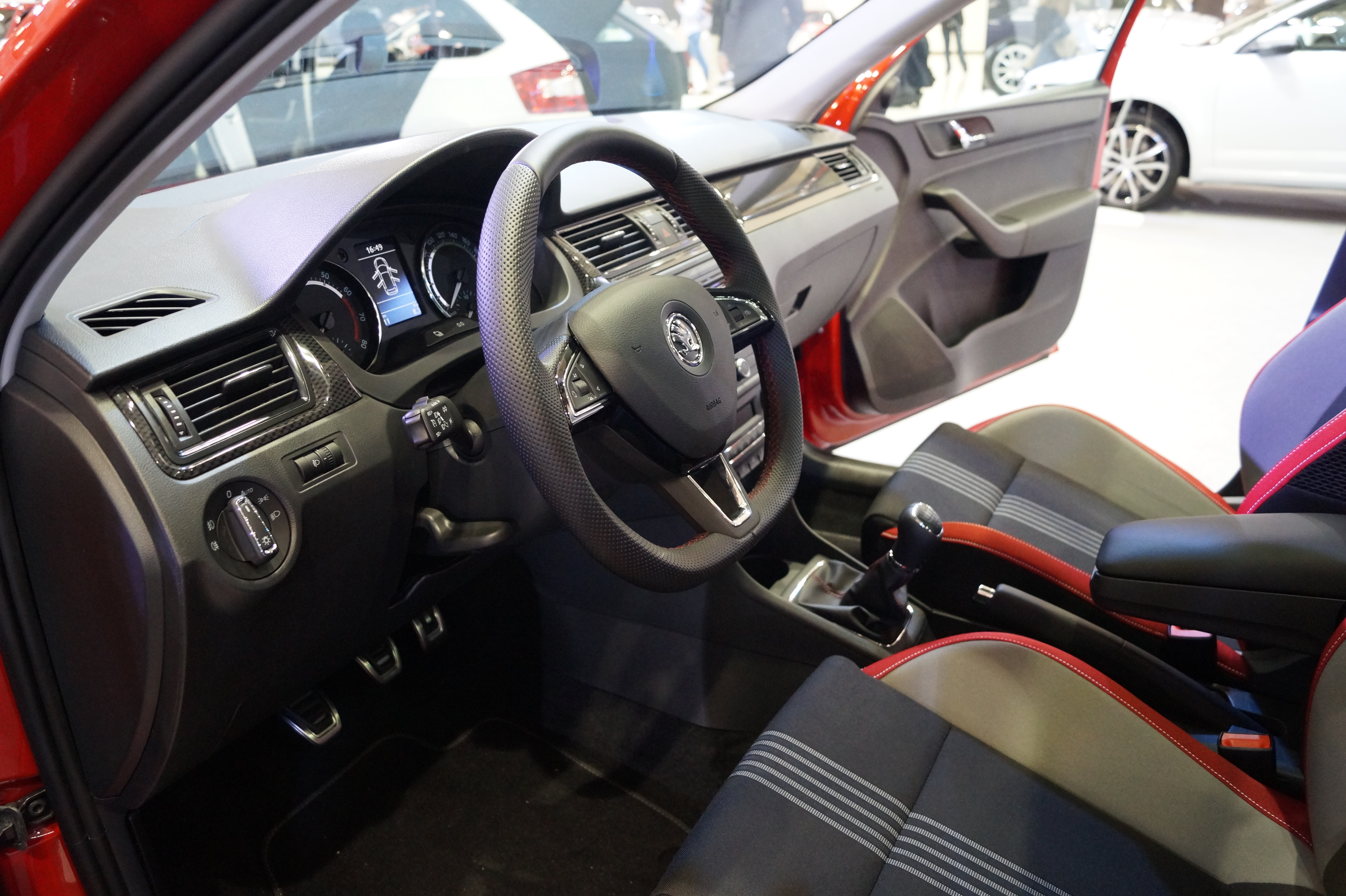
Interior view

The Rapid liftback (Typ NH3) was the first Škoda model to fully feature brand's new design language. Its minimalistic appearance, developed by Škoda chief designer Jozef Kabaň, was first featured by the Skoda MissionL concept car which was showcased at the 2011 Frankfurt Motor Show. The car was intended to fit between the Fabia and the third generation Octavia, where Škoda had a gap after the Octavia Tour had been discontinued in 2011.

Its overall dimensions were quite similar to the Octavia Tour, but the Rapid offered more space for rear passengers due to its longer wheelbase (2,602 mm vs 2,578 mm). Despite increasing interior space while reducing outer dimensions, the boot shrunk only by 35 litres (550 L vs 585 L). Payload remained the same as in the Octavia Tour (535 kg, including driver).

The Rapid line-up features three petrol engines and one diesel with various power outputs, all compliant to Euro 5 standards. Several of the petrol units have also been Euro 6 compliant since 2015. All engines are four-cylinder, except the base 1.2 petrol which is a three-cylinder unit. Seven-speed DSG is standard for the top of the range 1.4 litre TSI petrol engine, and optional for the 1.6 litre diesel with 66 KW.

Trim levels are Active, Ambition and Elegance in most markets, or S, SE and Elegance in the United Kingdom. The GreenLine model with CO_{2} emissions of 99 g/km was available since 2013. All models sold within the Europe are equipped with ESC and six airbags (front and side for driver and passenger, curtain airbags).

At the 32nd GTI Treffen (2013), Škoda presented the Rapid Sport with bi-colour body and 19-inch alloy wheels.

=== Facelifts ===
Rapid was facelifted in 2017. It received modified front fascia and new headlights, which can be equipped with bi-xenon headlamps with LED lights. Assistance systems were added and the cabin received a slightly modified dashboard. The basic motor instead of 1.2 MPI (55 kW) is now the 1.0 TSI (70 kW), while the 1.2 TSI engine was completely removed.

The liftback Rapid was facelifted for the second time in late 2019 for Russian and CIS markets, bringing significant styling and equipment updates. The 2020 Skoda Rapid gains a new face with triangular LED headlights that are similar to the Scala hatchback, a redesigned bumper with a sportier design, and the brand's hexagonal corporate grille.

At the rear, it featured the L-shaped LED taillights. Also new are the subtle deck lid spoiler, the refreshed bumper, and the "Skoda" lettering on the tailgate. The interior overhaul featured a very similar layout with the Scala and gaining several new features, which include a digital instrument panel, the latest infotainment system featuring a 6.5-inch "floating" touchscreen display (optionally available as an 8-inch unit), two USB-C outlets on the center console, and heated steering wheel.

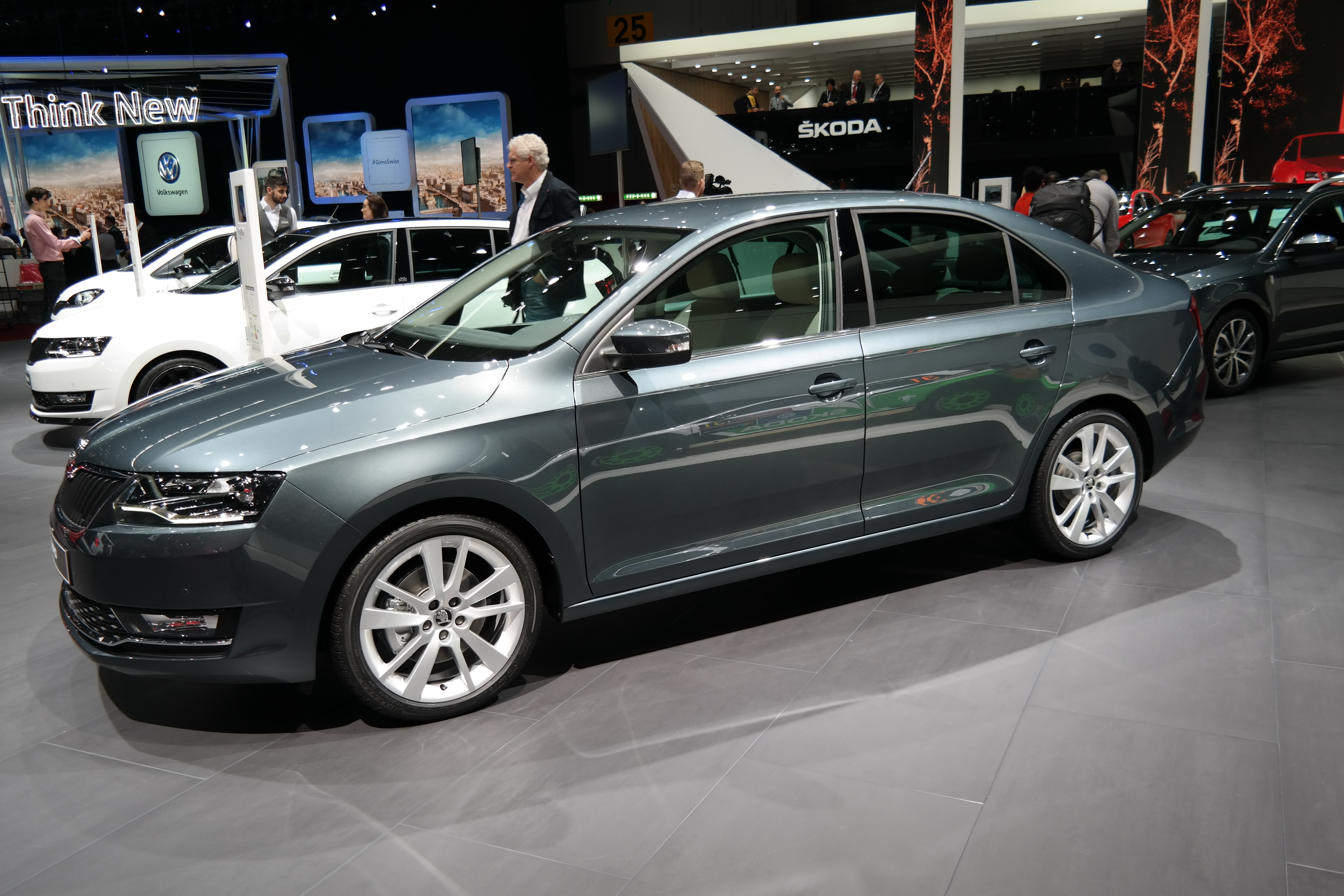
Škoda Rapid (2017 facelift)

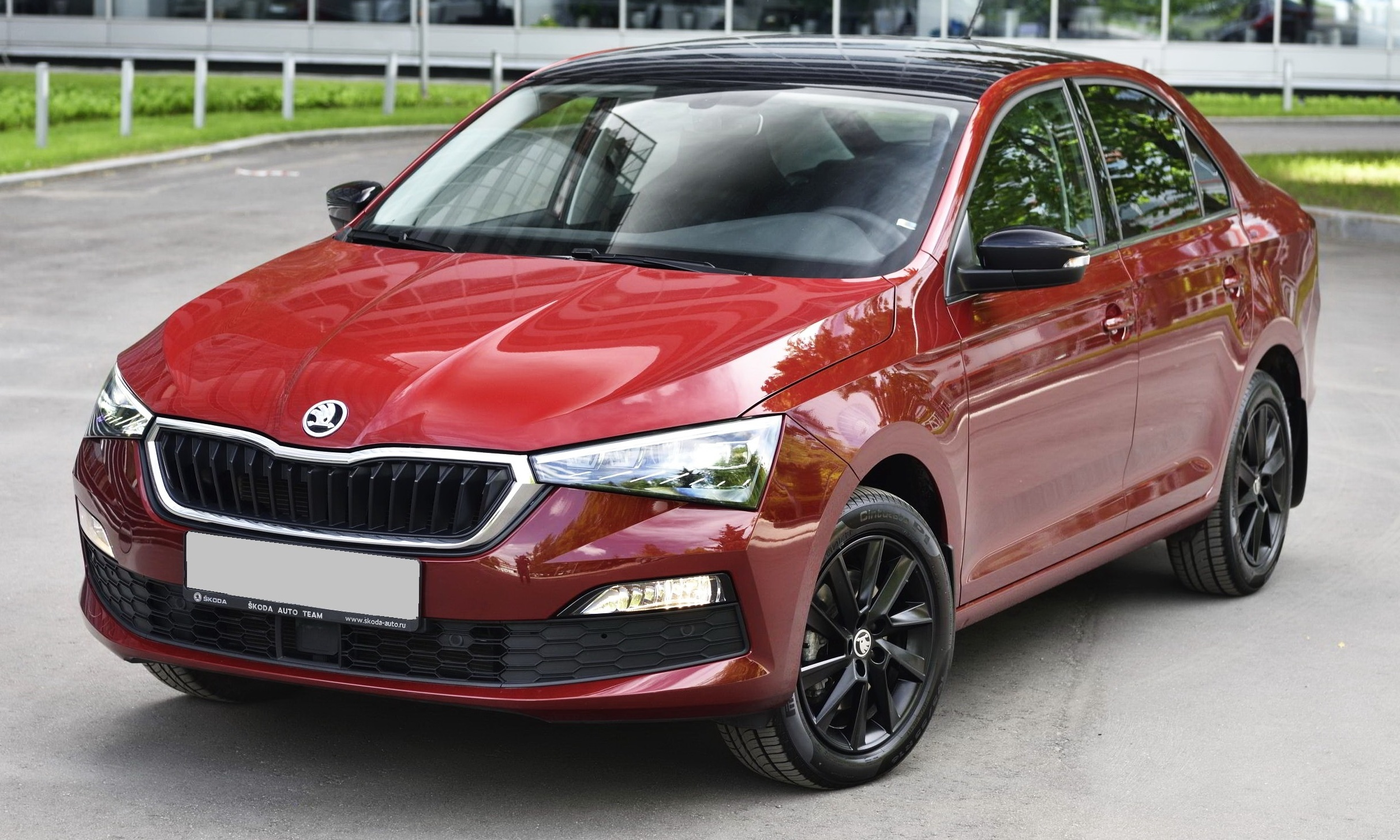
Škoda Rapid (2020 facelift, Russia)

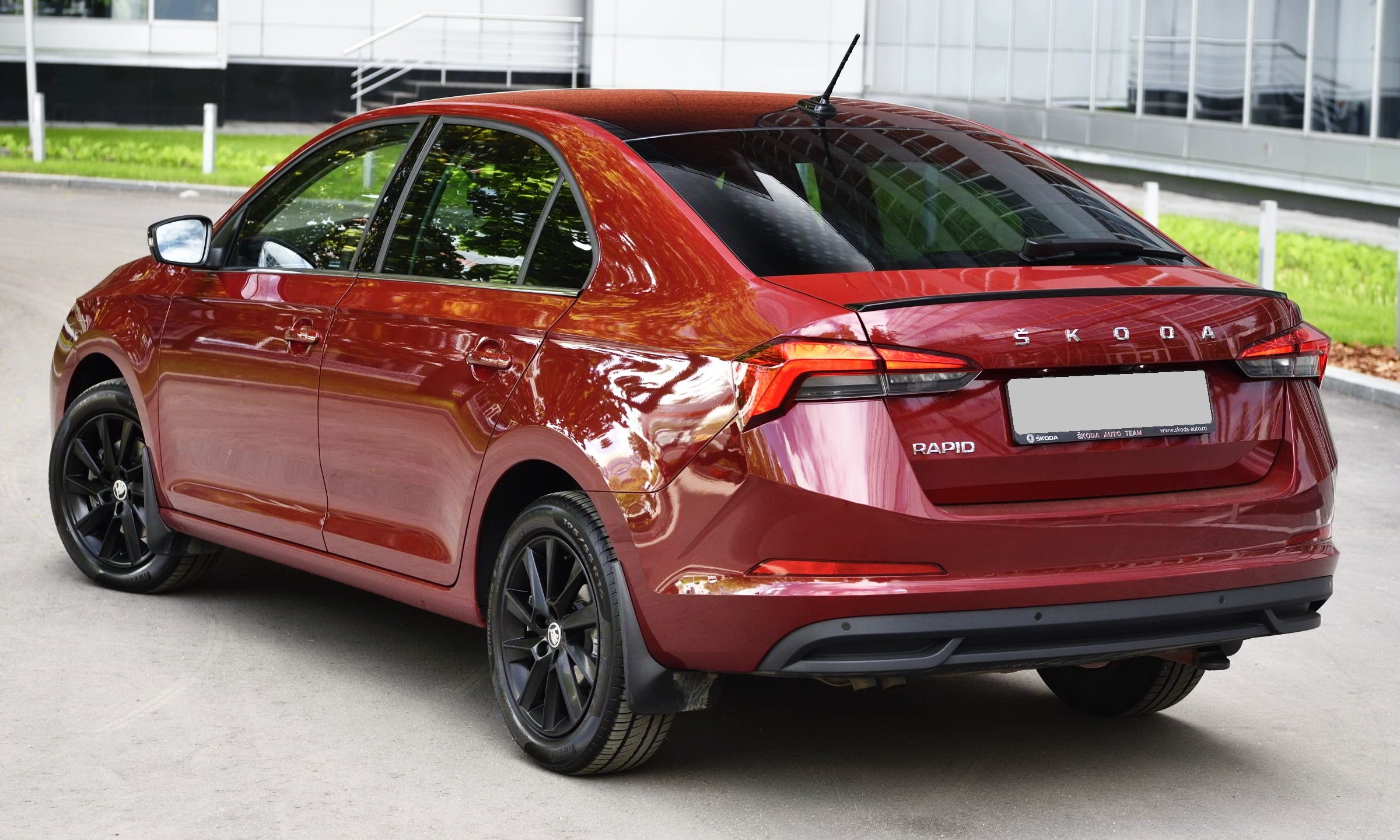
Škoda Rapid (2020 facelift, Russia)

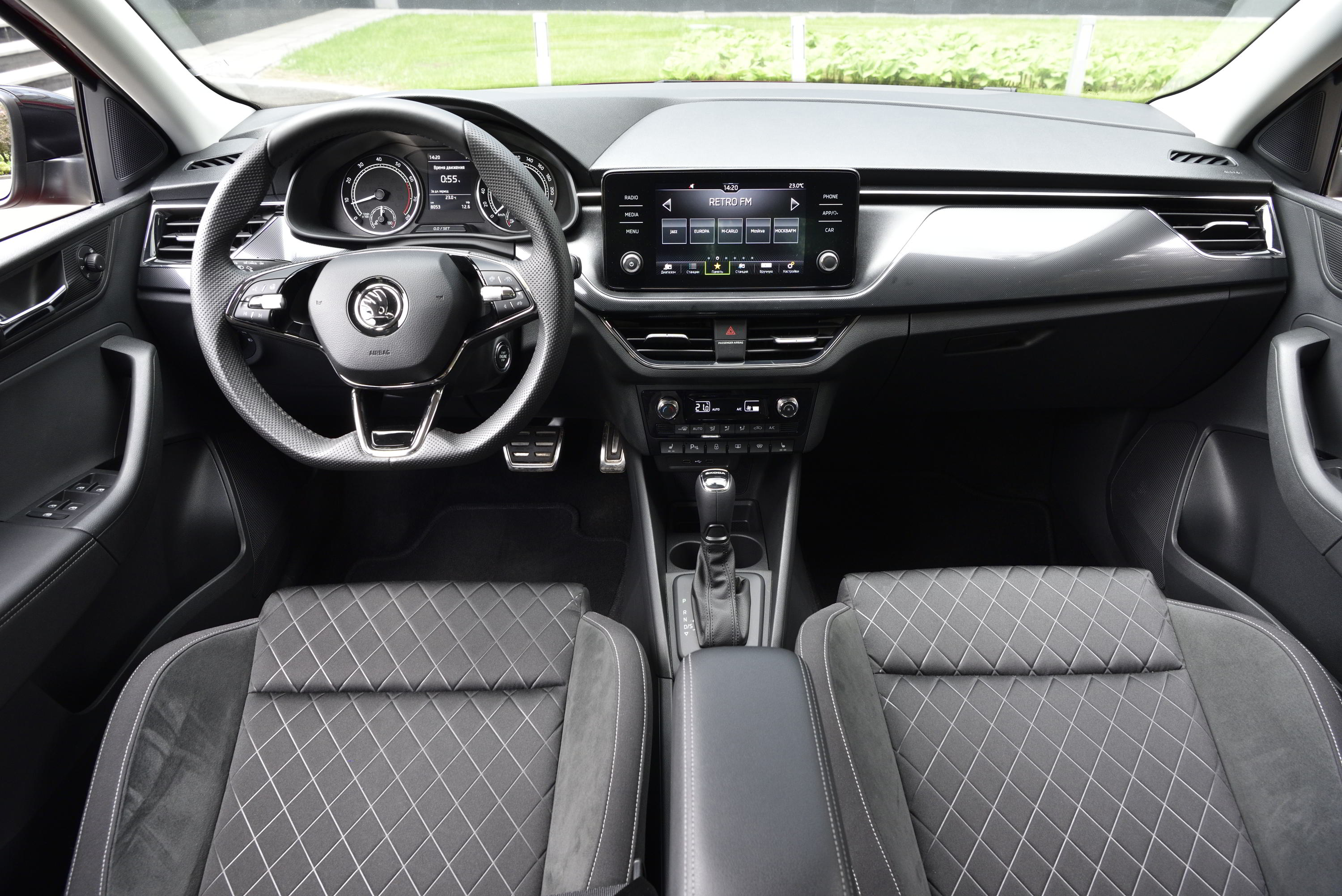
Interior (2020 facelift, Russia)

== Five-door hatchback (Rapid Spaceback; NH1) ==
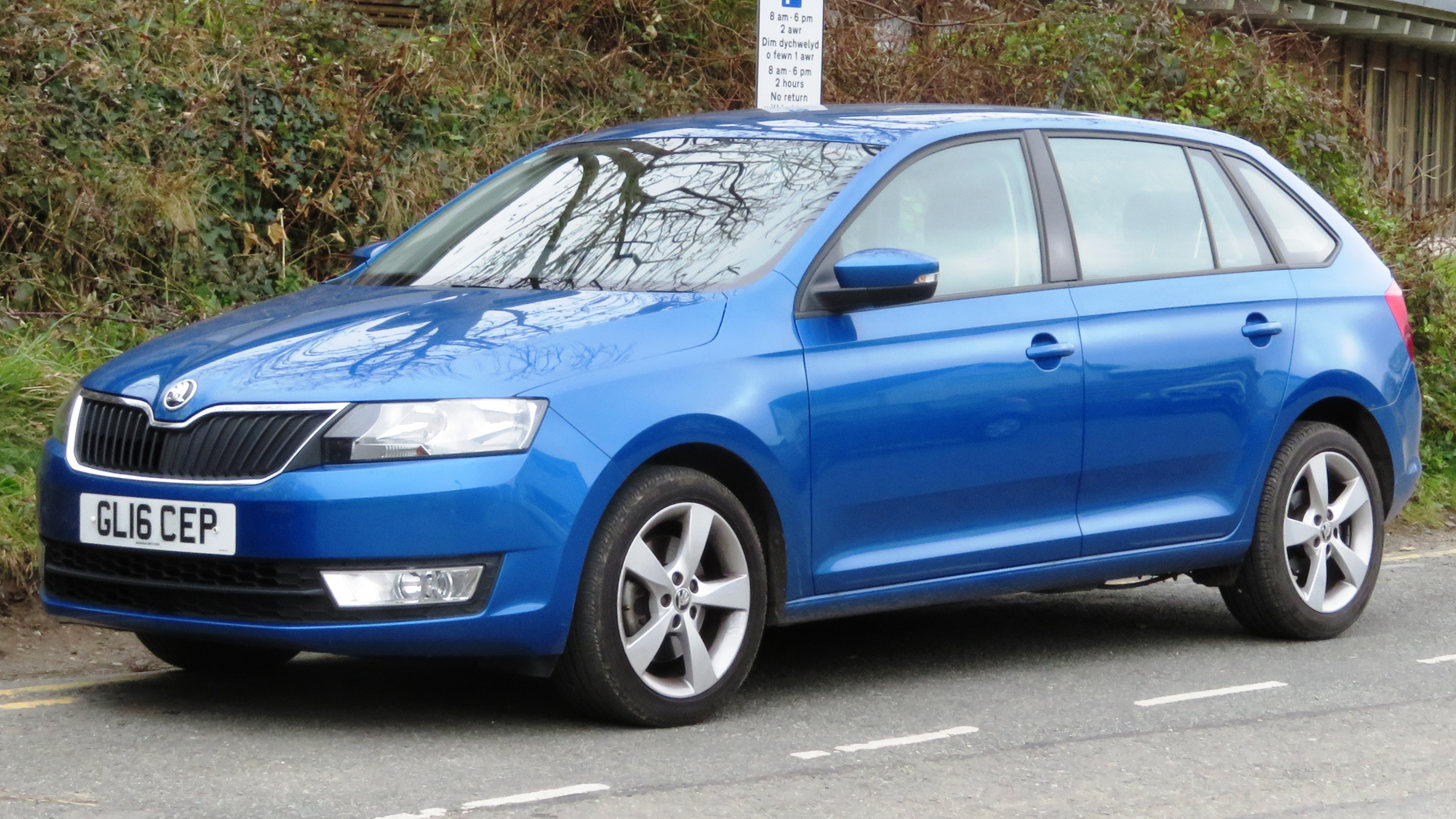

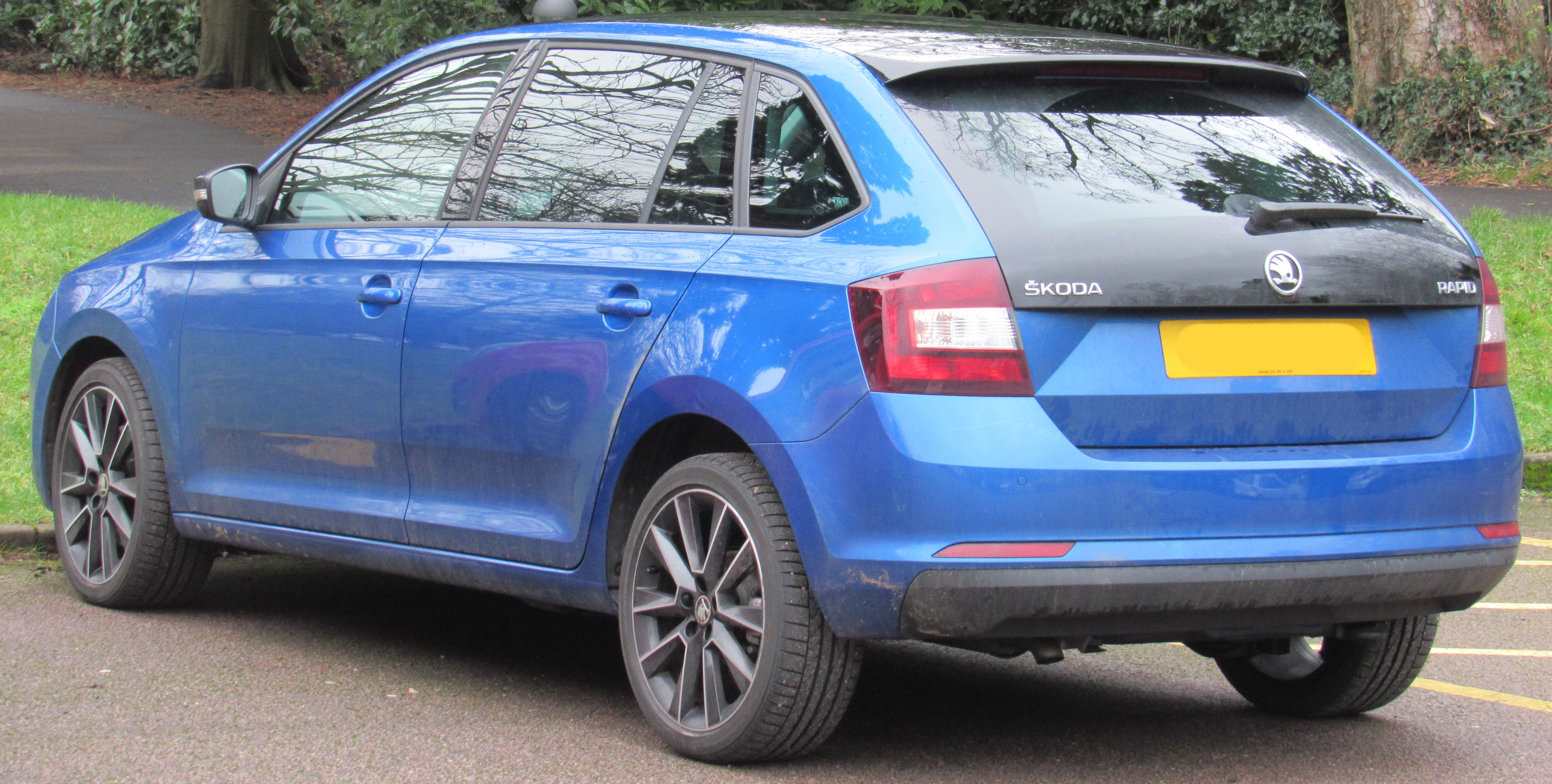
Spaceback (pre-facelift)

The original Rapid liftback was followed by a hatchback called Rapid Spaceback (Typ NH1) in September 2013 (both exhibition premiere and market launch). The Spaceback shares the wheelbase and front panels of the liftback, and uses a station wagon body, but with a shortened rear overhang and a correspondingly shortened rear section, following the formula pioneered in the 1970s, by Opel/Vauxhall, with their Opel Kadett City/Vauxhall Chevette. Despite the "sporty" fastback shape of the rear, luggage capacity is rated at between 415 and 1380 litres, according to whether or how the rear seat is folded.

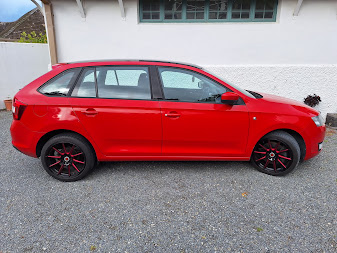
The model exported to New Zealand, assembled in the Czech Republic

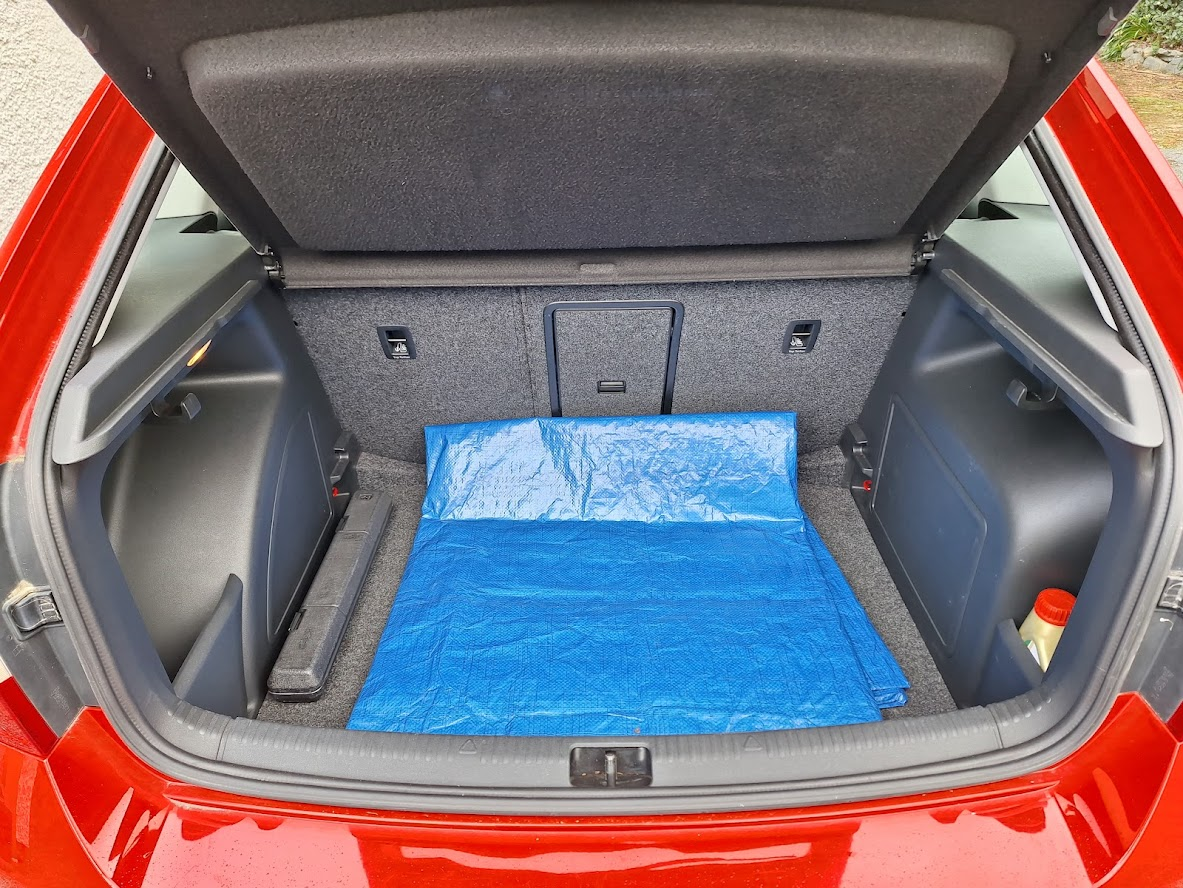
The boot area

A range of four petrol/gasoline, and two diesel engines offering maximum power outputs ranging from 75–122 PS (55–90 kW; 74–120 hp) is the same as in the Rapid.

The same counts for the equipment. With launch of the Spaceback, the European Rapid models were given optional low-power dipped beam xenon headlights. Due to the high intensity of xenon lamps, by law, if xenon headlights are fitted, headlight washers and dynamic headlight range adjustment must also be used.

Both measures are aimed at maintaining the light beam at a constant volume and angle relative to the road surface in order to avoid dazzling other road users. The luminous flux of xenon headlights in the Rapid models is 2,000 lumens, so there is no need to install a headlight washer system or dynamic range adjustment.

The most common 1.4 TSI engine itself – CAXA Variant – is reliable, however, it can be prone to carbon buildup on the intake valves, since these never come into contact with fuel on direct injection engines. The best way to mitigate this issue is by using good quality fuel – minimum 95 RON – and regular oil changes. However, the most expensive failure is the wastegate bushing on the stock Mitsubishi turbocharger. The only surefire way to detect it is by driving while running an OBD diagnostic: overboosting or underboosting will be visible depending on the position where the wastegate flap is stuck at, the symptom being low speed pre-ignition – LSPI – audible at low RPMs under load, which occurs even with 100 RON fuel since the ECU cannot adjust the timing and stochiometric ratio adequately.

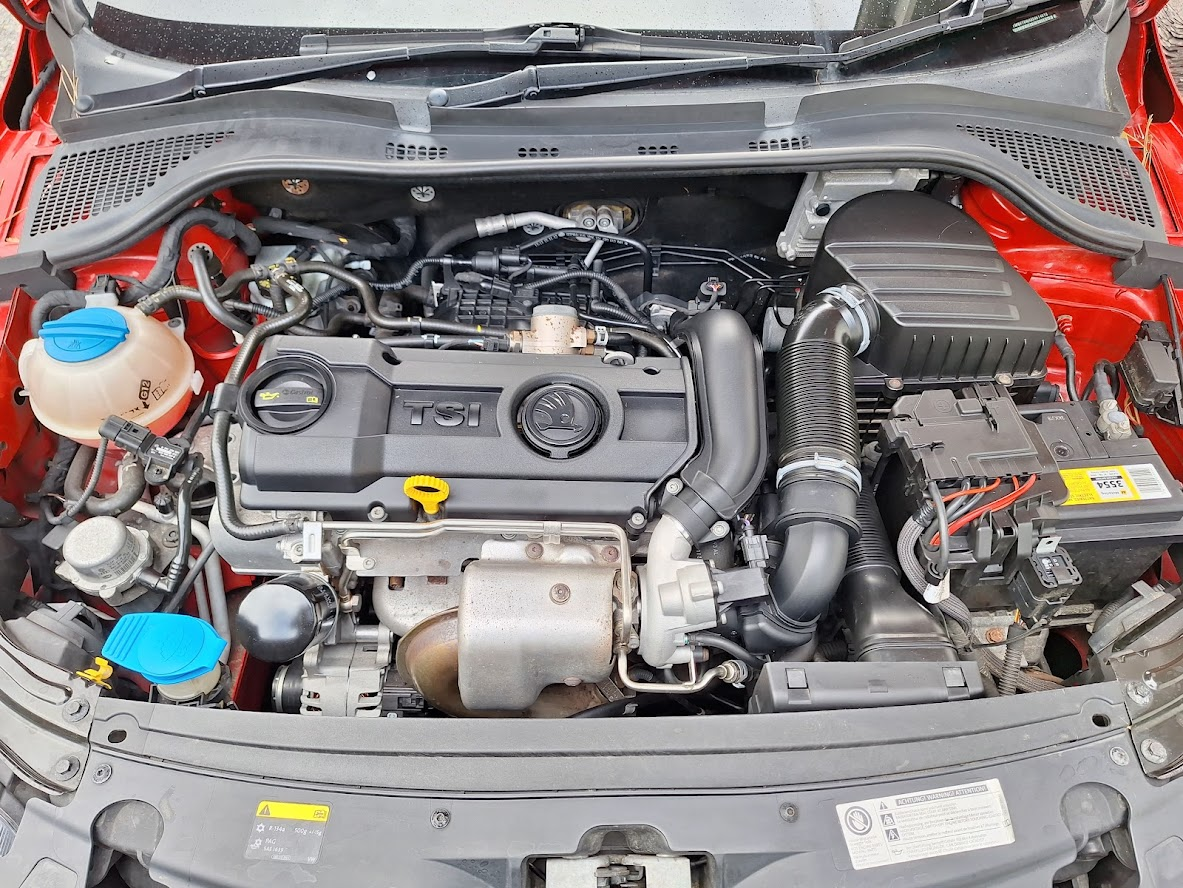
The 1.4 TSI engine bay – CAXA Variant

The Rapid Spaceback comes with a lockable fuel cap included in the central locking system. This means there is no need to unlock the fuel cap with car keys, the ice scraper is protected from theft and can be removed only after the car has been unlocked. This change was announced to arrive to the Rapid liftback as well. The list of features available to the Rapid Spaceback includes an optional false boot floor added, which reduces the height difference between the loading sill and the boot floor, and eliminates the step created when the rear seat backs are folded down. There is hidden storage space of up to 135 mm under the false boot floor. The interiors may feel somewhat rugged compared to other vehicles from the VAG group. However, they focus mostly on versatility, and are ideal for pragmatic owners.

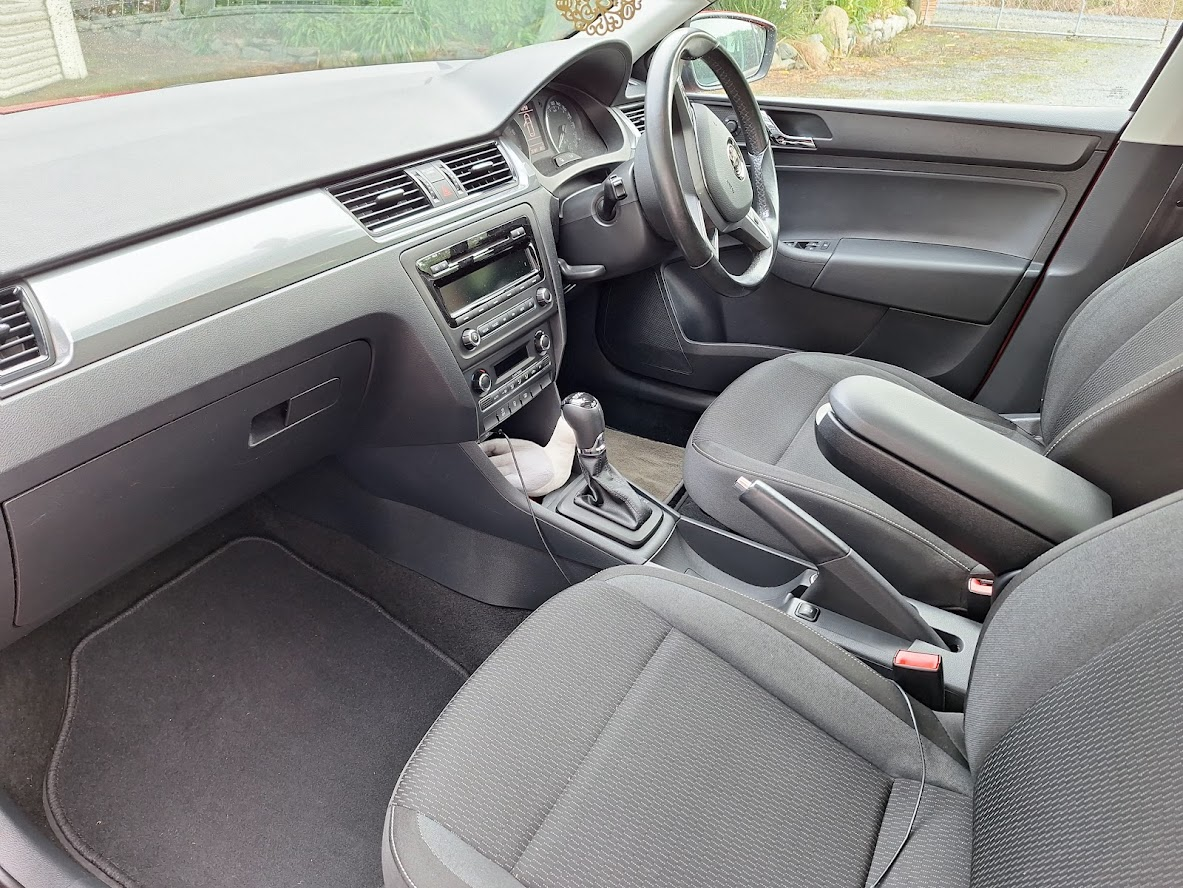
Front seats

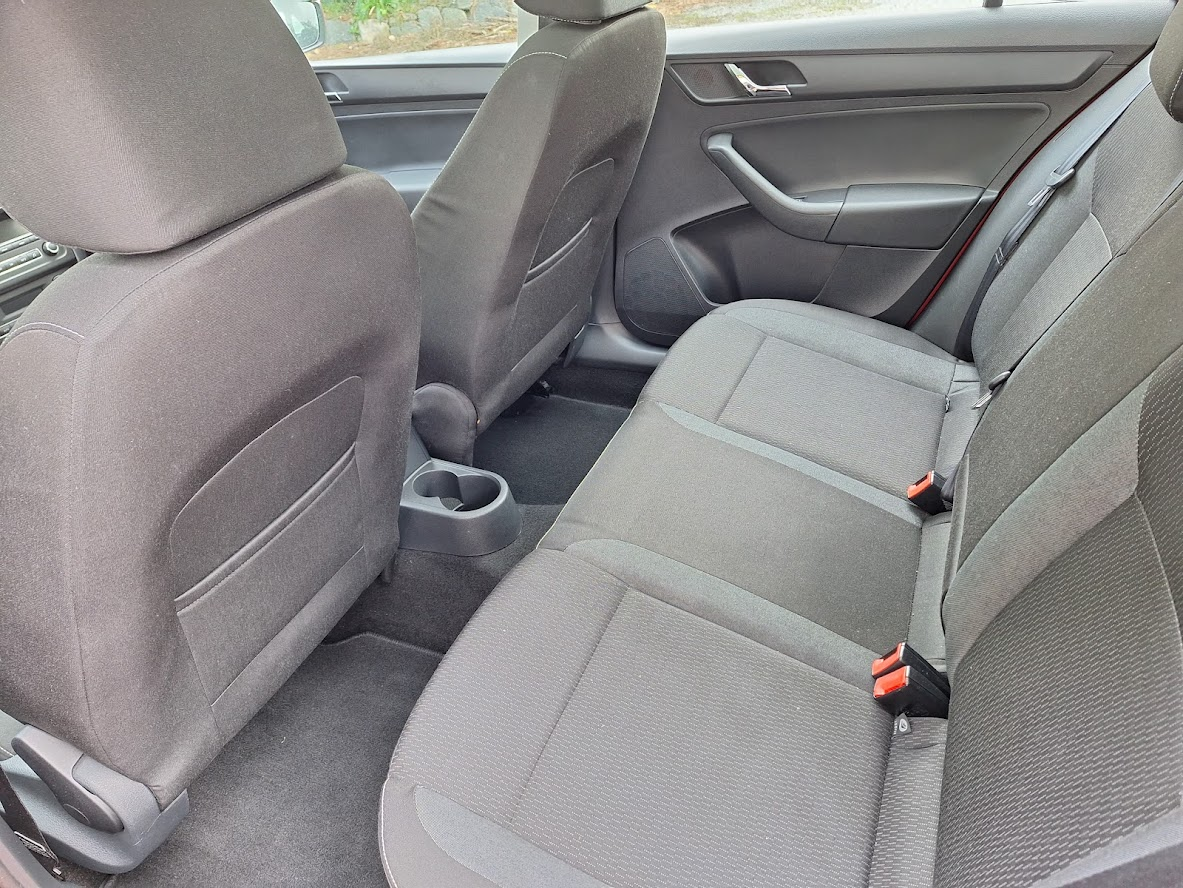
Back seats

While the Rapid in China is an alternate variant of the Volkswagen Santana, the Spaceback produced in co-operation with SVW is the European model.

== Four-door sedan ==
There are two Škoda four-door sedan models bearing the Rapid badge. In China, the Rapid shares body panels and other principal elements with the 2012 Chinese Volkswagen Santana, while still featuring identical front fascias with the European liftback.

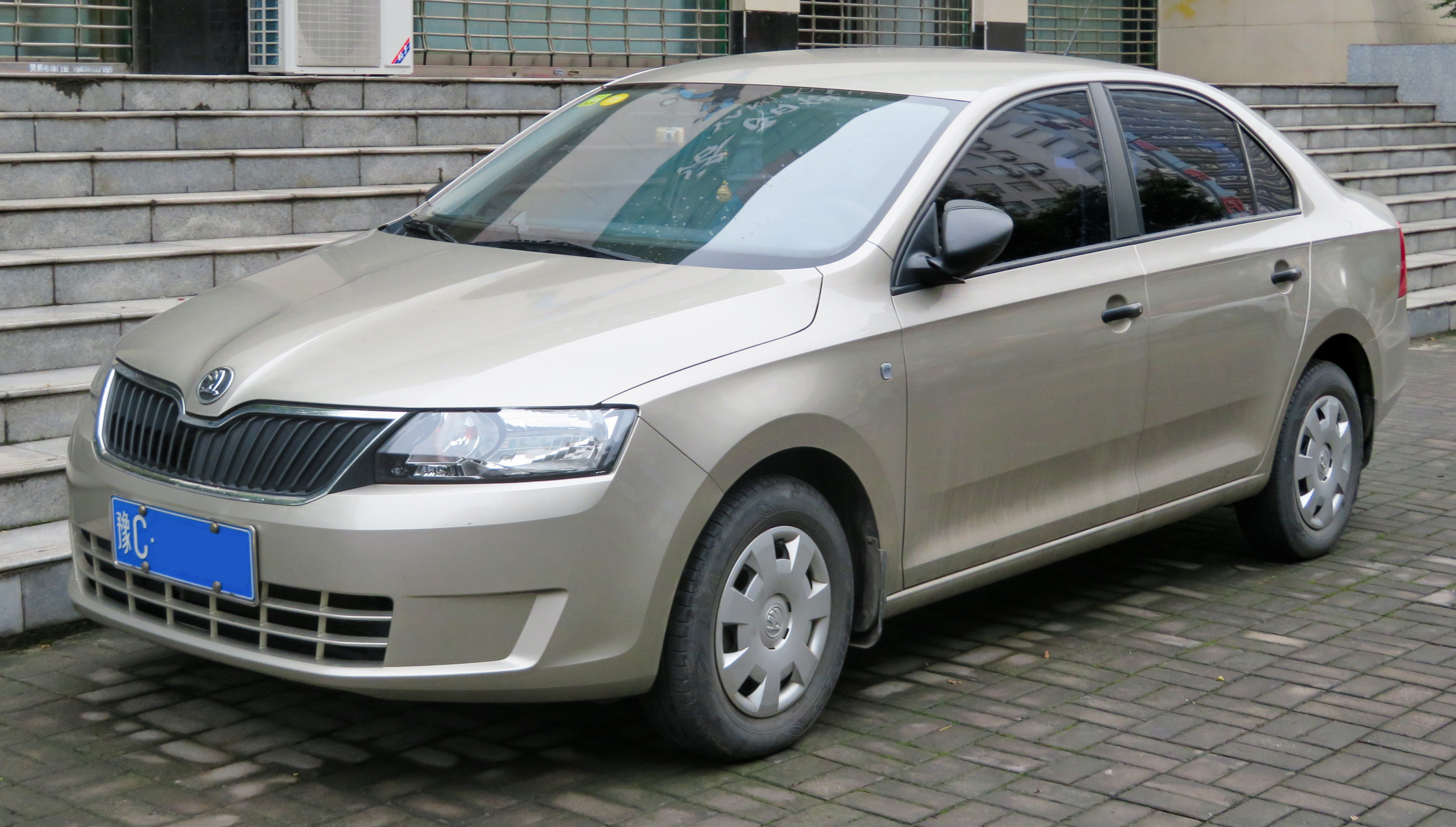
2014 Škoda Rapid sedan

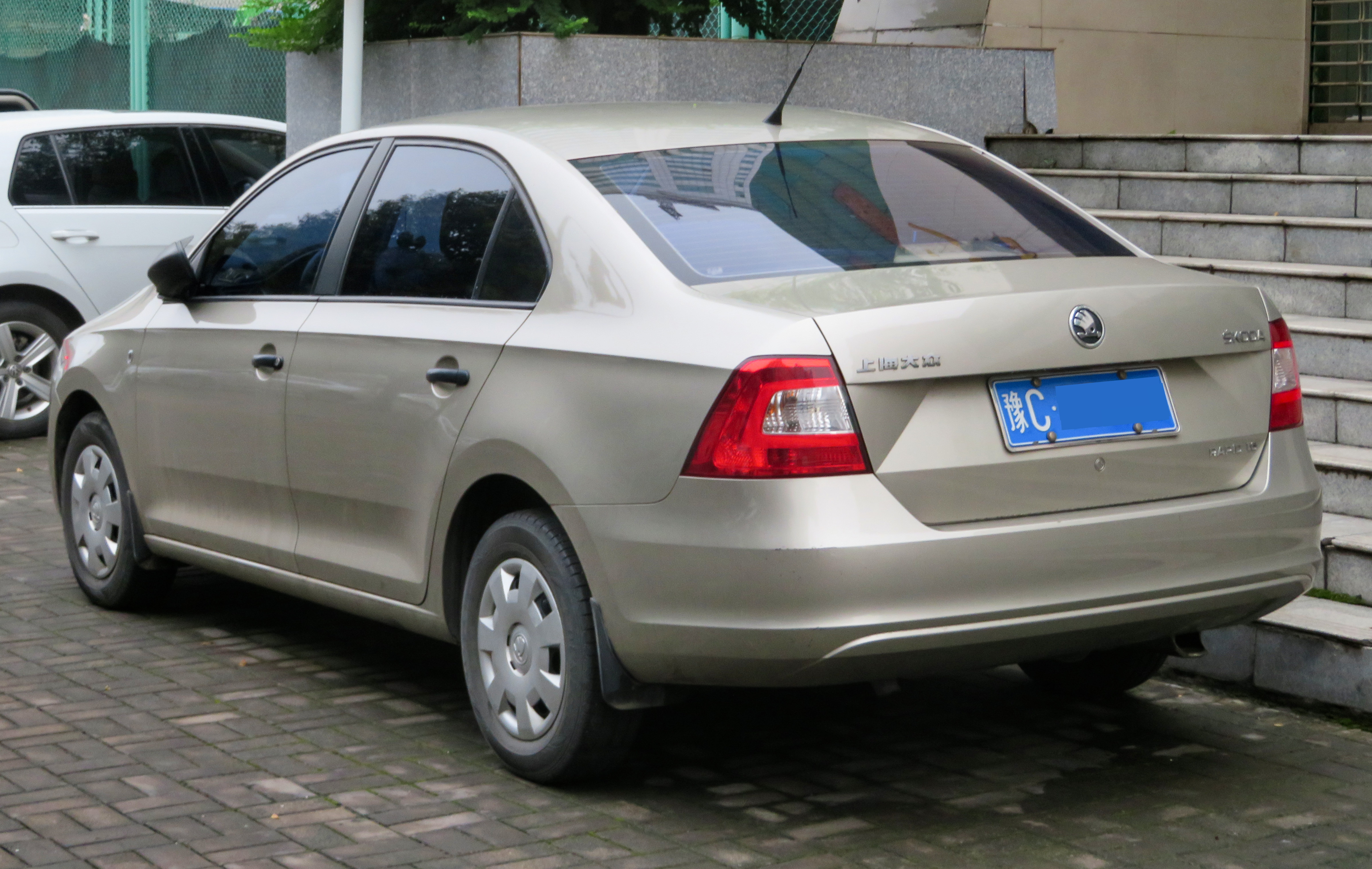
Rear view
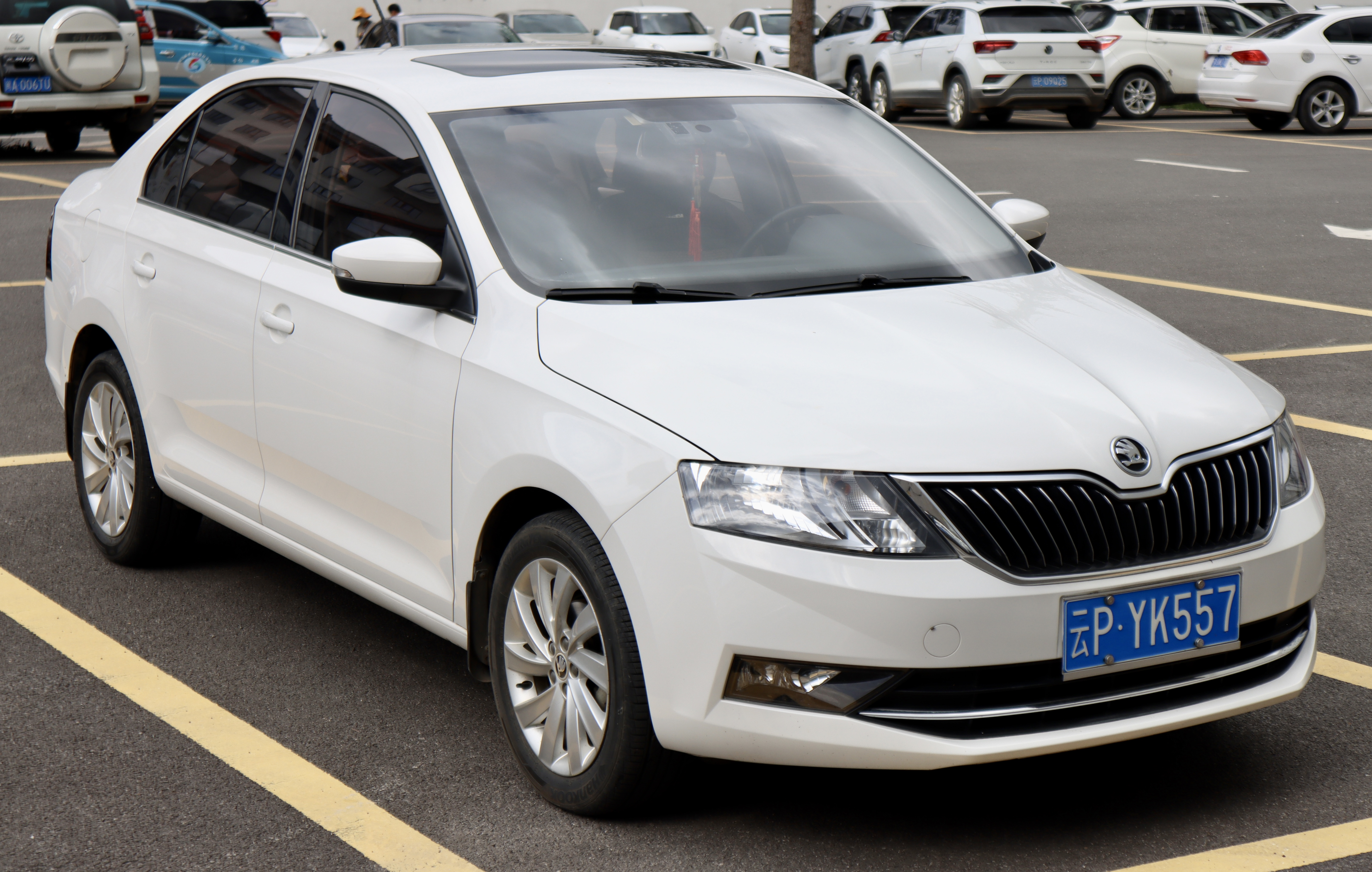
2018 Škoda Rapid sedan (minor facelift with higher trim level)

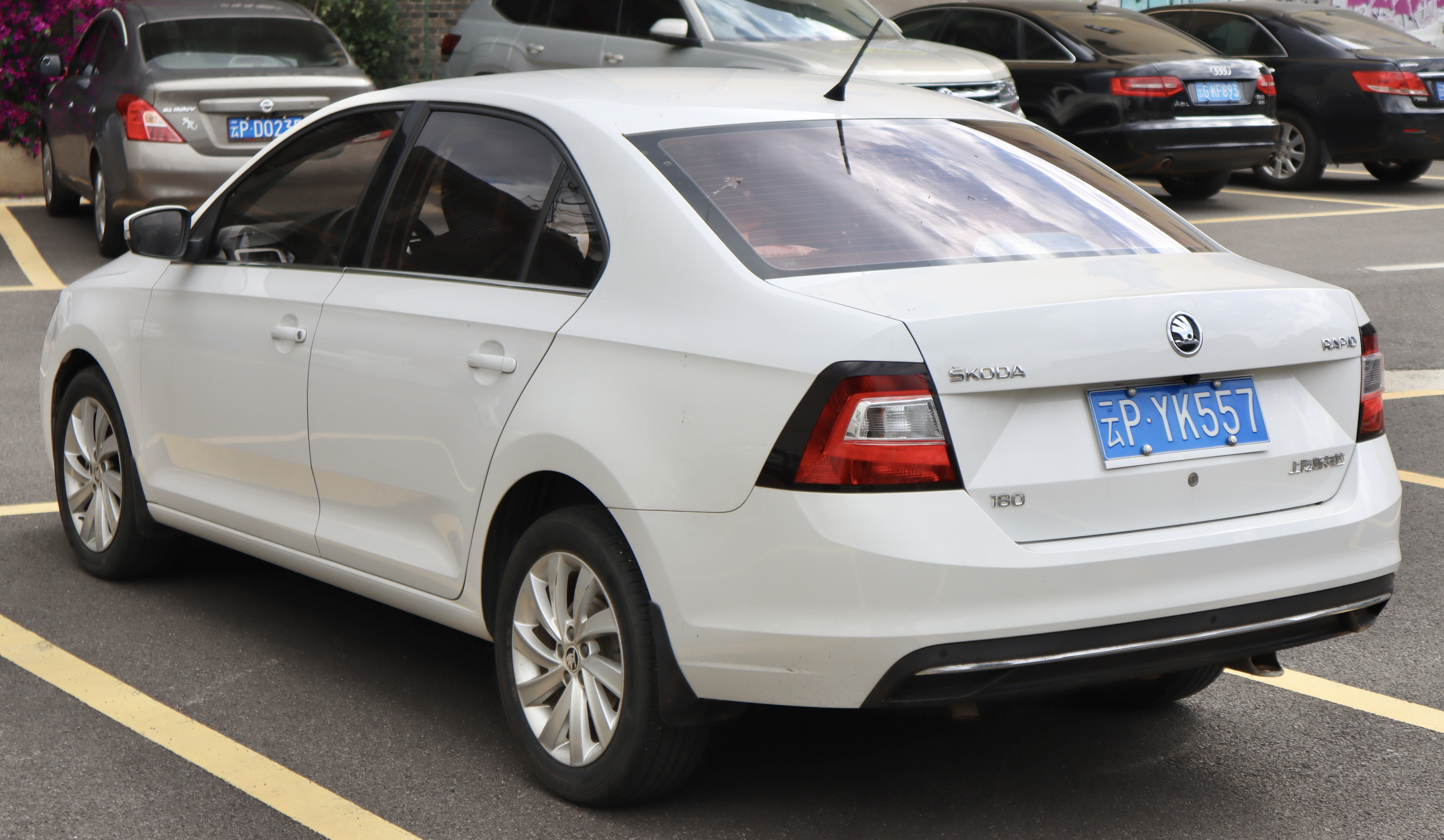
Rear view

The Indian manufactured Rapid, launched in 2011, is based on Volkswagen Vento (Polo) sedan, which is a completely different model. Despite the European version, both Chinese and Indian models are classic four-door three-box sedans.

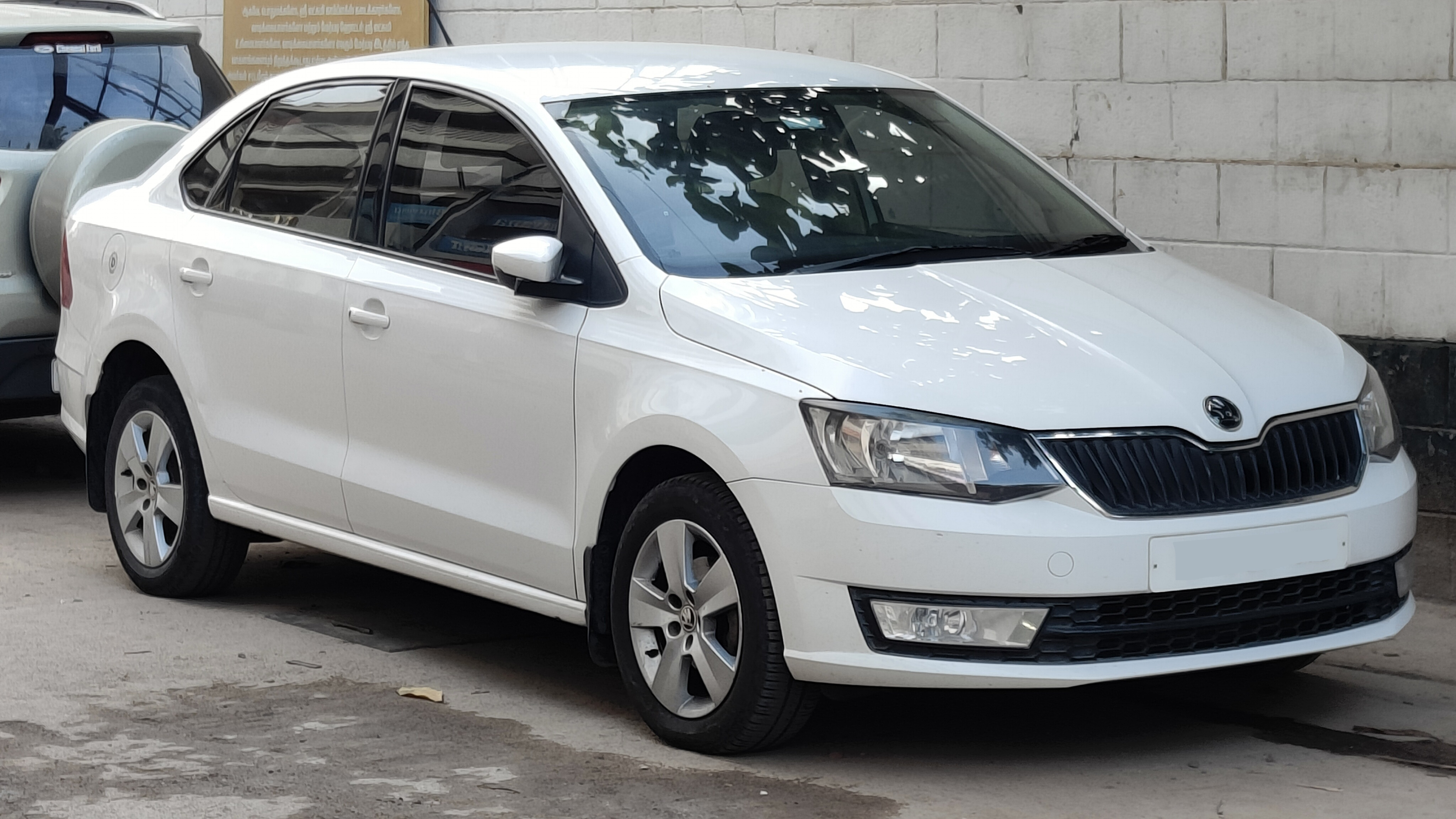
Indian Skoda Rapid (Vento-based)

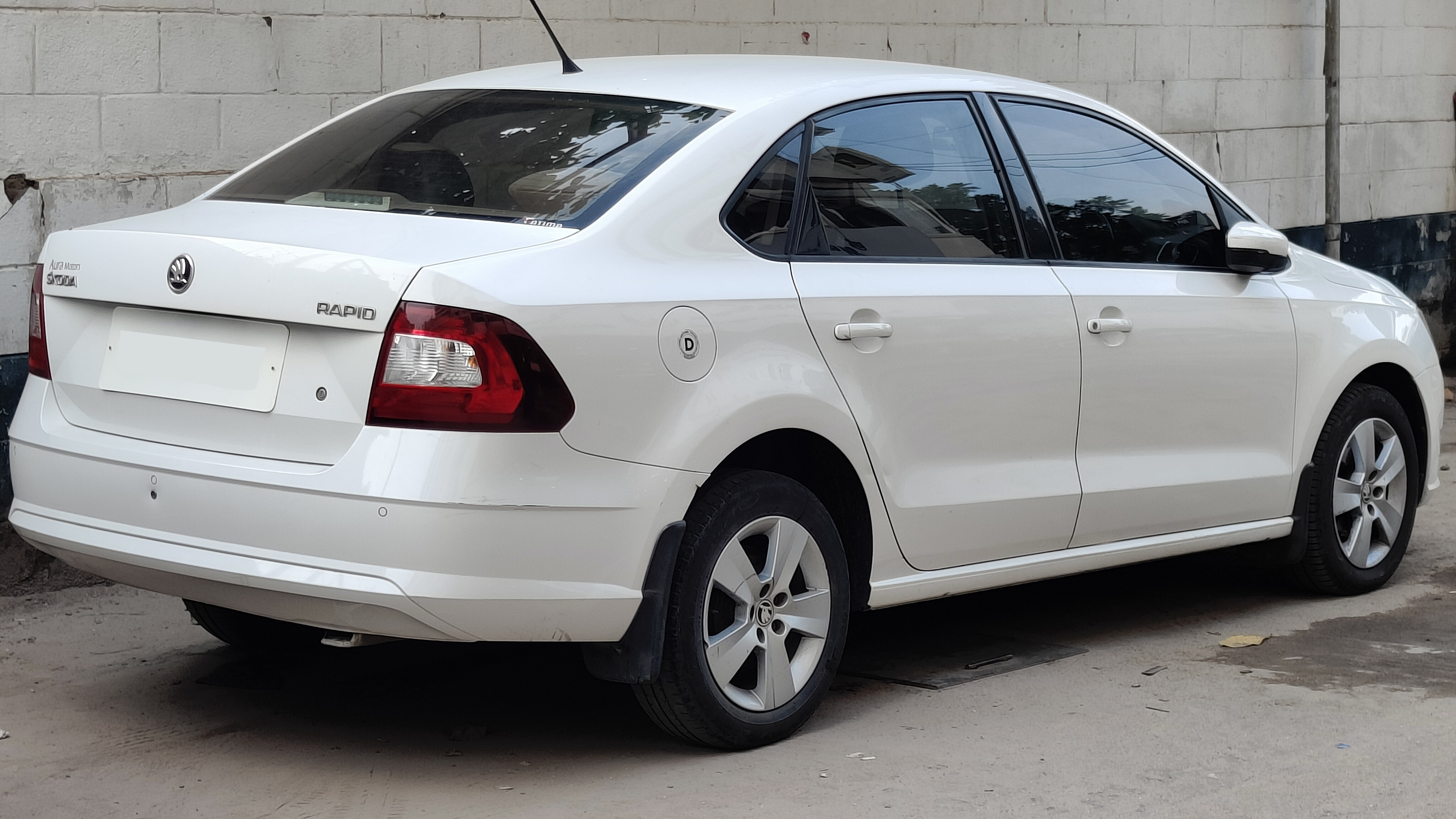
Rear view

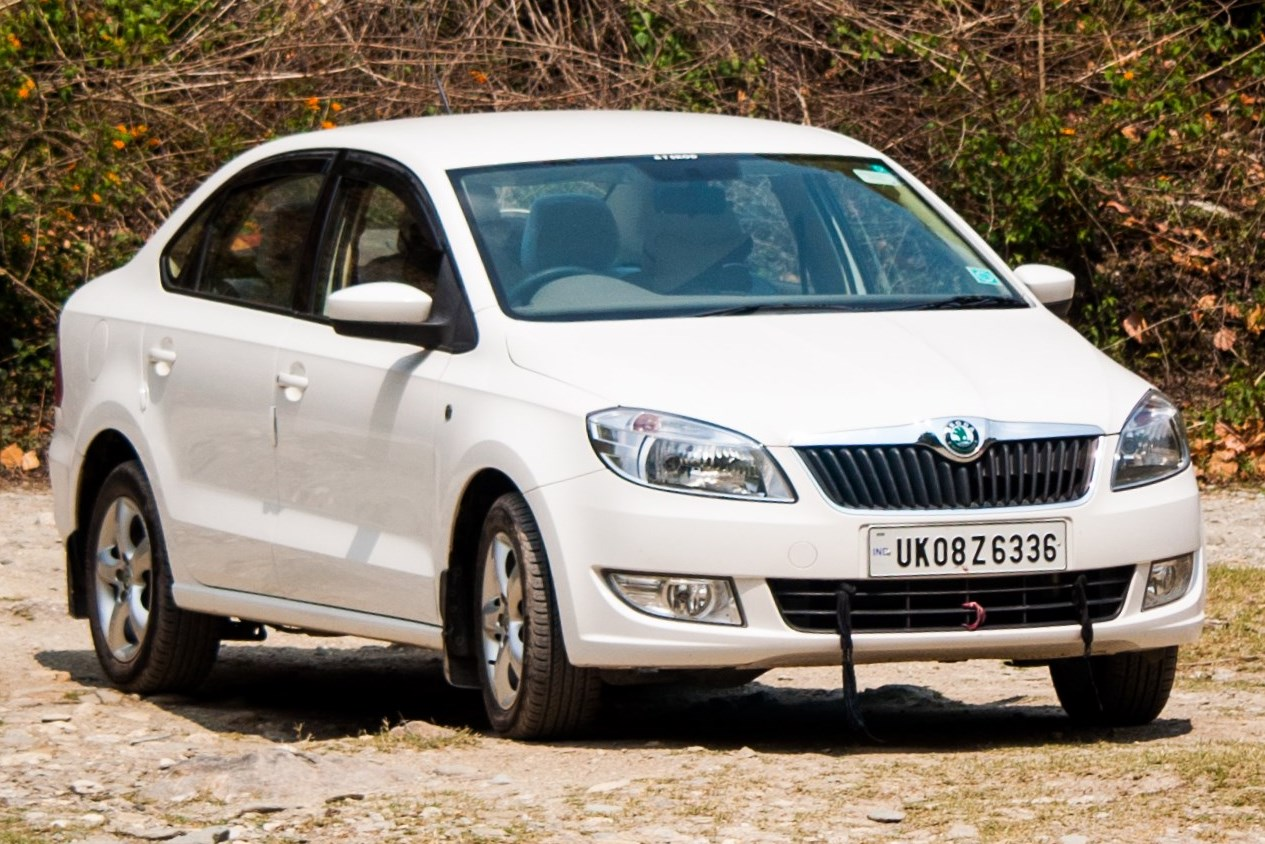
Indian Skoda Rapid (pre-facelift)

The Rapid introduced some new 'Simply Clever' details, i.e. double-sided mat in the boot (rubber/textile), warning vest holder under driver's seat, removable waste bin in door panelling and ice scraper on the fuel tank flap.

=== Facelifts ===
China's 2020 Škoda Rapid gets a different facelift from the Russia-spec 2020 model. For both the five-door Spaceback hatchback and four-door regular sedan, the facelifted Rapid for the Chinese market features new headlights and taillights inspired by the European Scala, an updated grille and refreshed bumpers. The updated interior of the Rapid gains a new 8-inch infotainment system that offers over-the-air updates, and supports both Android Auto and Apple smartphone connectivity. Both the refreshed Rapid and Rapid Spaceback in China are powered by a 1.5-liter four-cylinder petrol engine producing 111 PS (109 HP / 82 kW) and 145 Nm (107 lb-ft) of torque. Mated to either a five-speed manual gearbox or a six-speed automatic gearbox, the powertrain already complies with the updated China VI b emissions standard that came into effect since July 2023.

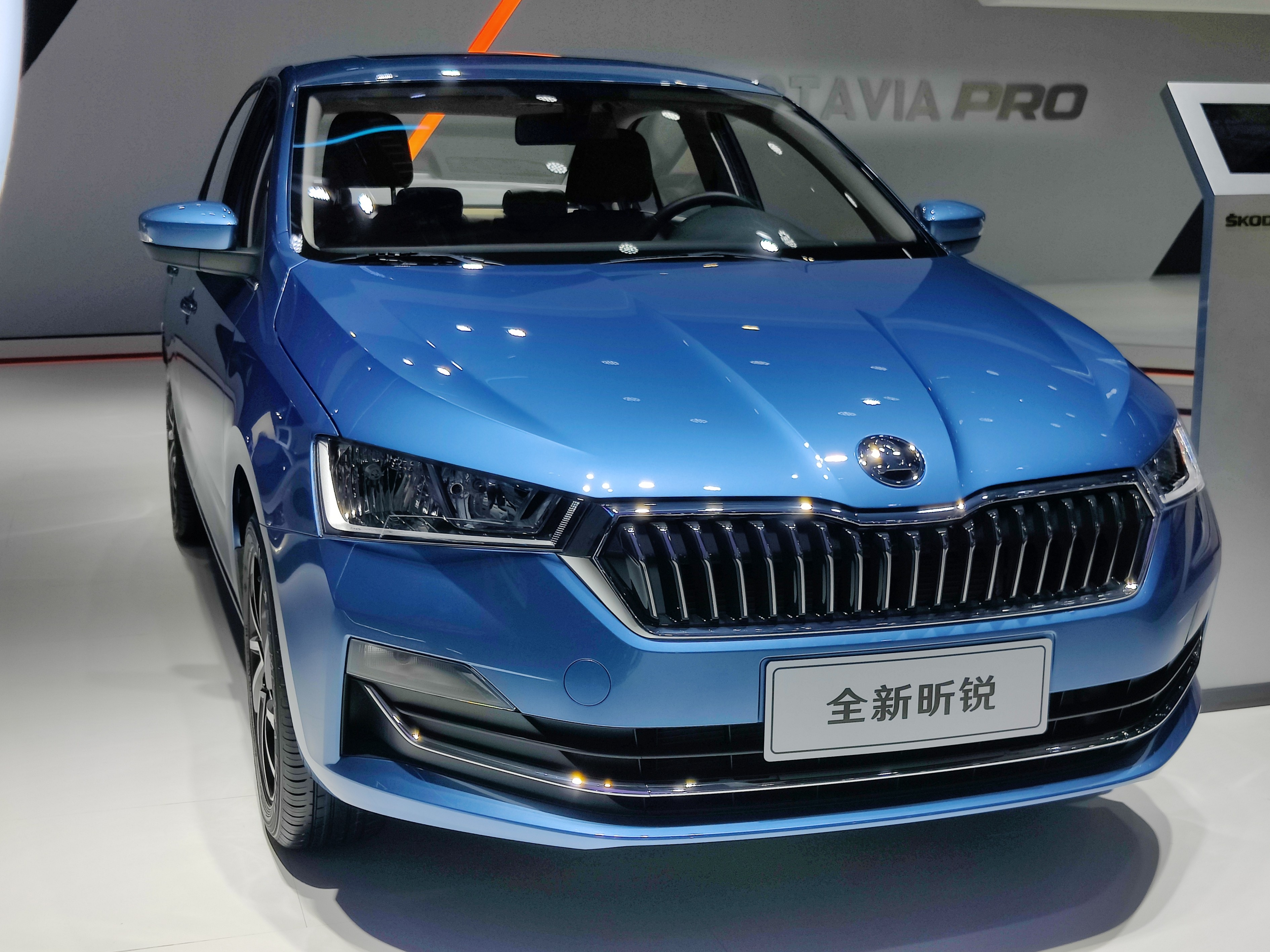
2020 Škoda Rapid sedan in China (front)

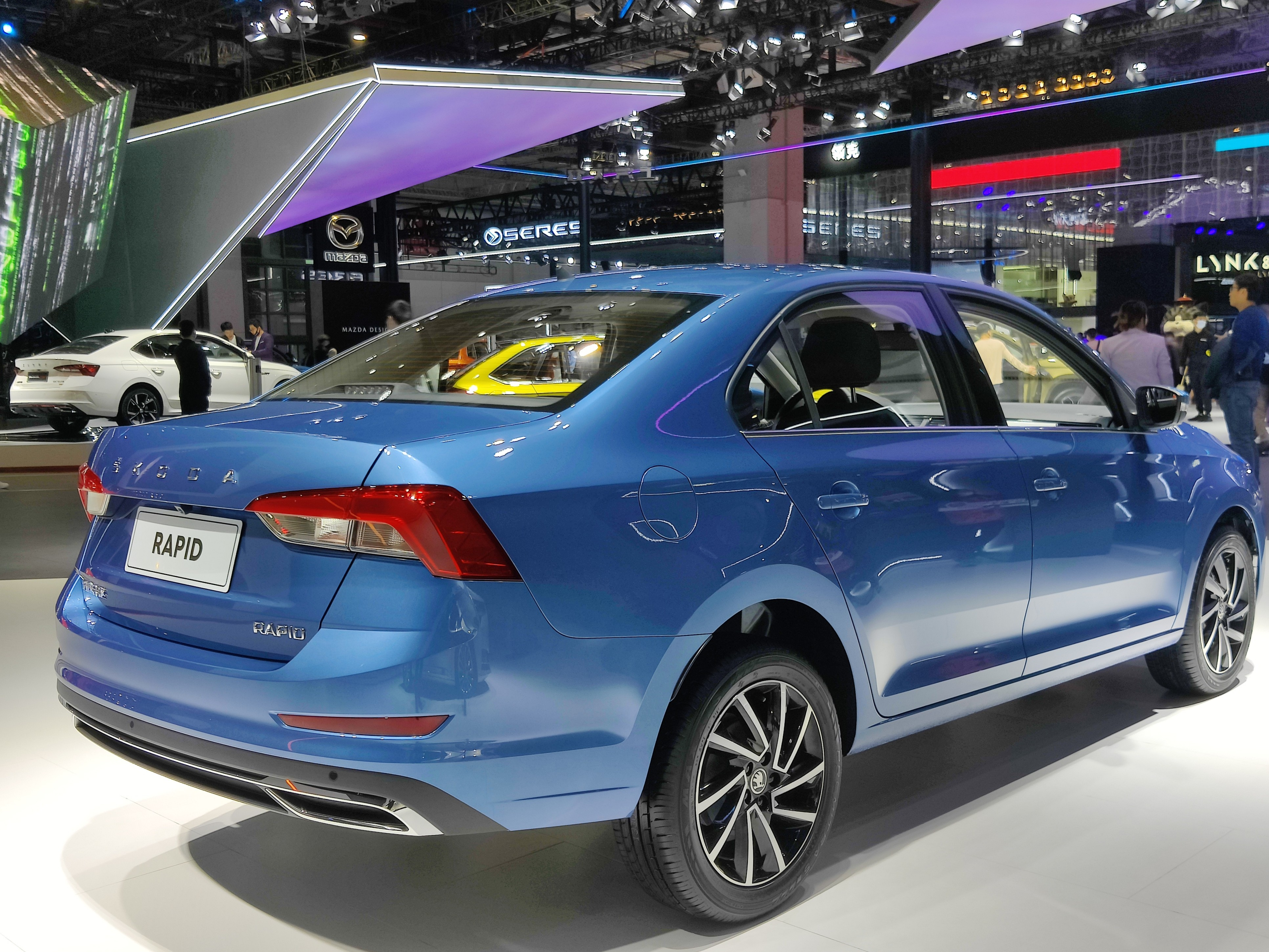
2020 Škoda Rapid sedan in China (rear)
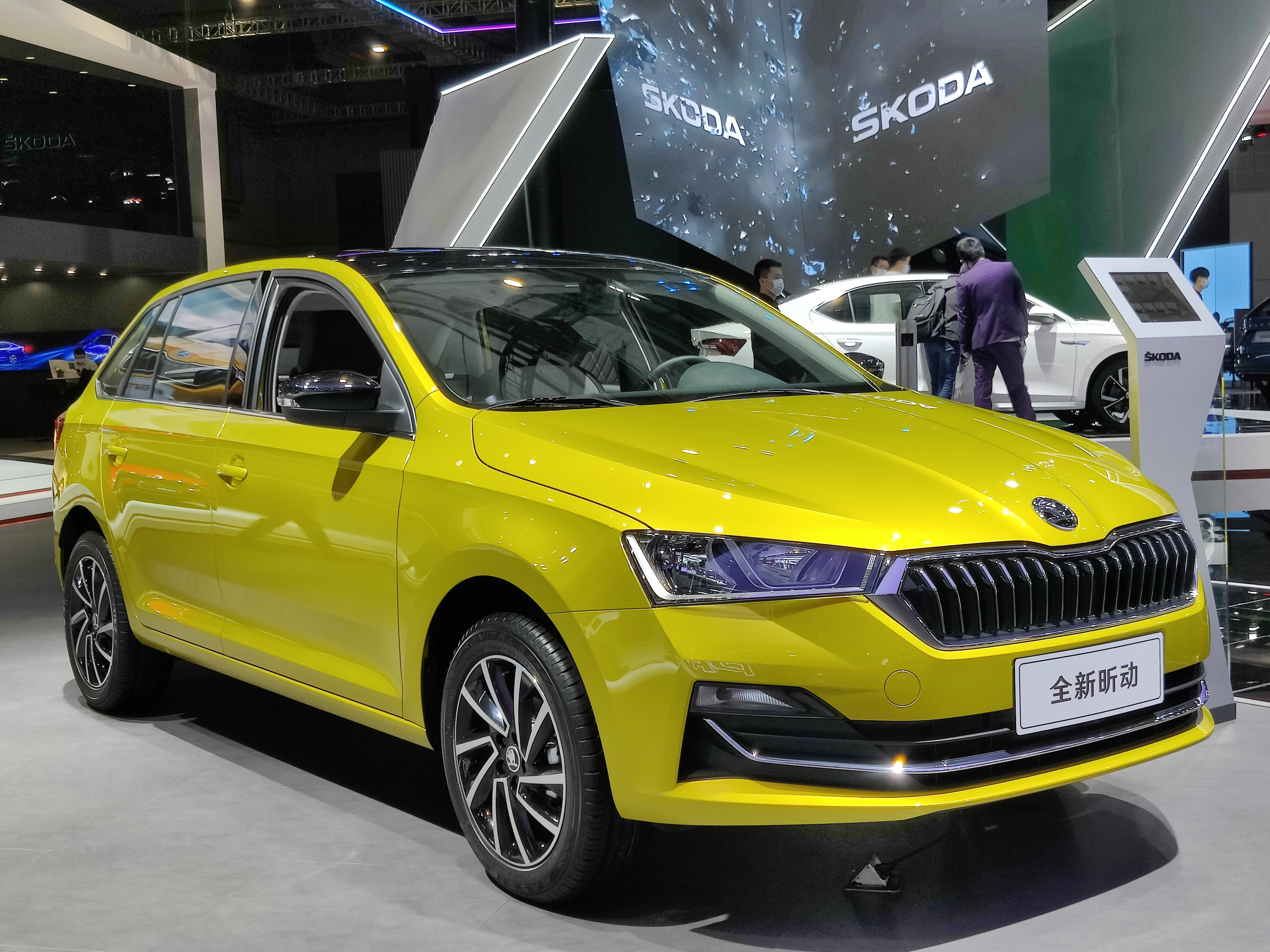
2020 Škoda Rapid Spaceback in China (front)

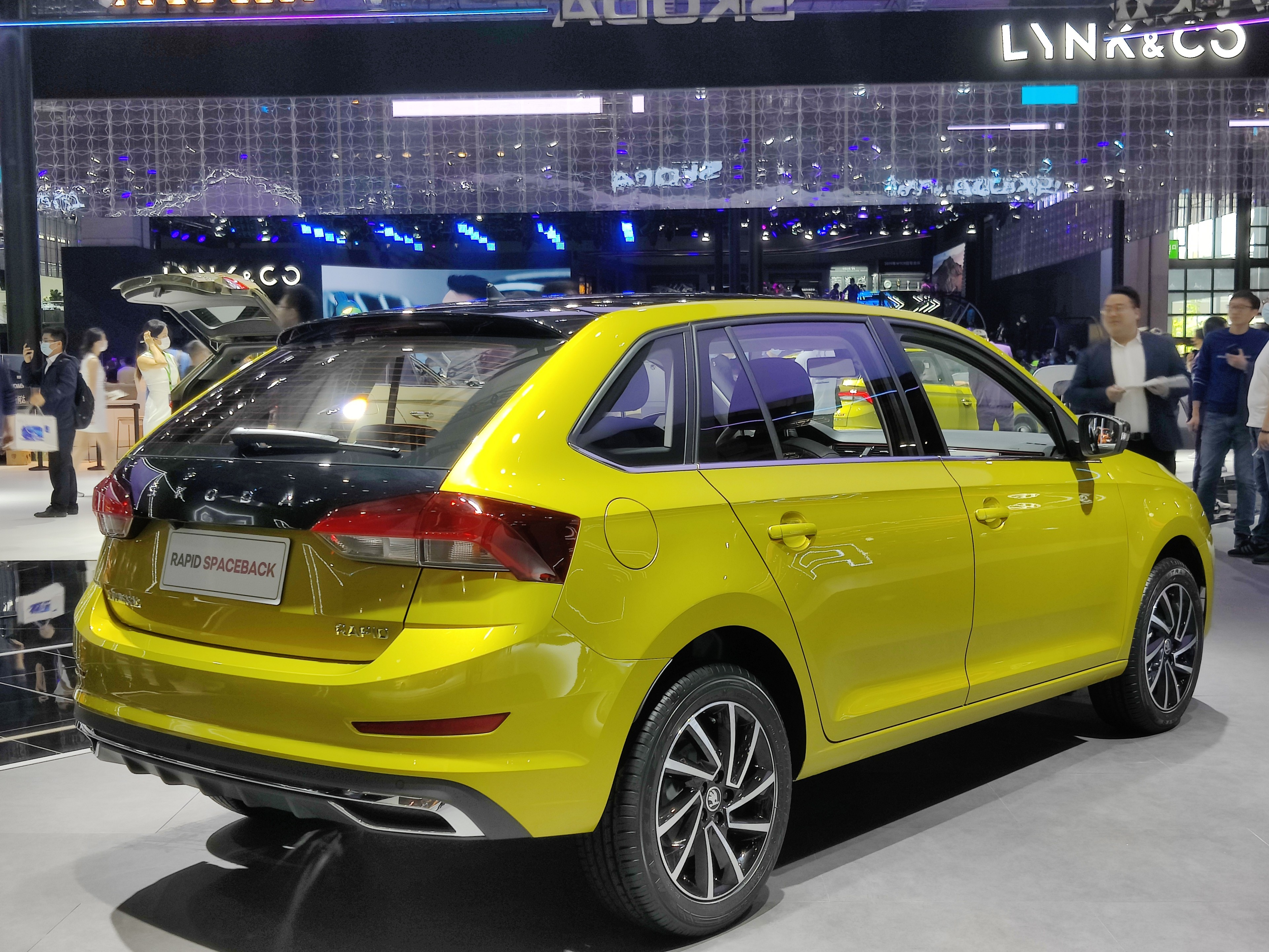
2020 Škoda Rapid Spaceback in China (rear)

== Safety ==
Euro NCAP test results* Škoda Rapid (2012)
| Test | Points | % |
|---|---|---|
| Overall: | 5 /5 stars | |
| Adult occupant: | 34 | 94% |
| Child occupant: | 39.2 | 80% |
| Pedestrian: | 24.7 | 69% |
| Safety assist: | 5 | 71% |

ANCAP test results* Skoda Rapid 4 cylinder petrol engine variants (2014)
| Test | Score |
|---|---|
| Overall | 5 /5 stars |
| Frontal offset | 15.37/16 |
| Side impact | 16/16 |
| Pole | 2/2 |
| Seat belt reminders | 2/3 |
| Whiplash protection | Adequate |
| Pedestrian protection | Adequate |
| Electronic stability control | Standard |

== Related models ==
=== Volkswagen Polo (CK; 2020–2022, Russia) ===
The 2020 Rapid liftback is used as the basis for the 2020 Volkswagen Polo for the Russian market and neighbouring CIS markets, replacing the Polo Mk5 sedan. The Rapid-based Polo was developed to cut costs instead of having to produce the MQB A0-based Volkswagen Virtus in Russia. To differentiate it from the Rapid, Volkswagen had redesigned the front end inspired by the Jetta A7, with its front bumper and hood panel shared with the Chinese-market Jetta VA3, and a unique rear end styling. The Russian-market Polo was also built at the Volkswagen Group Rus plant in Kaluga, Russia. The car's production was discontinued after only 2 years in the market after Volkswagen Group's decision to withdraw from Russia after the 2022 Russian invasion of Ukraine.

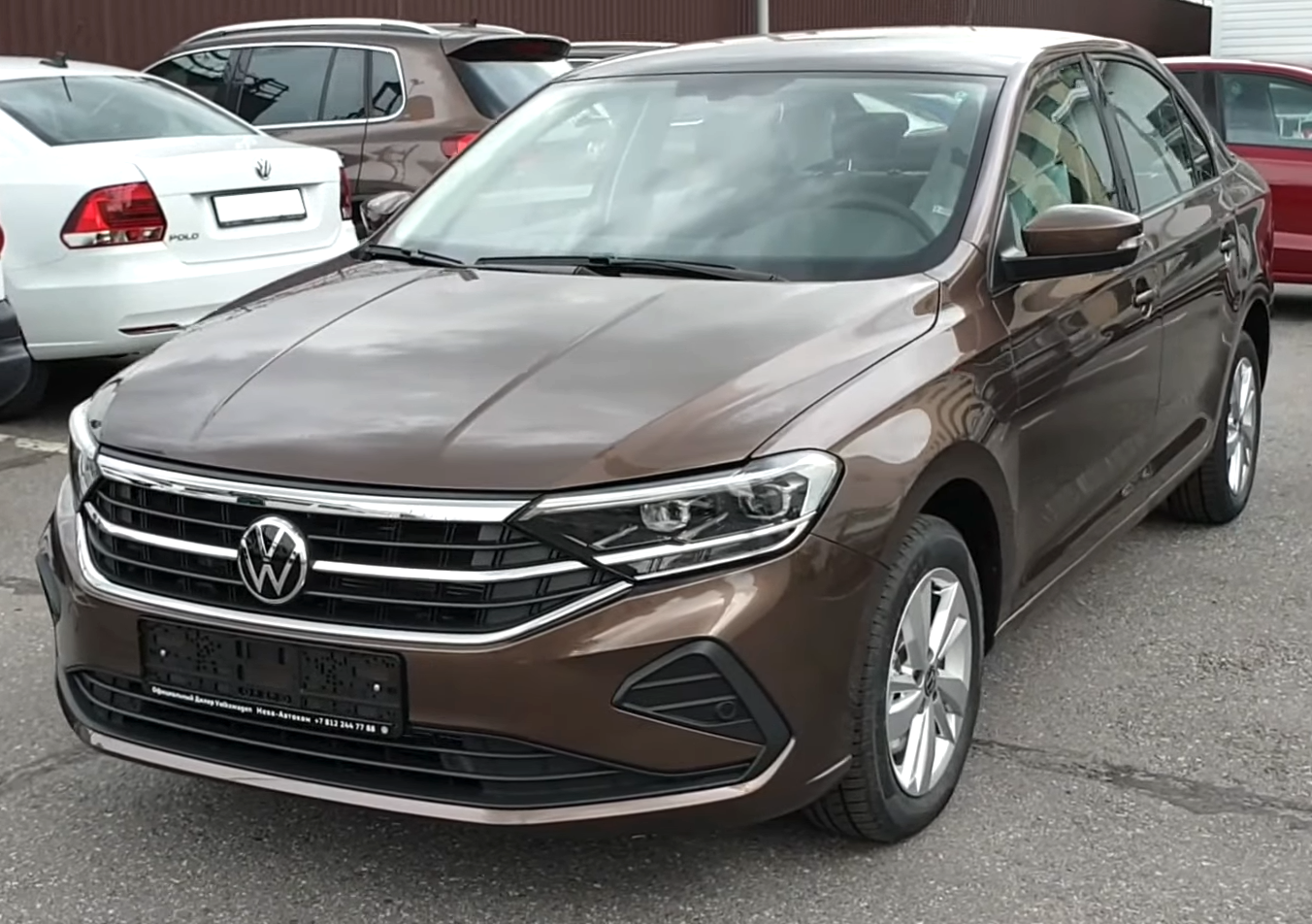
Volkswagen Polo (Russia)

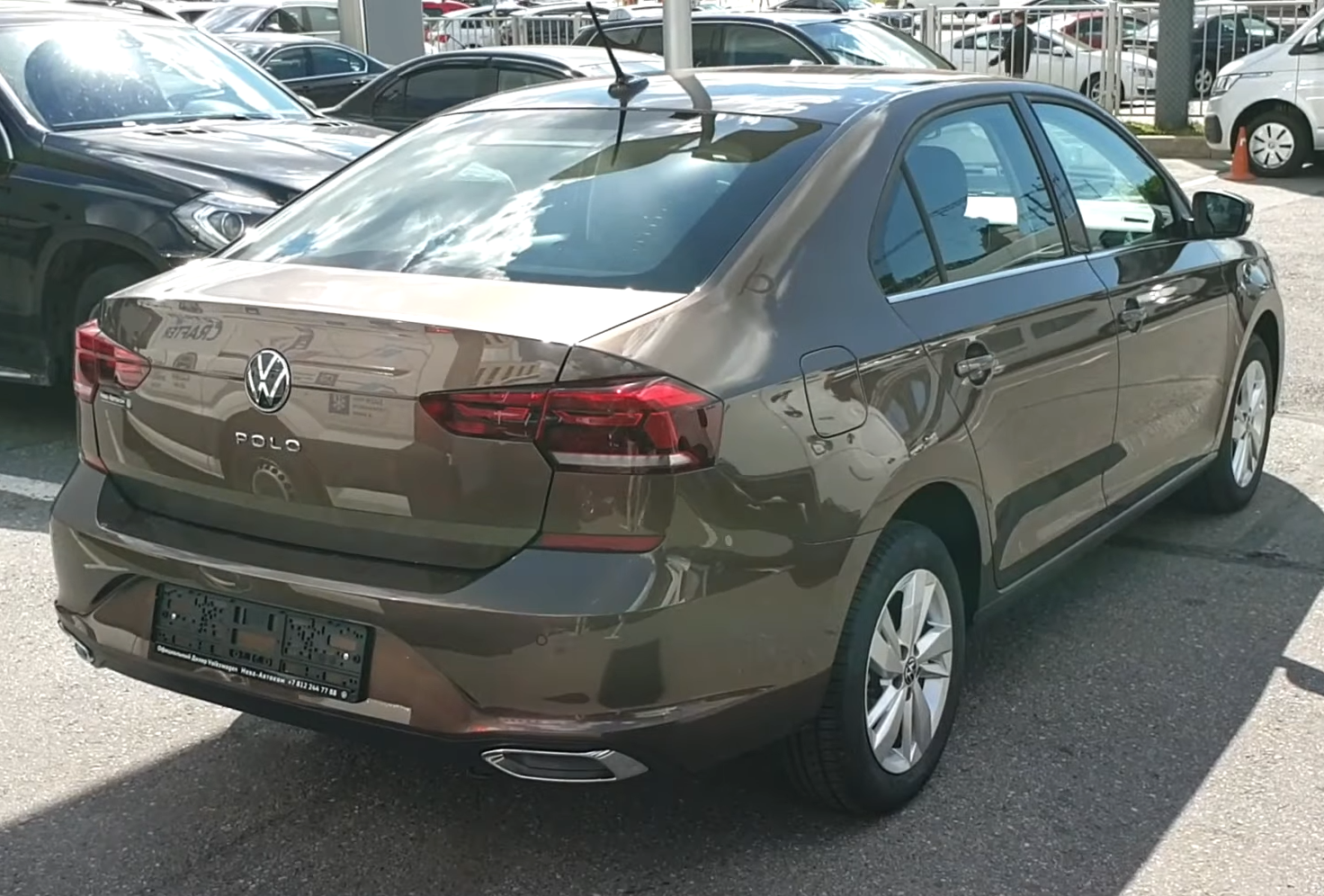
Volkswagen Polo (Russia)

=== SEAT Toledo (2012–2019, Europe) ===
A concept car based on the Toledo Mk4 production model was presented at the 2012 Geneva Motor Show. This vehicle is closely related to the Škoda Rapid as a five door liftback, both are based on an adaptation of the A05+ (PQ25) platform and are assembled in the same Škoda factory in Mladá Boleslav.

The Toledo commenced sales in Spain and Portugal towards the end of 2012, and the rest of Europe and Mexico in the beginning of 2013, with the all new Toledo sitting in between the smaller Ibiza supermini and the larger Leon small family car.

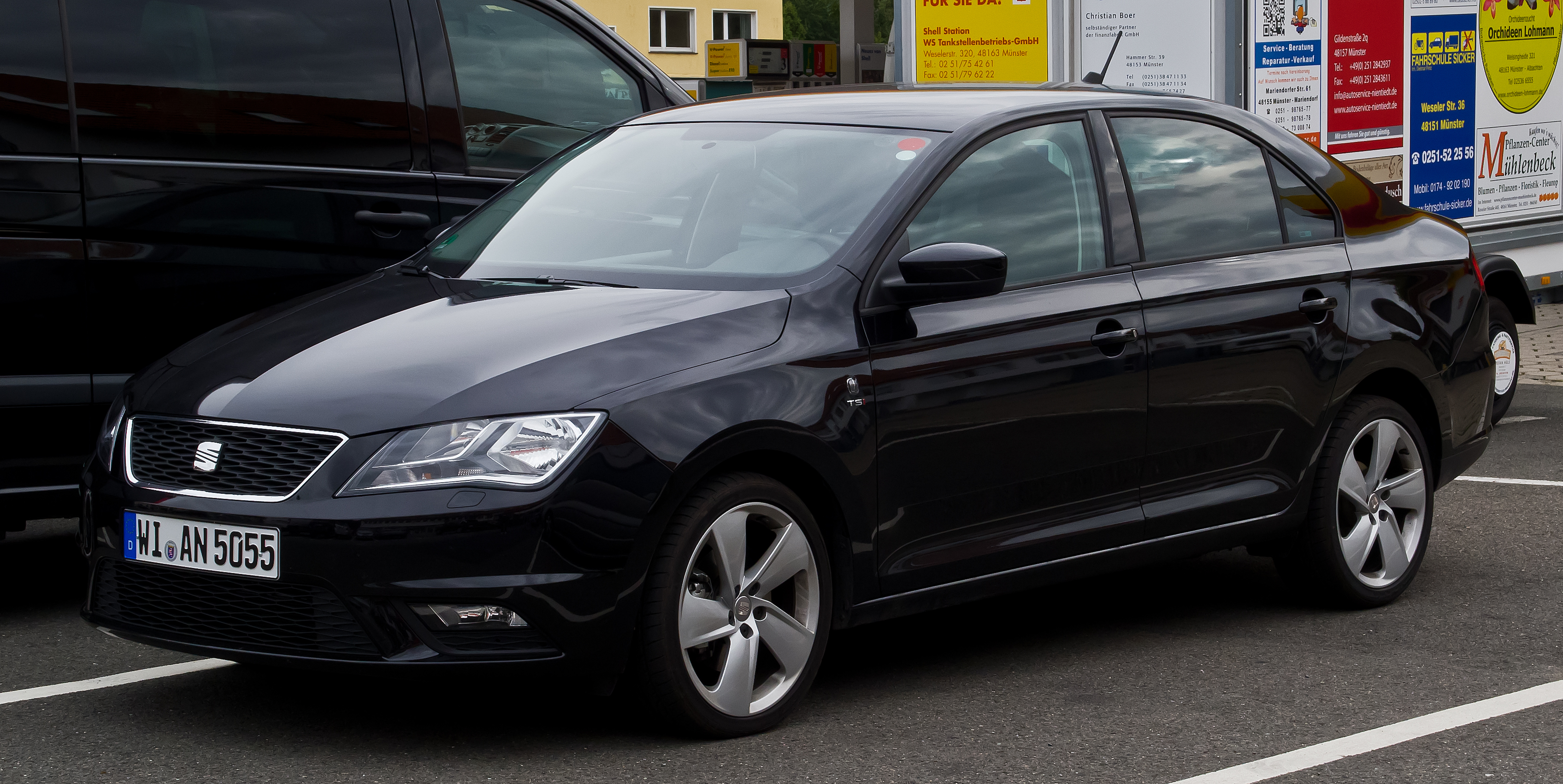
SEAT Toledo

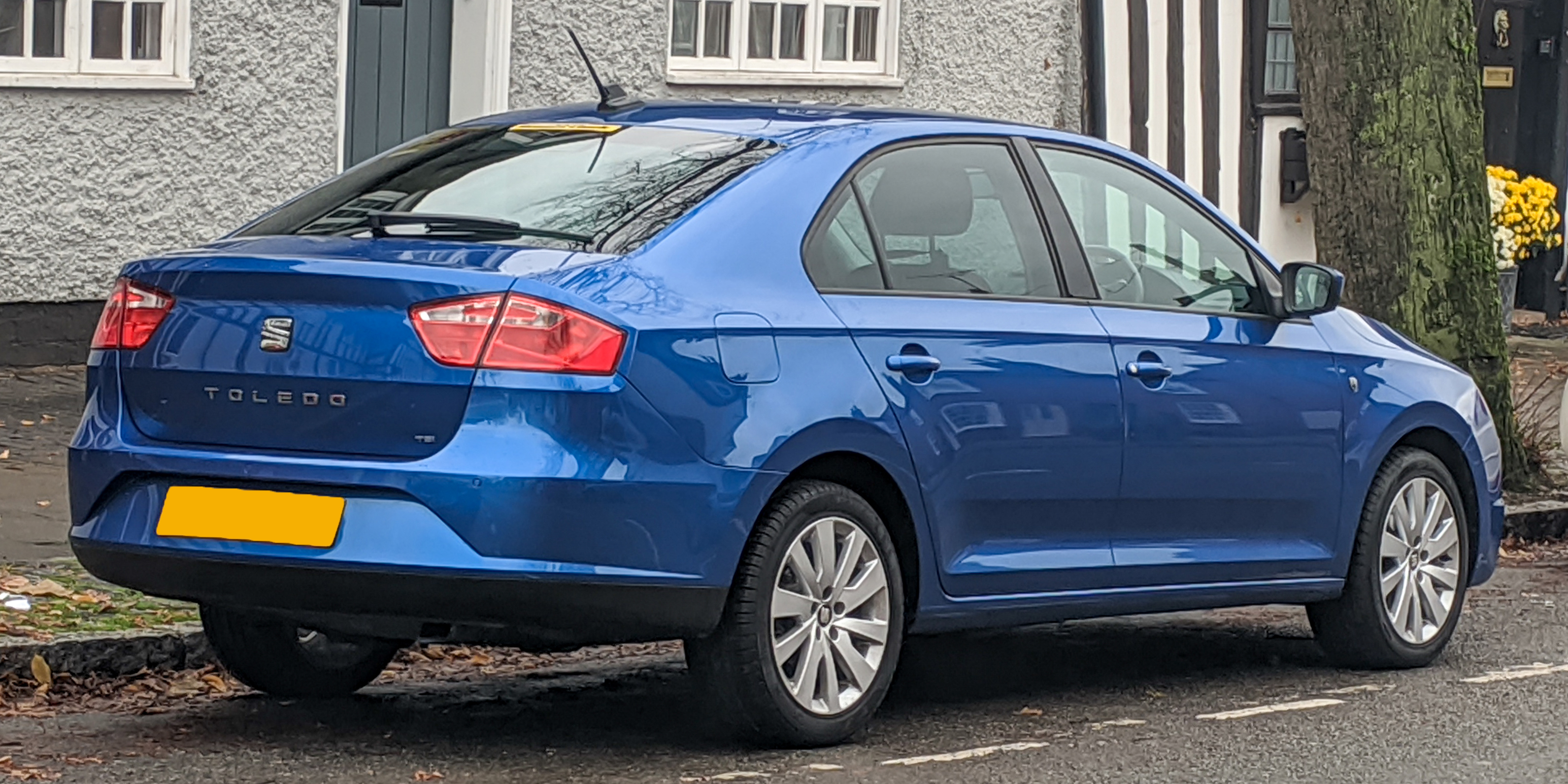
SEAT Toledo (rear)

== Engines ==
Overview of engines available for the Rapid (NH3) and Rapid Spaceback (NH1).

=== Petrol engines ===
| Engine designation | Production | Engine code (family) | Displacement, configuration, valvetrain, fuel system, aspiration | Motive power at rpm | max. torque at rpm | Gearbox (type), drive | Top speed | 0–100 km/h [s] (0–62 mph) | Combined consumption [l/100 km / mpg imp / mpg US] | CO2 [g/km] |
|---|---|---|---|---|---|---|---|---|---|---|
| 1.0 TSI | 2017– | – | 999 cc I3, 12V DOHC, turbocharged | 70 kW (95 PS; 94 hp) at 5500 rpm | 160 N⋅m (118 lb⋅ft) at 3500 rpm | 5-speed manual, 7-speed automatic | 187 km/h (116 mph) | 11 | – | – |
| 1.0 TSI | 2017– | – | 999 cc I3, 12V DOHC, turbocharged | 81 kW (110 PS; 109 hp) at 5600 rpm | 200 N⋅m (148 lb⋅ft) at 3500 rpm | 6-speed manual | 200 km/h (124 mph) | 9.8 | – | – |
| 1.2 MPI | 2012–2015 | CGPC (EA111) | 1198 cc I3, 12V DOHC, MPI, naturally aspirated | 55 kW (75 PS; 74 hp) at 5400 rpm | 112 N⋅m (83 lb⋅ft) at 3750 rpm | 5-speed manual (MQ200), FWD | 175 km/h (109 mph) | 13.9 | 5.8 / 48.7 / 40.6 | 134 |
| 1.2 TSI | 2012–2015 | CBZA (EA111) | 1197 cc I4, 8V SOHC, TSI, turbocharged | 63 kW (86 PS; 84 hp) at 4800 rpm | 160 N⋅m (118 lb⋅ft) at 1500–3500 rpm | 5-speed manual (MQ200), FWD | 183 km/h (114 mph) | 11.8 | 5.1 55.4 / 46.1 (4.9 / 57.6 / 48.0)* | 119 (114*) |
| 1.2 TSI | 2015– | CJZC (EA211) | 1197 cc I4, 16V DOHC, TSI, turbocharged | 66 kW (90 PS; 89 hp) at 4400 rpm | 160 N⋅m (118 lb⋅ft) at 1400–3500 rpm | 5-speed manual (MQ200), FWD | 186 km/h (116 mph) | 11.2 | 4.7 60.1 / 50.1 | 107 |
| 1.2 TSI | 2012–2015 | CBZB (EA111) | 1197 cc I4, 8V SOHC, TSI, turbocharged | 77 kW (105 PS; 103 hp) at 5000 rpm | 175 N⋅m (129 lb⋅ft) at 1550–4100 | 6-speed manual (MQ200), FWD | 195 km/h (121 mph) | 10.3 | 5.4 / 52.3 / 43.6 (5.0 / 56.5 / 47.0)* | 125 (116*) |
| 1.2 TSI | 2015– | CJZD (EA211) | 1197 cc I4, 16V DOHC, TSI, turbocharged | 81 kW (110 PS; 109 hp) at 4600 rpm | 175 N⋅m (129 lb⋅ft) at 1400–4000 | 6-speed manual (MQ200), FWD | 200 km/h (124 mph) | 9.8 | 4.9 / 57.7 / 48 | 110 |
| 1.4 TSI | 2012–2015 | CAXA (EA111) | 1390 cc I4, 16V DOHC, TSI, turbocharged | 90 kW (122 PS; 121 hp) at 5000 rpm | 200 N⋅m (148 lb⋅ft) at 1500–4000 | 7-speed automatic (DQ200), FWD | 206 km/h (128 mph) | 9.5 | 5.8 / 48.7 / 40.6 (5.4 / 52.3 / 43.6)* | 134 (125*) |
| 1.4 TSI | 2015– | CZEA (EA211) | 1395 cc I4, 16V DOHC, TSI, turbocharged | 92 kW (125 PS; 123 hp) at 5000 rpm | 200 N⋅m (148 lb⋅ft) at 1400–4000 | 7-speed automatic (DQ200), FWD | 208 km/h (129 mph) | 9.0 | 4.8 / 58.85 / 49 | 114 |

=== Diesel engines ===
| Engine designation | Production | Engine code (family) | Displacement, configuration, valvetrain, fuel system, aspiration | Motive power at rpm | max. torque at rpm | Gearbox (type), drive | Top speed | 0–100 km/h [s] (0–62 mph) | Combined consumption [l/100 km / mpg imp / mpg US] | CO2 [g/km] |
|---|---|---|---|---|---|---|---|---|---|---|
| 1.6 TDI CR | 2013–2015 | CAYB (EA189) | 1598 cc I4, 16V common-rail, turbocharged | 66 kW (90 PS; 89 hp) at 4200 rpm | 180 N⋅m (133 lb⋅ft) at 2000 rpm | 5-speed manual (MQ200), FWD | 184 km/h (114 mph) | 12.0 | 4.4 / 64.2 / 53.5 (3.9 / 72.4 / 60.3)* | 114 (104*) |
| 1.6 TDI CR GreenLine | 2013–2015 | (EA189) | 1598 cc I4, 16V common-rail, turbocharged | 66 kW (90 PS; 89 hp) at 4200 rpm | 230 N⋅m (170 lb⋅ft) at 1500–2500 rpm | 5-speed manual (MQ200), FWD | 186 km/h (116 mph) | 12.0 | 3.8 / 74.3 / 61.9 | 99 |
| 1.4 TDI CR | 2015– | CUSB (EA288) | 1422 cc I3, 12V common-rail, turbocharged | 66 kW (90 PS; 89 hp) at 3500 rpm | 230 N⋅m (170 lb⋅ft) at 1750–2500 rpm | 5-speed manual (MQ200), FWD | 183 km/h (114 mph) | 12.0 | 3.6 / 78.5 / 65.3 | 94 |
| 1.4 TDI CR | 2015– | CUSB (EA288) | 1422 cc I3, 12V common-rail, turbocharged | 66 kW (90 PS; 89 hp) at 3500 rpm | 230 N⋅m (170 lb⋅ft) at 1750–2500 rpm | 7-speed automatic (DQ200), FWD | 182 km/h (113 mph) | 12.5 | 3.8 / 74.3 / 61.9 | 99 |
| 1.6 TDI CR | 2013–2015 | CAYB (EA189) | 1598 cc I4, 16V common-rail, turbocharged | 66 kW (90 PS; 89 hp) at 4200 rpm | 230 N⋅m (170 lb⋅ft) at 1500–2500 rpm | 7-speed automatic (DQ200), FWD | 184 km/h (114 mph) | 12.2 | 4.5 / 62.8 / 52.3 | 118 |
| 1.6 TDI CR | 2012–2015 | CAYC (EA189) | 1598 cc I4, 16V common-rail, turbocharged | 77 kW (105 PS; 103 hp) at 4400 rpm | 250 N⋅m (184 lb⋅ft) at 1500–2500 rpm | 5-speed manual (MQ200), FWD | 190 km/h (118 mph) | 10.4 | 4.4 / 64.2 / 53.5 (3.9 / 72.4 / 60.3)* | 114 (104*) |
| 1.6 TDI CR | 2015– | CRKB (EA288) | 1598 cc I4, 16V common-rail, turbocharged | 85 kW (116 PS; 114 hp) at 3500 rpm | 250 N⋅m (184 lb⋅ft) at 1500–3000 rpm | 5-speed manual (MQ200), FWD | 201 km/h (125 mph) | 10.0 | 4.2 / 67.3 / 56 | 109 |

(*) Valid for cars with so called Green tec (Start-Stop, brake energy recovery)

== Sales ==
| Year | Europe | China | Russia |
|---|---|---|---|
| 2012 | 2,929 | | |
| 2013 | 38,447 | 36,052 | |
| 2014 | 76,925 | 78,256 | 19,975 |
| 2015 | 67,974 | 57,568 | 24,547 |
| 2016 | 67,423 | 67,149 | 25,931 |
| 2017 | 66,512 | 64,853 | 29,445 |
| 2018 | 60,906 | 58,849 | 35,089 |
| 2019 | 28,110 | 45,758 | 35,121 |
| 2020 | 311 | 30,157 | 26,267 |
| 2021 | | 10,150 | 41,680 |

== Bibliography ==
- "Auto Motor und Sport Heft 16, 2013 "Skoda Rapid Spaceback: Der Spaceback ist kürzer als die Limousine, bietet aber viele Variations- und Individualisierungs-Möglichkeiten"" (in German). Motorbuch Verlag. 2013: 10.
