= Volkswagen Group Rus =

Subsidiary of Volkswagen AG

- Native name: ФОЛЬКСВАГЕН Груп Рус
- Company type: Subsidiary
- Industry: Automotive
- Founded: 2003; 23 years ago
- Defunct: 22 May 2023
- Headquarters: Moscow, Russia
- Number of locations: 3 (2021)
- Area served: Russia
- Key people: Stefan Mecha CEO
- Products: Automobiles, Automotive parts
- Production output: 182,200 (2020)
- Services: Automotive financial services
- Parent: Volkswagen AG
- Website: www.vwgroup.ru/en/

Volkswagen Group Rus (Russian: Фольксваген Груп Рус) was a subsidiary of Volkswagen AG, which grew from an investment agreement signed on 29 May 2006. Its main factory was in Kaluga, approximately 170 kilometres (110 mi) southwest of Moscow.

== History ==
The company was established as the official importer for the Volkswagen vehicles in Russia in 2003. On 28 November 2007 production started with semi-knocked-down assembly of Škoda Octavia and Volkswagen Passat vehicles. In April 2008, the Volkswagen Jetta was added; followed by Polo in June 2010. The design of the chassis of the Polo was adapted, and more resistant paints were used specifically to meet Russian requirements; this was the first adaptation of a Volkswagen model to the Russian market.

=== Construction and opening of the Kaluga factory ===
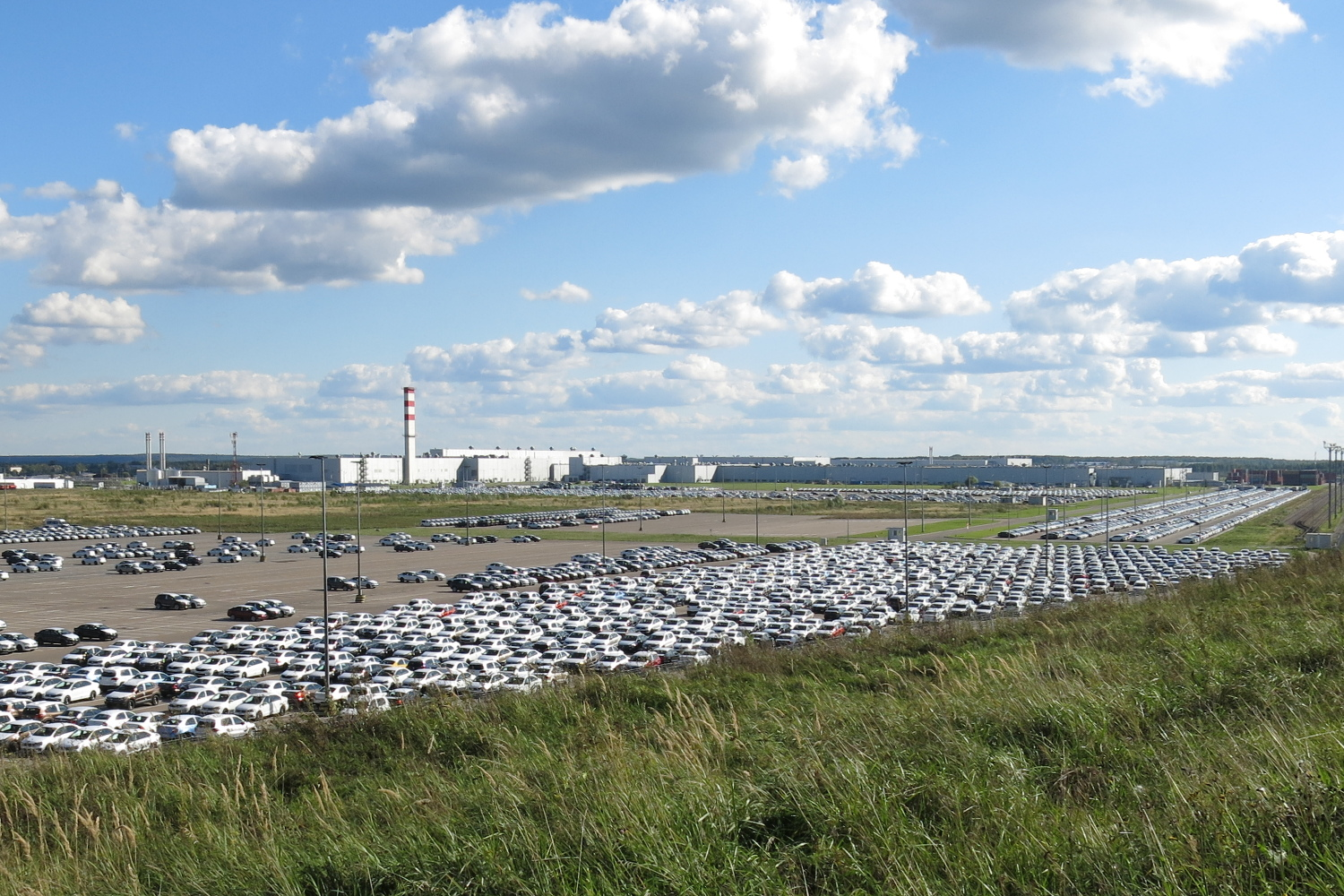
View of the Kaluga factory

The decision to build the plant was made by the executive committee on 26 May 2006. There were more than 70 alternatives to choose from; eventually they chose Kaluga. Present at the opening ceremony were Deputy Prime Minister of the Russian Federation, Sergei Naryshkin, and CEO of Volkswagen AG, Martin Winterkorn. The factory employs 3,000 people, who produced 124,000 vehicles in 2020.

In the first year, the production was 20,000 units, as the construction of the plant was only completed at the beginning of 2009. For the construction of the production site, VW used a total investment of 500 million Euro.

=== Contract manufacture at the Nizhny Novgorod factory ===
With the end of production of automobiles at GAZ, an agreement was signed on 14 June 2011 for contract assembly in Nizhny Novgorod, which was prolonged in June 2017. In 2020, 52,200 VW vehicles were assembled in Nizhny Novgorod.

=== Production ending ===
In 2022, due to the Russian invasion of Ukraine, Volkswagen announced that the Kaluga plant would close and imports would be suspended. The venture with GAZ would also end.

The assets of Volkswagen in Russia were frozen on 20 March 2023 and Volkswagen went out of business in Russia on 22 May 2023, selling its assets to a local dealer.

== Company structure ==
The group is the parent company of Audi Russia, Škoda Group Russia, Volkswagen Russia, Scania Russia and Volkswagen Commercial Vehicles Russia. The headquarters are in the Yugo-Zapadny Administrative Okrug of Moscow.

=== Brands ===
Company management includes an executive team and sales and marketing managers for each of the brands sold in Russia, which include:

- Volkswagen
- Volkswagen Commercial Vehicles
- Audi
- Škoda Auto
- Bentley
- Lamborghini
- Ducati

== Other ==
The vehicle identification number for the Kaluga factory has world manufacturer code XW8 and factory code K in the eleventh position.

The Volkswagen Group Rus was the official partner of the 2014 Winter Olympics in Sochi and provided over 3,000 vehicles for this purpose.
