= Gull egg =

Traditional wild-harvested food

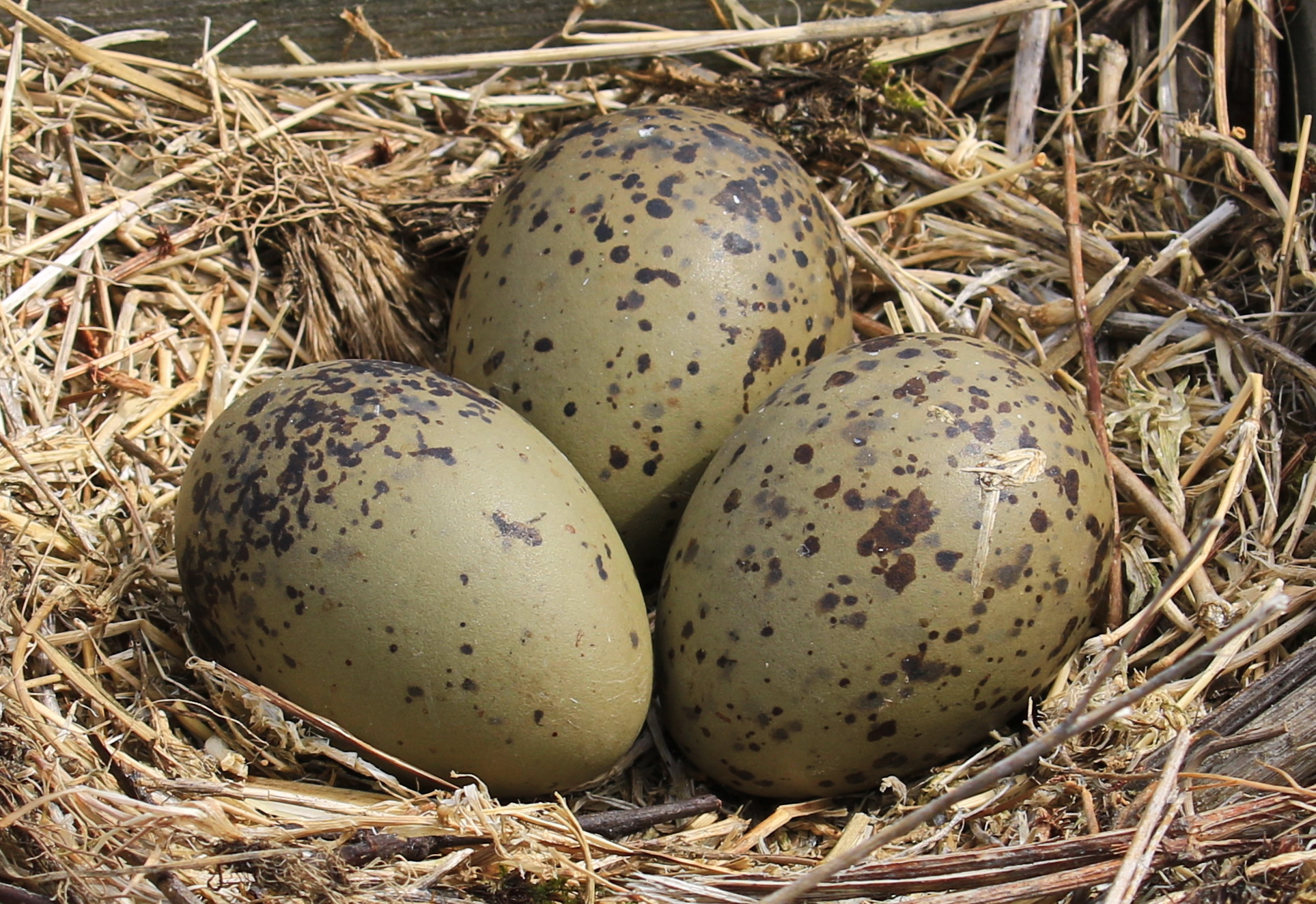
A clutch of three potentially edible gull eggs, photographed 2016 in Norway

Gull eggs, gathered in spring from the nests of wild gulls, are a source or form of eggs as food. Gulls' eggs tend to have speckled shells (which somewhat camouflages them in the landscape), a flavor variously described as fishy or salty that is reminiscent of the birds' marine environment, an especially white or even opalescent albumen when cooked, and almost-red orange yolks. Gull eggs are usually (but not always) larger than any size of chicken egg; for example, a herring-gull egg typically weighs about 85 g (3.0 oz). (Note: Black-headed gull eggs are smaller than chicken eggs.) One source states that a generalized gull's egg is approximately twice the size of a chicken's egg.

Egging is the prehistoric practice of foraging wild-bird eggs. Gull egging is practiced (to varying degrees) in several subarctic regions, including in Canada, Alaska, Greenland, Iceland, the Faroe Islands, Norway, Åland, Russia (by indigenous minorities of the north), and the British Isles. Gull eggs are collected from a number of species in the family Laridae, including the black-headed gull, glaucous gull, glaucous-winged gull, the great black-backed gull, Heermann's gull, the various subspecies of herring gull, the laughing gull, the lesser black-backed gull, Sabine's gull, the short-billed gull, and the western gull. Per one pair of zoologists, "Gull eggs are a readily renewable resource in that clutches that are destroyed are replaced." However, this egg production is not without energy demands on individual birds, and thus flocks, and can ultimately affect species-level survival. Gull eggs are also considered "excellent bioindicators of environmental pollution". Toxicologists and public-health agencies recommend that children and pregnant or nursing women avoid eating gull eggs.

Increased egg production by domestic poultry and wild egging have often filled the hungry gap of early spring. In baking, gull eggs are said to increase the airiness of cakes (compared to chicken eggs used in the same way), and to make a "smashing meringue". In some human communities with large populations of fisherfolk, the relationship between egging human and nesting gulls may be considered to be mutualistic, in that humans nourish the gull population with a steady supply of fish guts in exchange for access to occasional or seasonal eggs.

== Europe ==
=== British Isles ===
Gull eggs have long been collected in some quantity in the British Isles and are considered to be a seasonal delicacy in Great Britain. Wild seabird eggs were once taken all along the English Channel. Gull eggs were sometimes used to supplement domestic chicken flocks: when broody hens were determined to incubate and hatch their own eggs—which would eventually allow for the perpetuation of the flock if a cock had recently been present—householders could instead collect wild gulls' eggs. British farmers would also harvest gull eggs to both reduce the populations of gulls they considered pestilential and for use as nitrogen and calcium-rich fertilizer for their fields. One account has it that in primeval times, the first clutches were all smashed in a day, prompting the gull colony to lay again en masse, so that harvesters could return within a week and be guaranteed of fresh eggs. According to a 1906 account, after gull nesting began in March, the first two clutches laid in the fens and salt marshes of England were taken for consumption or sale, and the third clutch was left untouched for the gull hen to set, "elsewise she and her kind would never set foot in the marsh again." In May 1912, two young men in Fife, Scotland, were charged with illegally possessing seven eider duck (genus Somateria) eggs, in violation of the Wild Birds Protection Act 1880. The men also had, at the time of their arrest, perfectly legal possession of 654 gull eggs. Two decades later a letter to a Scottish newspaper described gull egging on a loch; eggs were "lifted from their dangerously placed nests by means of a table spoon attached to a long pole."

During World War I, the British government recommended collecting gull eggs as a supplement to limited supplies of hen's eggs. The official suggestion was that the eggs be boiled and "eaten cold". The government also issued Food Production Leaflet No. 30, which offered "special guidance for collecting gull eggs". On the World War II homefront, when chicken eggs were again in short supply in the United Kingdom (due to food rationing), wild-harvested gull eggs became a popular substitute. The visually similar eggs of the black-headed gull (Chroicocephalus ridibundus) had long been used as a fraudulent counterfeit for luxury plover eggs (although there were ongoing debates about distinctions in flavor), and thus gull-egg market networks were already in place, such as the 20,000 gull eggs taken annually from Scoulton Mere in Norfolk. Immediately after the end of World War II, Rupert Baring, 4th Baron Revelstoke sold over 100,000 gull eggs a year to British city dwellers. In 1948, some 50,000 gull eggs were harvested from the Colne Estuary's Rat Island and shipped to market in London, leaving the island's gull hens to sit on just 13 eggs in five nests.

Gull egging is now strictly regulated in the United Kingdom, although gull-egg piracy has been documented, including at Holmfirth, West Yorkshire, Poole Harbour, Dorset, and on the Copeland Islands off Northern Ireland. There are fewer than 100 licensed gull eggers in the UK, and only licensed eggers are permitted to collect a limited number of gull eggs from a limited number of sites for a limited number of days. Since the mid-20th century the London market for wild bird eggs has largely been filled by the eggs of the black-headed gull, in large part because the market is haunted by the ghost of plover's eggs. Black-headed gulls' eggs have long been collected off the marshlands of Northumberland. In the 2000s decade, some 10,000 gull eggs were taken annually from a property in the Scottish Borders. Harvesting gull eggs on the Solent is said to benefit Sandwich terns (Thalasseus sandvicensis) that would otherwise suffer from predation and defensive behaviors by nesting gulls; removing the gull eggs prompts replacement laying behaviors and postpones anti-tern antics for three crucial weeks.

In 1997, there were 35 licensed collectors who provided 54,000 gull eggs for the British market. In 2016, there were but 18 licensed gull eggers, and a single legally acquired black-headed gull egg went for as much as £10 (equivalent to £13.72 in 2025). In 2023, it was reported that over 160,000 black-headed gull eggs had been collected under licence since 2019, leading conservation organizations such as the Royal Society for the Protection of Birds (RSPB) and the Yorkshire Wildlife Trust to call for an end to gull egging, citing instances when Mediterranean gull (Ichthyaetus melanocephalus) eggs were taken illegally from the Poole Harbour gullery by unlicensed egg collectors. Mediterranean gulls and black-headed gulls look much alike, but the rarer Mediterranean gulls are on the RSPB's Amber List, indicating there is concern about their local conservation status. Similarly, Science & Advice for Scottish Agriculture (SASA) notes that oystercatcher (genus Haematopus) nests may superficially resemble gull nests, but outlines some visible differences and reminds householders that moving or destroying oystercatcher nests and/or eggs is illegal.

A black-headed gull's egg is the size of a bantam hen's egg. When purchased "in bulk", 20 black-headed gull eggs are roughly equivalent in food volume to a dozen standard chicken eggs. London restaurants and gentleman's clubs frequently serve gull eggs soft-boiled, seasoned with celery salt or paired with the spring vegetable asparagus. Circa 1971, Irston R. Barnes, an economist and former chairman of the American Audubon Society, wrote that the taste of London-restaurant gull eggs was unremarkable except for a faintly oily quality. In 1993, British chef and food writer Hugh Fearnley-Whittingstall found gulls' eggs to be more or less undistinguished in flavor compared to ordinary chicken eggs. He did, however, find them visually pleasing and enhanced by the "indubitable aphrodisiac of price".

=== Scandinavia ===
The only enemies that the gull has, besides nature, are themselves and, in the spring, human beings. Gull eggs taste as good as their bodies do foul. Egg-hunting was the duty of the women and the children, and no duty was ever performed with lighter hearts.

— Erik Christian Haugaard, Hakon of Rogen's Saga (1963)

Gull eggs are sold in shops in Norway. Norwegians often pair gull eggs with Mack beer, which is called Mack-øl og måseegg. There are concerns about collectors mistakenly harvesting eggs from the vulnerable black-legged kittiwake (Rissa tridactyla). The Norwegian Food Safety Authority discourages the consumption of gull eggs by children, and women who could become pregnant, due to unsafe levels of toxic compounds including polychlorinated biphenyl (PCB) and dioxins. In Svalbard, seabird egging is generally prohibited but the "Governor of Svalbard may issue special permits to allow egg collecting" from the common eider duck (Somateria mollissima), great black-backed gull (Larus marinus), and glaucous gull (Larus hyperboreus). Seabird egging has been banned in mainland Finland since 1962. In Iceland it is legal to harvest eggs from black-headed, great black-backed, lesser black-backed (Larus fuscus), herring (Larus argentatus argenteus), and glaucous gulls' nests through 1 June.

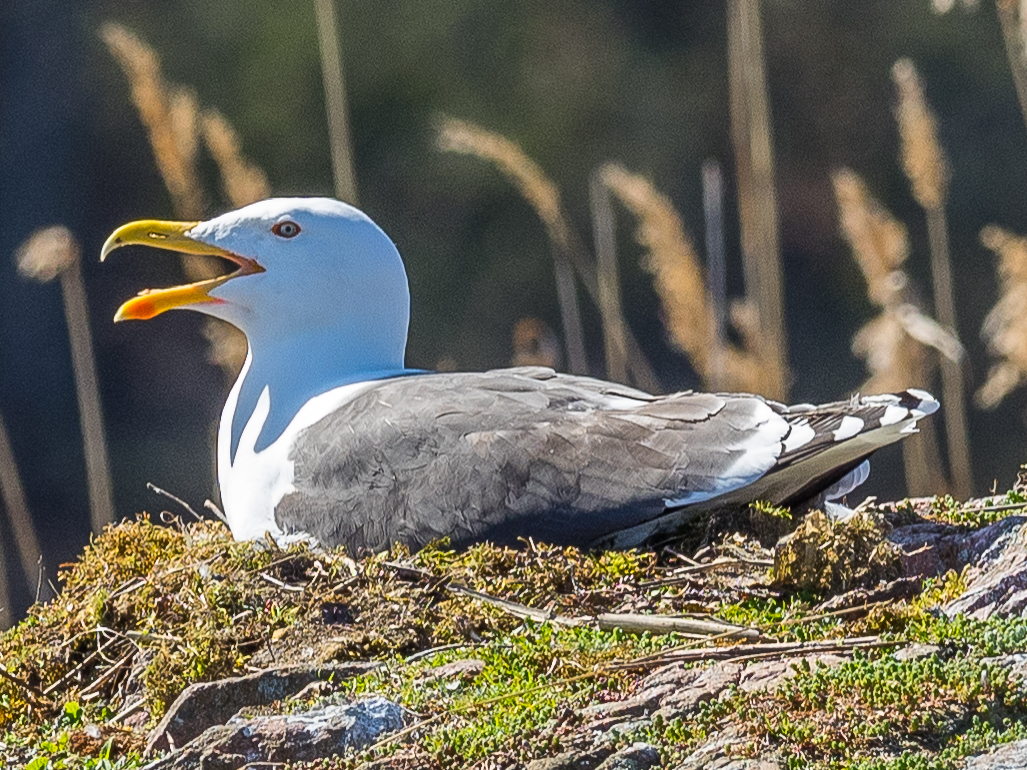
Great black-backed gull (Larus marinus) sitting on a nest of eggs in Sweden in 2016

== North America ==
For personal use, Greenland permits collection of great black-backed gull eggs until 31 May each year. Glaucous-gull eggs can be harvested until 15 June. Those collecting gull eggs to sell at the kalaaliaraq markets must first purchase a hunting license.

American herring gull (Larus smithsonianus) eggs were historically collected in the eastern provinces of Canada, sometimes preserved for the remainder of the year in waterglass. The Ahousat and Anaham First Nations of British Columbia, Canada, also harvest wild gull eggs. One Ahousat family goes gull egging three times over the course of one week in June, and usually takes one of the three eggs laid in each nest.

Native Alaskans have long collected the eggs of the glaucous-winged gull (Larus glaucescens) when seasonally available from mid-May to mid-June each year. However, by the 1960s, the U.S. National Park Service had prohibited this indigenous practice within what had historically been Tlingit tribal lands. Then, more 50 years after the annual collections were disrupted, the Huna Tlingit Traditional Gull Egg Use Act, passed into law by the U.S. federal government in 2014, reauthorized gull-egg collection at five locations within Glacier Bay National Park by Tlingit people. Frank Wright Jr., president of the Hoonah Indian Association, said of the practice, "The elders need their traditional foods, because happiness heals." Iñupiat would use one gull egg in place of two chicken eggs when baking. Yup'ik people also participate in managed harvests of seabird and gull eggs. According to an Edible magazine account of a Yup'ik egg hunt, "Once in awhile, an egg will be harvested after having been incubated for several days. These yolks have a thick texture of custard and the whites will be runny when boiled." Gull eggs collected on the coast of Alaska may be used in "tricked-out" boxed-cake-mix cakes that are popular in Alaskan communities.

Egging without a permit is illegal in the contiguous United States under various federal laws including the Lacey Act of 1900, the Migratory Bird Treaty Act of 1918, and the Endangered Species Act of 1969. (Note: Some introduced species, including house sparrows and starlings, are exempt from these protections.) In the 19th century, Western gull eggs (Larus occidentalis) were taken on the Farallones off San Francisco for personal consumption, and at the beginning of the annual season, before other seabirds' eggs became widely available. On balance, however, gull eggs were considered a fragile, unreliable product compared to the preferred murre (Uria aalge) eggs that were to be the ultimate prize of the Egg War. Heermann's gull (Larus heermanni) eggs have been harvested from the islands of Baja California, Mexico.

== See also ==
- Hunter-gatherer – Peoples who forage or hunt for most or all of their food
- List of edible invasive species
- Muttonbirding – Seasonal harvesting of petrel chicks
- Norwegian cuisine – Culinary traditions of Norway
- Oölogy – Branch of ornithology studying bird eggs, nests and breeding behavior
- Quail eggs – Egg dish
- Yup'ik cuisine – Culinary traditions of Yup'ik people
