= Quail as food =

Type of meat

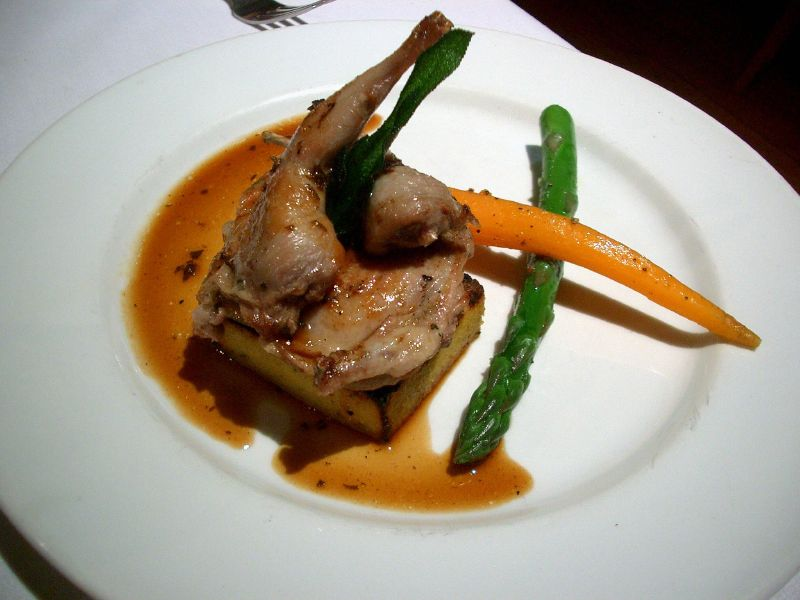
Quail with sauce

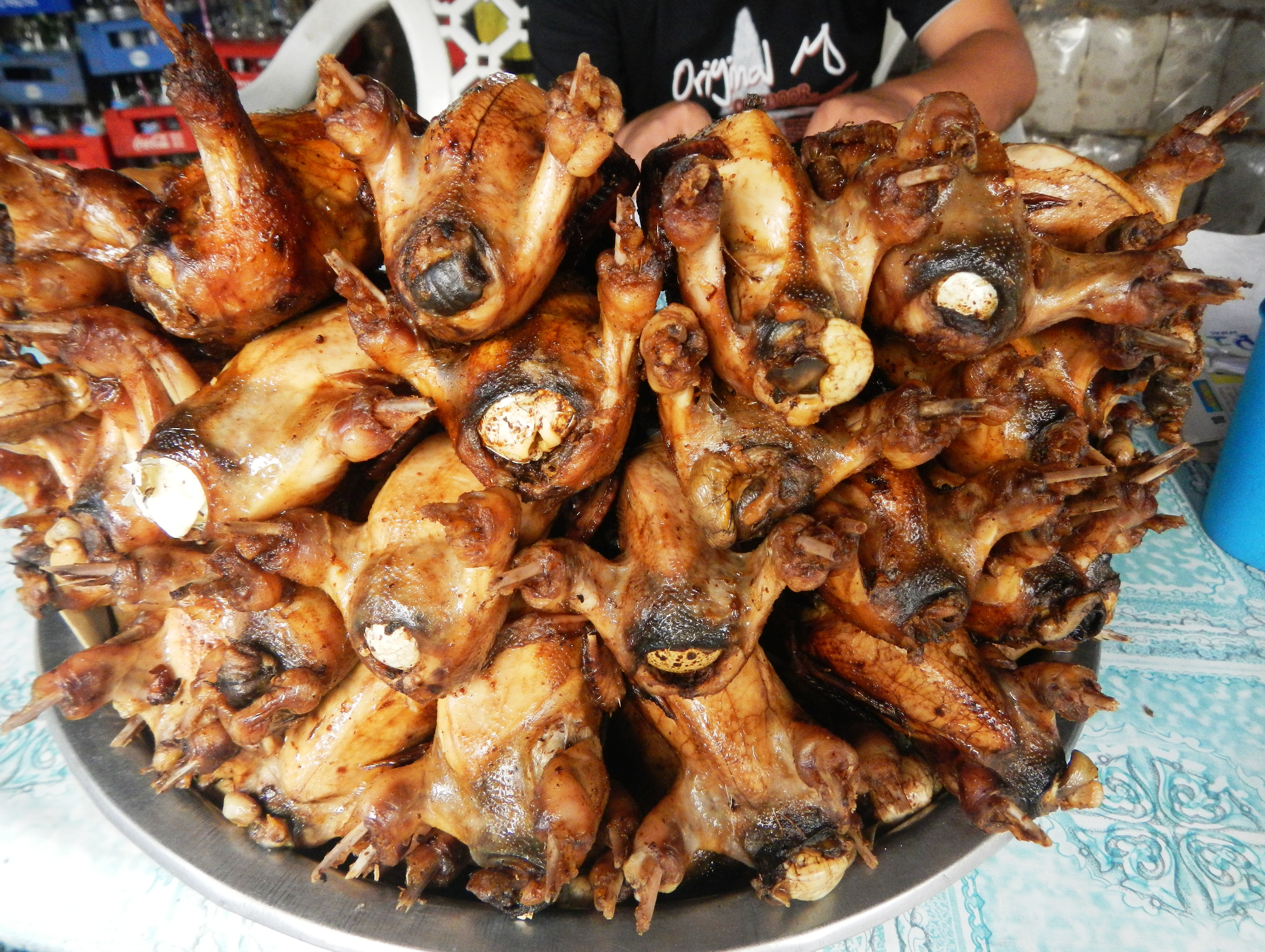
Fried quail with inserted quail eggs in the Philippines

Both Old World and New World quail include edible species. The common quail used to be much favoured in French cooking, but quail for the table are now more likely to be domesticated Japanese quail. The common quail is also part of Polish, Maltese, Italian, Mexican, Spanish, Egyptian and Indian cuisines. Quail are commonly eaten complete with the bones, since these are easily chewed and the small size of the bird makes it inconvenient to remove them. Quails were domesticated in China. China is also the largest producer of quail meat in the world.

Quail meat can be toxic with symptoms similar to rhabdomyolysis after consumption. This is referred to as coturnism. It was assumed that this was due to quail having fed on hemlock (e.g., during migration), but hemlock is not necessary for quail being poisonous, and other food sources have been proposed and the reason is unclear. The toxicity of quail meat is limited to certain geographic regions and the migration direction of the quail.

A persistent assumption holds that it is impossible to eat quail every day for a month. This has been the subject of a number of proposition bets; however, it has been achieved on several occasions.

== In history ==
Quails were eaten back in ancient times. In the letter of Shepsi to his mother, one of the Egyptian letters to the dead, he wrote reminding her of all the good deeds he performed during her lifetime. saying … you said to me, your son, “you shall bring me some quails that I may eat them” and I, your son, then brought you seven quails and you ate them …,

A 19th-century recipe from California for Codornices a la española (Spanish-style quail) was prepared by stuffing quails with a mixture of mushrooms, green onion, parsley, butter, lemon juice and thyme. The birds were brushed with lard, bread crumbs and beaten eggs and finished in the oven. A savory pie could be made with quail, salt pork, eggs and fresh herbs.

== Kosher status ==
Only certain species of quail are considered kosher. The Orthodox Union certifies Coturnix coturnix as kosher based upon the masorah of Rabbi Shlomo Zev Zweigenhaft.

== See also ==
- Quail eggs
