= Plover eggs =

Archaic wild-harvested food

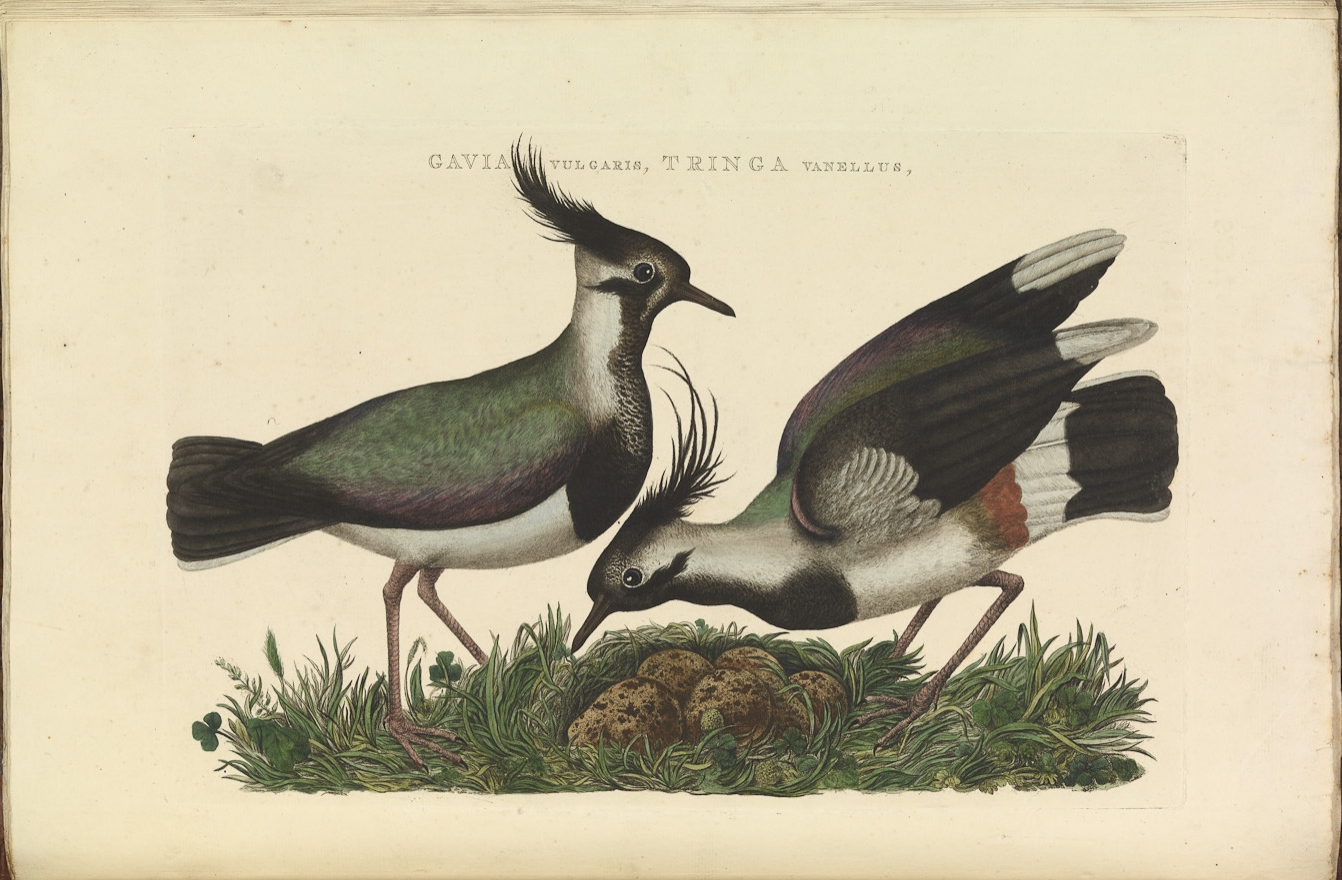
Northern lapwing (Vanellus vanellus) mating pair and nest, 18th or 19th century illustration from the Netherlands

Plover eggs were a form of eggs as food, and a seasonal delicacy of western Europe. Gathered from wild green-plover nests, a practice called plover egging, these eggs were perceived to be particularly flavorful and were snatched up by avid rural foragers and, in turn, their urban customers, as soon as nesting season began each year. In the manorial accounts of Nathaniel Bacon of Stiffkey in Norfolk, there is an entry in the 3 months to 24 March 1593 for 9 shillings paid "to Lodes & Tayler for 12 daies worke in makeinge of neaces {niches} for pewetes at Langham water", suggesting that plover egg collecting was here a commercial activity. The ground-nesting green plover is more formally the northern lapwing, binomial name Vanellus vanellus. Golden plover (Pluvialis apricaria) nests were egged when they could be found.

According to British forager and food writer Hugh Fearnley-Whittingstall, for the better part of a century, from the age of Victoria until the coming of the Second World War, plover eggs were "the sine qua non of the society picnics of the early Summer Season." In 1977, New York Times food writer Craig Claiborne mentioned plover eggs as a luxury foodstuff in the rarefied company of truffles, cockscomb, foie gras, caviar, and "nightingale's tongue." Plover eggs are called œufs de pluvier in French, and regenvogel-eier in German.

== History ==
In the late 19th century, from March through May each year, plover eggs were sold in "enormous quantities" at "extraordinary" prices in London and other major cities of Britain. Plover eggs were said to have a flavor of "supreme delicacy." When unavailable in England, supplies came from Scotland, Ireland, and the Netherlands, and when genuine plover eggs were unavailable, fake plover eggs were sometimes passed into the market. Redshank and seabird eggs were said to be the most convincing counterfeits, and if nothing else was available a quick paint job of any eggs approximately the right size might do the trick. Seagull's eggs, especially the eggs of black-headed gulls, had the right look but one writer claimed "an epicure must at once detect the difference in flavor." True lapwing eggs are "pear-shaped" with a buff background and black speckles. Another source described them as "olive-brown, spotted and dashed at the larger end with a darker umber color." In the 1920s, "nice little moss-covered baskets with spotted green eggs" were served at fine restaurants and hotels.

One 1934 newspaper in West Lothian, Scotland wrote about plover egging, and an apparent decline in the regional population of lapwings:

...our native lapwings are found in very small numbers when compared with a past generation. Long ago all marsh lands gave local employment in gathering plovers' eggs for the London epicures. From an old diary I note that one man in Norfolk alone sent away between 500 and 600 eggs weekly during March, April, and May.

A Shropshire gamekeeper's son wrote a memoir of his childhood, spent hunting and foraging the Long Mynd, in which he described the annual process of plover egging. Come spring, London retailer Fortnum & Mason would send their family empty wooden crates, each meant to hold 36 eggs.

Plovers always nested on the drier spots using mole hills to use for their scratching (scrapes) or nests. If the hen had started to sit the eggs would all be in a circle, pointing in, they were no use for eating and were left to hatch. The eggs we would collect would be on sale in London the next day. As with oysters, eaten raw. Our reputation at Fortnum & Mason relied on freshness, a definite must. Daily on our way home from school [we hunted for eggs]. At home, a bit of Ahub's fine sawdust in the boxes, eggs placed in always pointing the same way, looking most professional...Fortnum's always paid by postal order but we never saw any of the money, it all went into Mother's rainy-day fund to pay for the material to make all our clothes or buy shoes.

— Bill Tuer, A Prince Among Poachers (2004)

Despite Tuer's claim that plover's eggs were always eaten raw, Escoffier has several recipes for cooked plover eggs. Boiling them seems to have been particularly common. Another source says plover's eggs were typically served as hors d'oeuvres. An 1802 British cookery book recommended two possible approaches: "Boil them 20 minutes, and when they are cool, peel and wipe them dry; then lay them in a dish, and put chopped savory jelly round and between them, with slices of lemon and bunches of pickled barberries round the rim of the dish. Or they may be served, either peeled or not, in ornamental paper or wax baskets, with picked parsley under them; or they may be sent to table hot in a napkin."

During World War I, a British newspaper writer suggested that citizens supplement their limited wartime diets with plover eggs, gull eggs, jackdaw eggs, and moorhen eggs. After World War II, gull's eggs filled the niche once occupied by plover's eggs, which had become harder to obtain because of diminishing lapwing populations and increased regulation. In 1955, the American magazine The Atlantic quoted a Londoner about the transition: "There were two reasons for plover eggs. They were expensive, and it enraged the nature lovers to have people eating them. Perhaps the same will be true of gull eggs. It’s fun, you know, to stir up the nature lovers every so often."

Collecting wild bird eggs has generally been illegal in the UK since 1954 (although black-headed gull-egg collection is permitted under special licence), although one of several exemptions that existed until 1969 was that plover eggs could legally be collected until April 15 of each year. By the 1970s, once-declining populations of the northern lapwing were said to have made a "splendid recovery." Since the 1990s, Fortnum & Mason, the "epicurean Mecca on Piccadilly," no longer sells wild-bird eggs due to possible inadvertent ecological damage and concerns about illegal egg harvesting.

== Influence ==
This food provides crucial atmospherics in Evelyn Waugh's 1945 novel Brideshead Revisited, wherein "the importance of beauty, good wine, amusing banter, and fresh plover's eggs" serve as central motivations for the main characters.

== See also ==
- List of egg dishes
- Black-headed gull § Uses
- Wildlife law in England and Wales
- Quail eggs
- Oölogy
