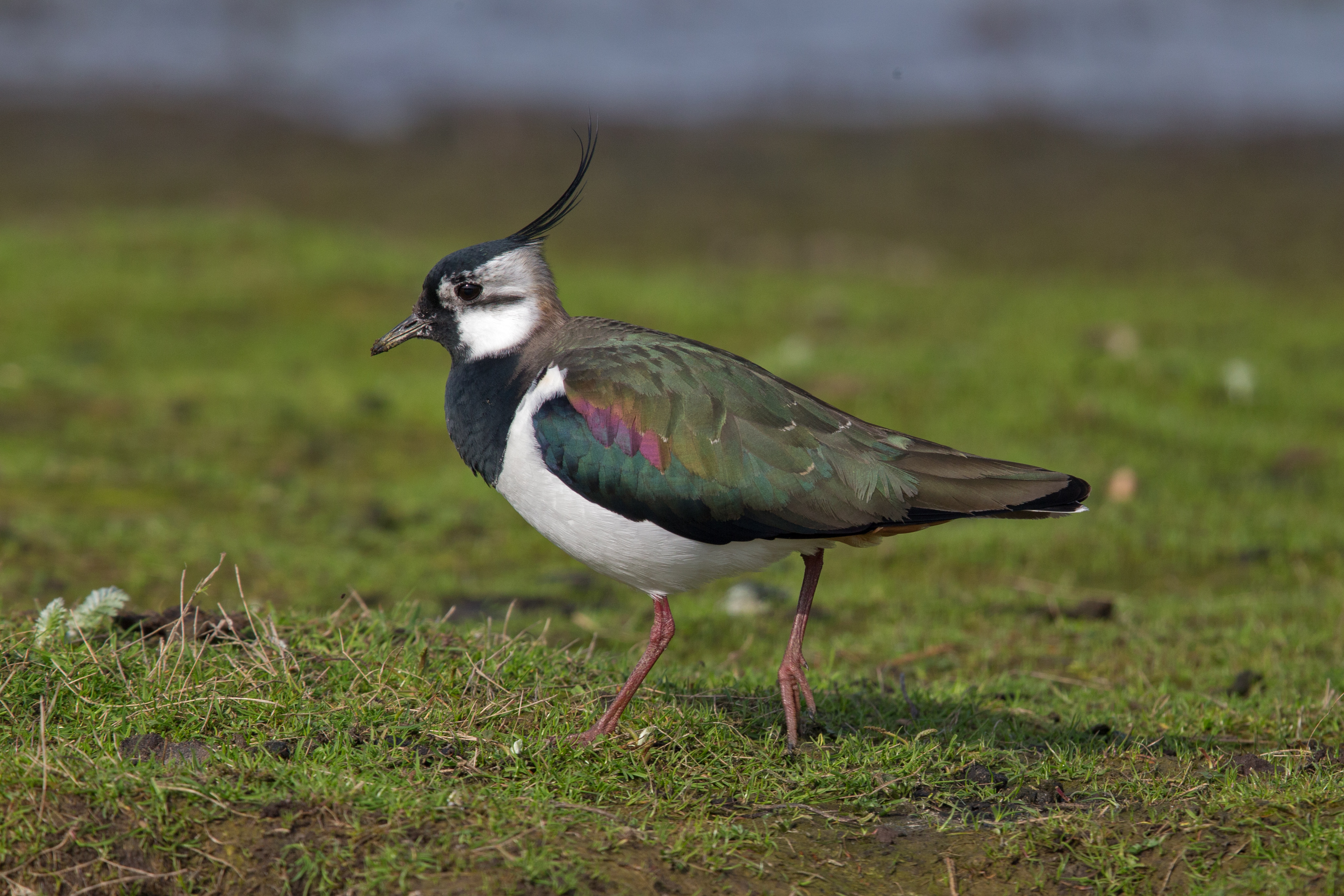
- in Tönning, Germany
- Display calls, Surrey, England

Conservation status
- Near Threatened (IUCN 3.1)

Scientific classification
- Kingdom: Animalia
- Phylum: Chordata
- Class: Aves
- Order: Charadriiformes
- Family: Charadriidae
- Genus: Vanellus
- Species: V. vanellus

Binomial name
- Vanellus vanellus (Linnaeus, 1758)
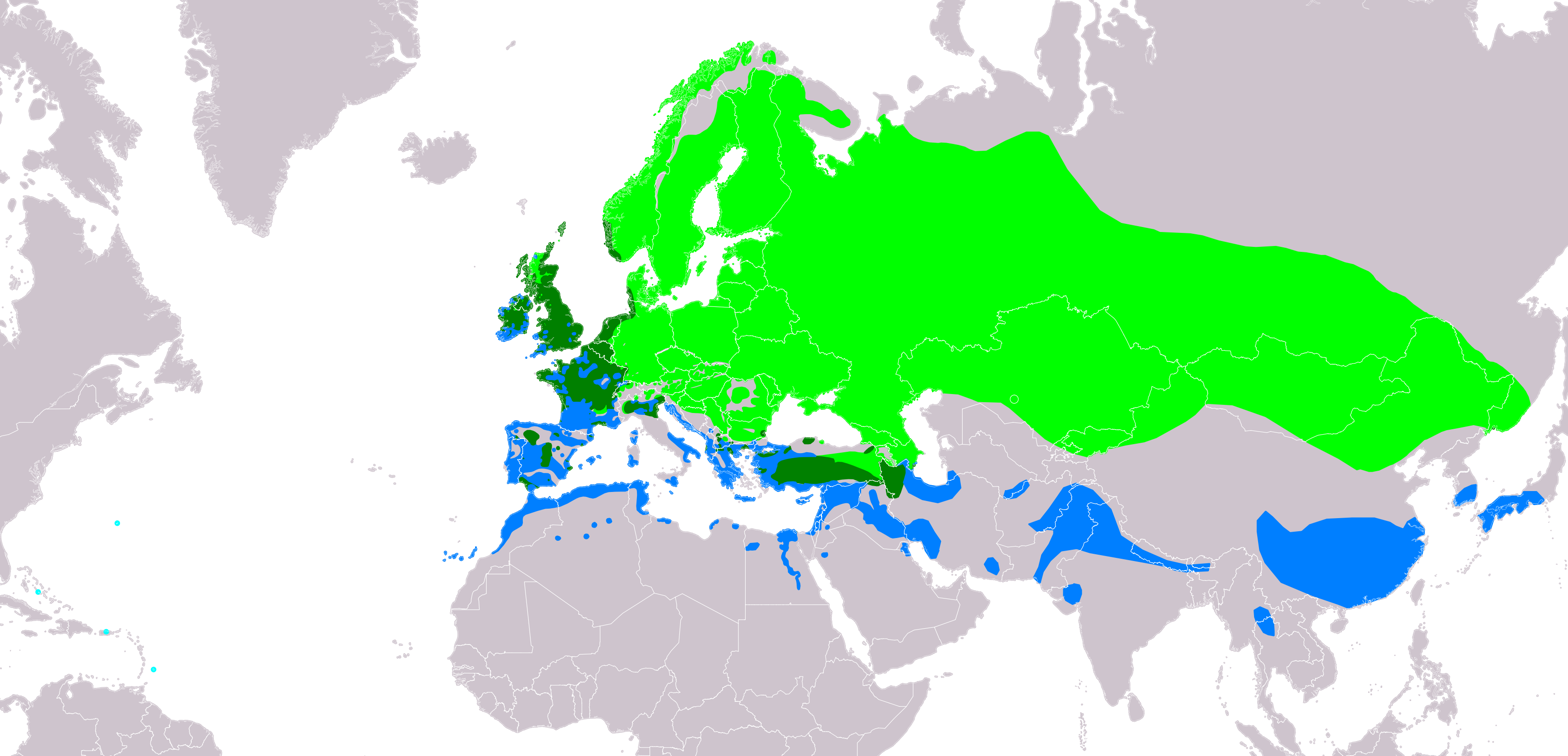
- Northern lapwing distribution. Light green: summer visitor. Dark green: resident. Blue: winter visitor.

Synonyms
- Tringa vanellus Linnaeus, 1758; Vanellus cristatus Meyer; Vanellus vulgaris Bechstein

= Northern lapwing =

Species of bird

The northern lapwing (Vanellus vanellus), also known as the peewit or pewit, tuit or tewit, green plover, or (in Ireland and Great Britain) pyewipe or just lapwing, is a bird in the lapwing subfamily. It is common through temperate Eurosiberia.

== Taxonomy ==
The northern lapwing was formally described by the Swedish naturalist Carl Linnaeus in 1758 in the tenth edition of his Systema Naturae under the binomial name Tringa vanellus. The species is now placed with the other lapwings in the genus Vanellus that was introduced by the French zoologist Mathurin Jacques Brisson in 1760. The scientific name Vanellus is Medieval Latin for the northern lapwing and derives from vannus, a winnowing fan. The species is monotypic: no subspecies are recognised.

The name lapwing has been variously attributed to the "lapping" sound its wings make in flight, to its irregular flight path due to its large wings (the Oxford English Dictionary derives this from an Old English word meaning "to totter"), or from its habit of drawing potential predators away from its nest by trailing a wing as if it were broken. The names peewit, pewit, tuit or tew-it are onomatopoeic and refer to the bird's characteristic call.

== Description ==
The northern lapwing is a 28–33 cm (11–13 in) long bird with a 67–87 cm (26–34 in) wingspan and a body mass of 128–330 g (4.5–11.6 oz). It has rounded wings and a crest. It is also the shortest-legged of the lapwings. Its plumage is mainly black and white, but its back is tinted green. The male has a long crest and a black crown, throat and breast, which contrast with an otherwise white face. Females and young birds have shorter crests and less distinct markings on their heads, but their plumage is otherwise quite similar.

This is a vocal bird during the breeding season, with constant calling while the male performs his crazed tumbling display flight. The typical contact call is a loud, shrill "pee-wit" which gives them their alternative name of peewit. Displaying males usually make a wheezy "pee-wit, wit wit, eeze wit" during their display flight. These birds also make squeaking or mewing sounds.

== Behaviour ==
It is highly migratory over most of its extensive range, wintering as far south as North Africa, northern India, Nepal, Bhutan and parts of China. It migrates mainly by day, often in large flocks. Lowland breeders in most westerly parts of Europe are resident. Occasionally, it is a vagrant to North America, especially after storms, as evidenced by sightings in Canada in December 1927 and in January 1966.

It is a wader that breeds in cultivated areas and other habitats with short vegetation. Three to four eggs are laid in a scrape in the ground. Both the nest and the young are fiercely defended against all intruders, including horses and cattle.

In winter, it forms huge flocks on open land, particularly arable land and mud-flats.

Its diet consists mainly of insects and other small invertebrates. This species often feeds in mixed flocks with golden plovers and black-headed gulls. The latter often rob the two plovers but also provide a degree of protection against predators. They also beat the ground with one leg until worms surface, a technique known as worm charming.

Like the golden plovers, this species prefers to feed at night when there is moonlight.

The northern lapwing is one of the species to which the Agreement on the Conservation of African-Eurasian Migratory Waterbirds (AEWA) applies.

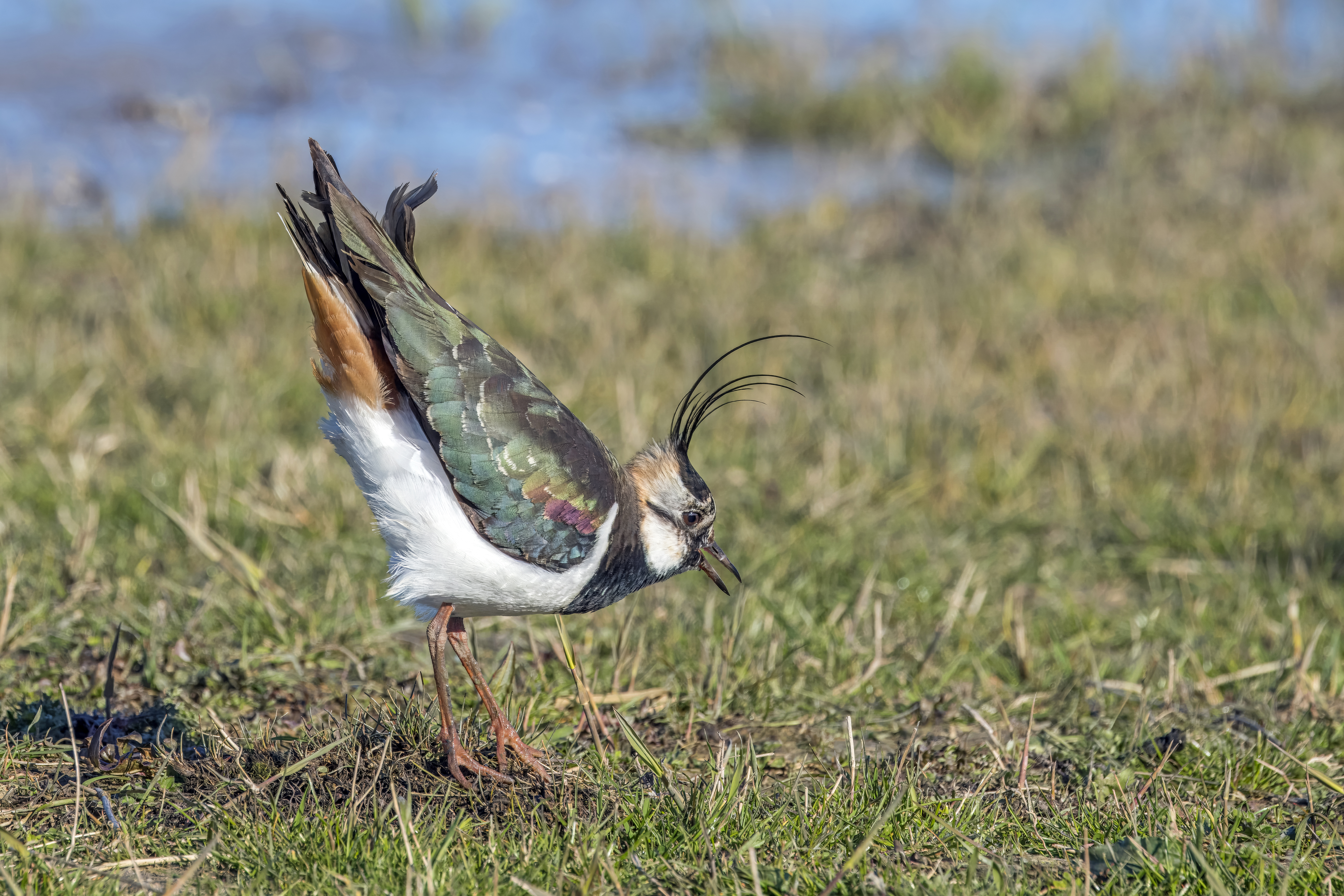
female displaying

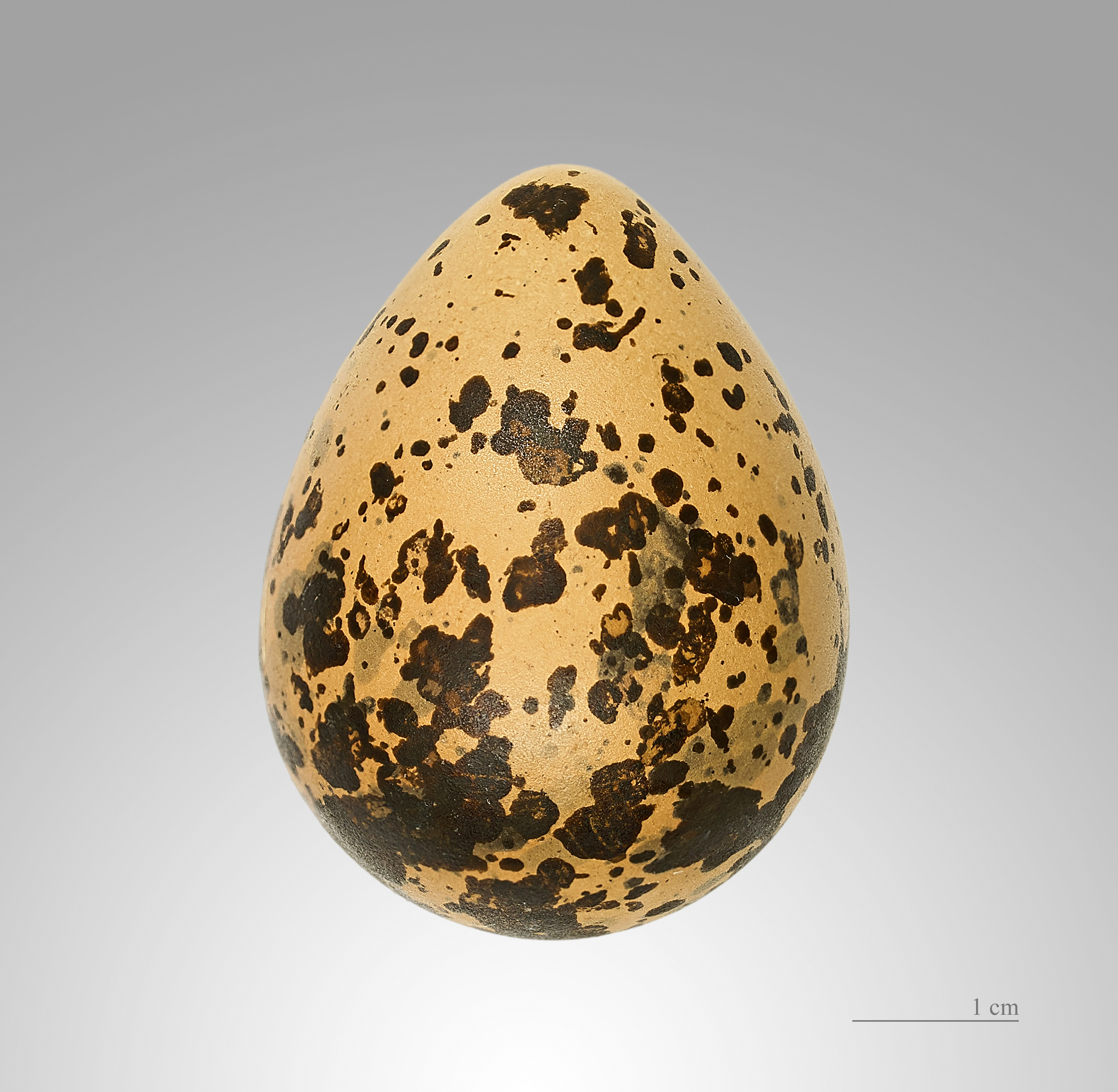
Egg – MHNT

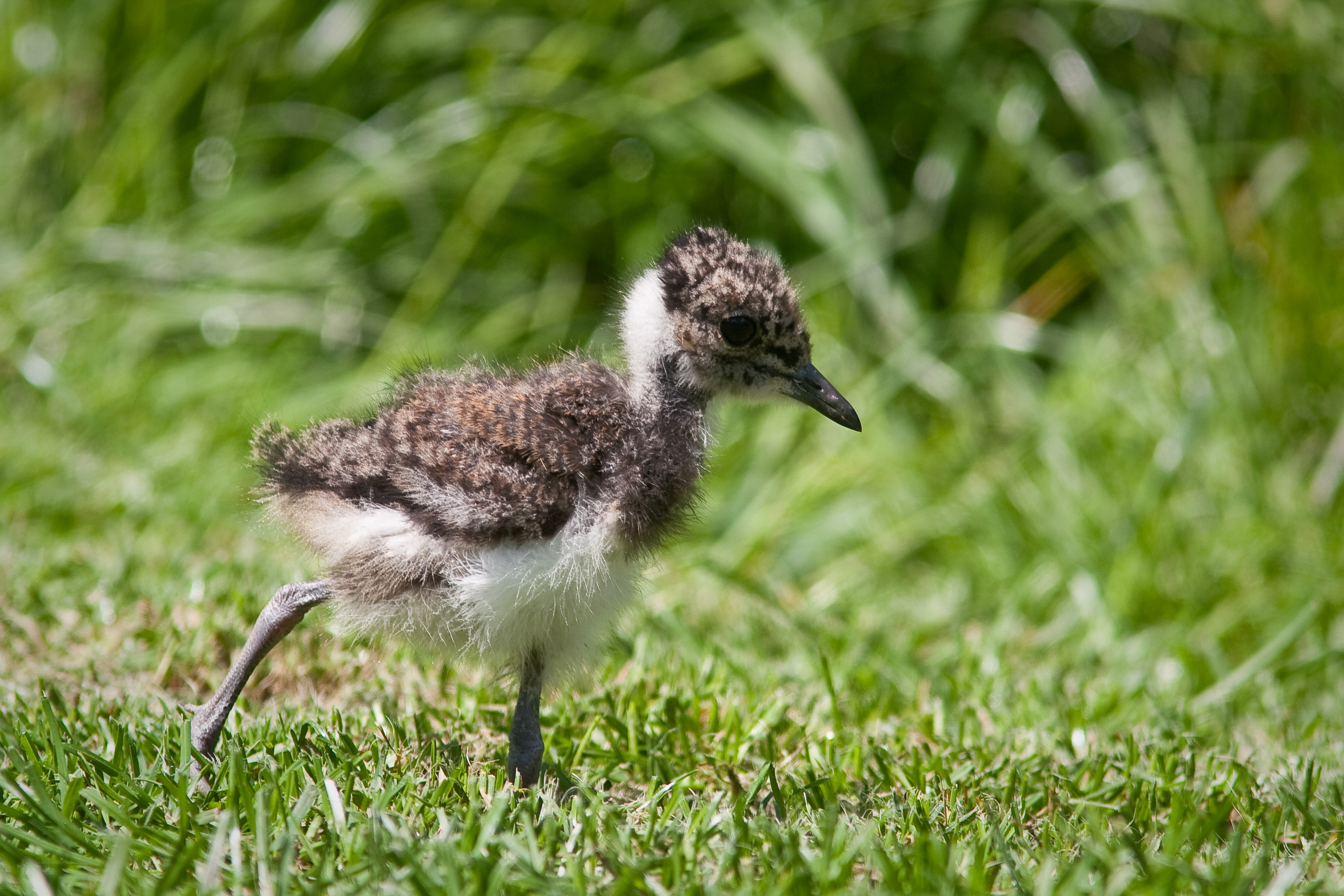
Chick

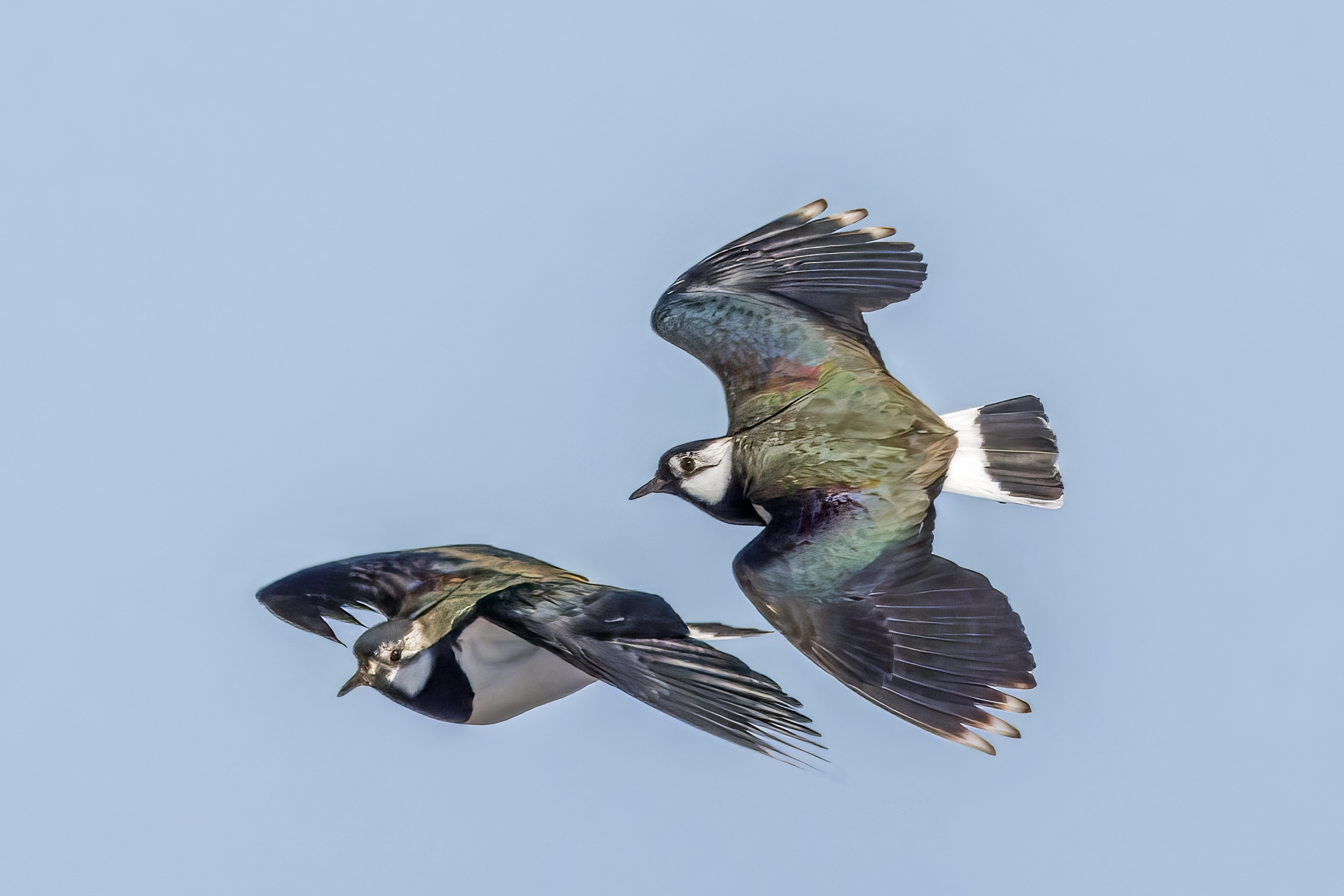

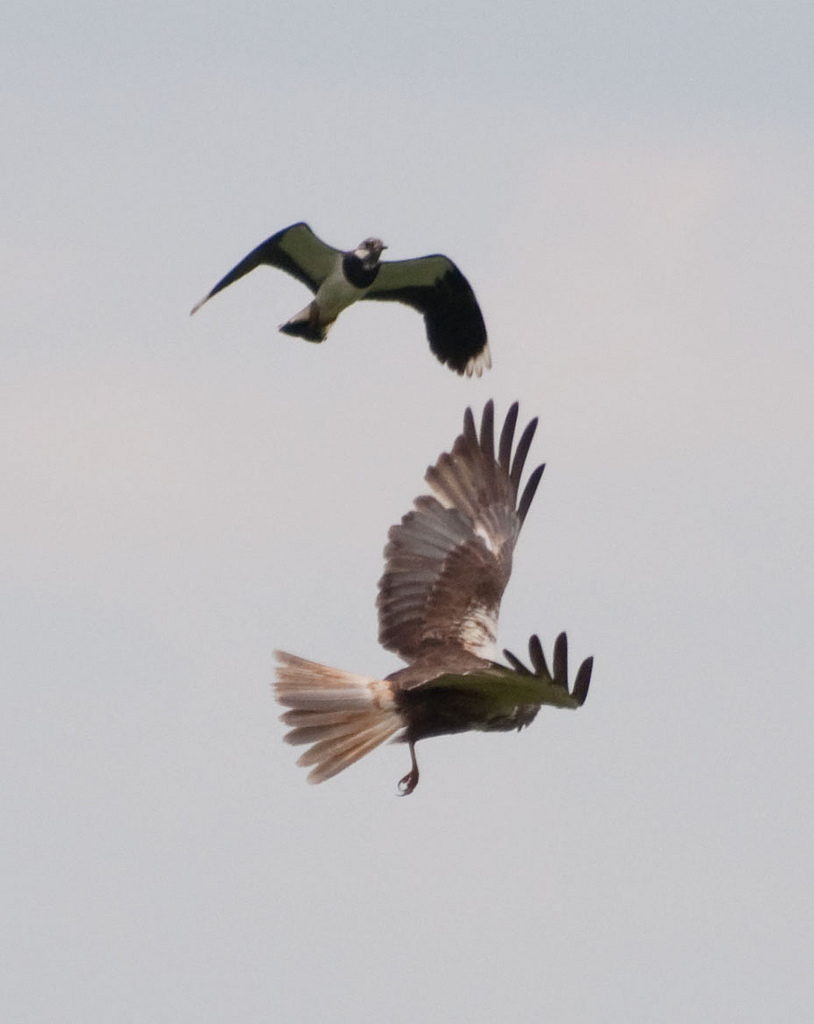
mobbing a western marsh harrier near its nest

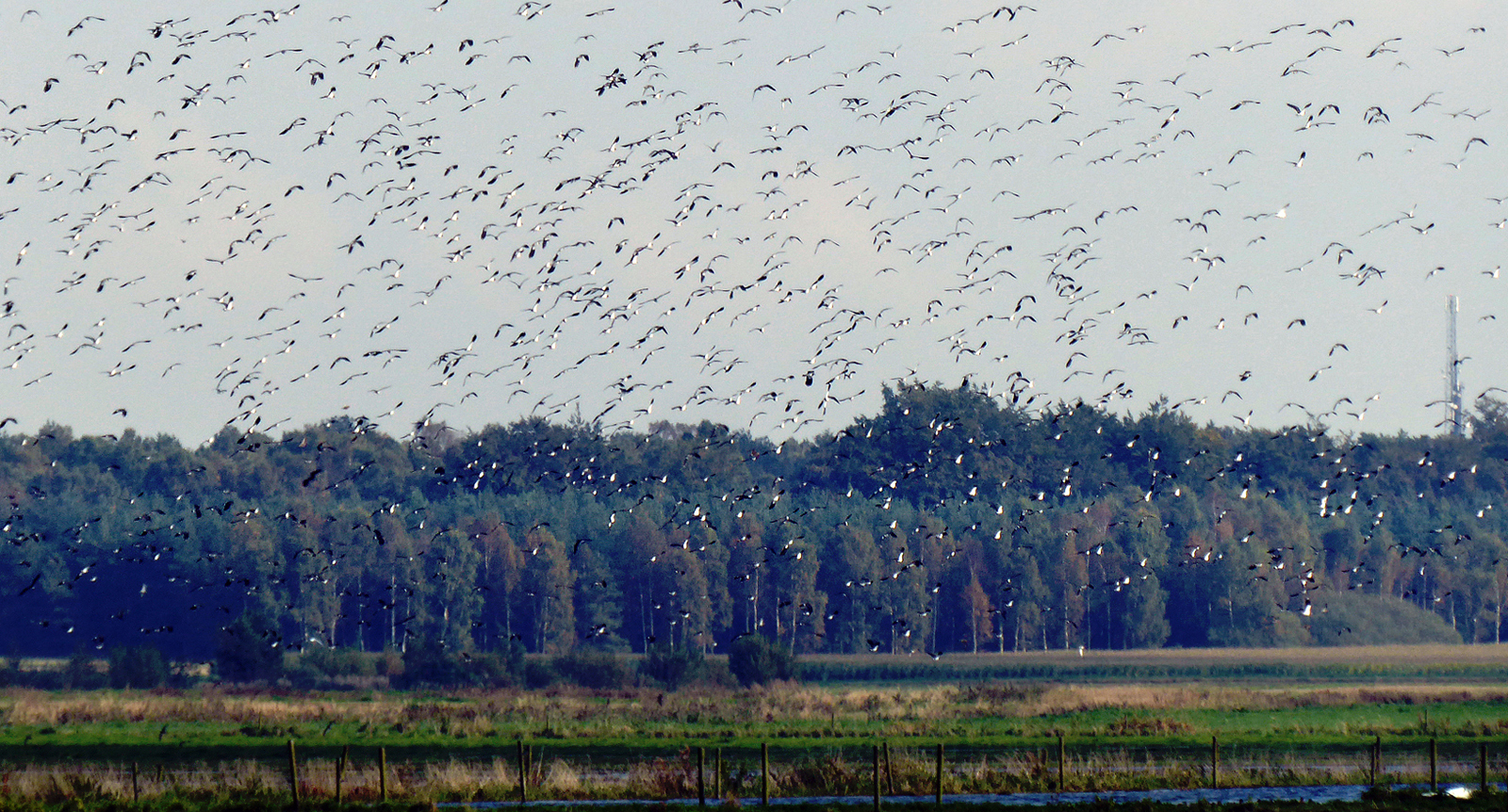
In some years the species is more sociable and gathers in large flocks after breeding.

Alarmed in flowery meadow on Texel

== Population decline ==
National surveys in England and Wales have shown a decline in the population between 1987 and 1998. Since 2009, the northern lapwing has had Red List conservation status in the United Kingdom. Intensive agricultural techniques have had an adverse effect on the numbers of this species. In the lowlands, this includes the loss of rough grassland and its conversion into arable or improved grassland, loss of mixed farms, and switch from spring- to autumn-sown crops. In the uplands, losses may be due to increased grazing density. Natural England provides grant aid to help restore lapwing habitats as part of its Environmental Stewardship Scheme. The organisation suggests an option within this scheme called 'Fallow plots for ground-nesting birds'. Uncropped plots of at least 2 ha (4.9 acres) in size provide nesting habitat and are located in suitable arable fields, which provide additional foraging habitat. Locating the plots within 2 km (1.2 mi) of extensively grazed grassland will provide additional foraging habitat. The plots are cultivated in the spring to produce a rough fallow, which is maintained without the input of fertiliser or pesticides. In addition to agricultural intensification and land-use change, predation of nests and chicks contributes to wader declines, including of lapwing. By radio-tagging lapwing chicks, and using automatic radio tracking systems, the timing of chick predation can be revealed, which provides additional insights into the importance of different predators. Lapwing chicks are predated both in the day and at night, with mammalian predators having the greatest impact.

In Armenia, the decline in population and loss of breeding habitats has also been documented. The threats are thought to be the intensification of land use and hunting, but further investigations are required to clarify the threats. In the Middle East, the northern lapwing is threatened by overhunting, as large numbers of them are along their winter migration routes. Several photos surfacing from the region show large numbers of Northern lapwings alongside other migratory birds, including the threatened European turtle dove and European golden-plover.

== Cultural significance ==
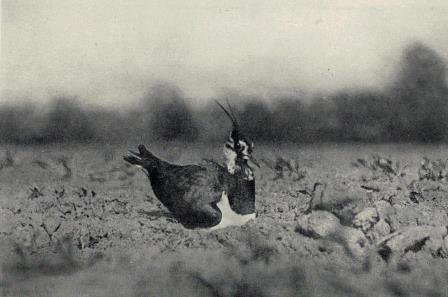
Lapwing Incubating Its Eggs—A photograph for which in 1895 R. B. Lodge received from the Royal Photographic Society the first medal ever presented for nature photography. Eric Hosking and Harold Lowes stated their — incorrect — belief that this was the first photograph of a wild bird. However, Ottomar Anschütz had photographed wild white storks (Ciconia ciconia) in 1884.

=== Harvesting eggs ===
"Plover's eggs" were an expensive delicacy in Victorian Europe, mentioned in Evelyn Waugh's Brideshead Revisited, which is set in 1920s - 1940s British aristocratic society. In the Netherlands, there is a cultural-historical competition to find the first peewit egg of the year (het eerste kievietsei). This is especially popular in the province of Friesland, but there are also regional competitions. Collecting peewit eggs is prohibited by the European Union, but Friesland was granted an exception for cultural and historical reasons. The Frisian exception was removed in 2005 by a court, which determined that the Frisian executive councillors had not properly followed procedure. As of 2006 looking for peewit eggs is permitted between 1 March and 9 April, though harvesting the eggs is now forbidden. In 2008 the first egg was found on 3 March, in Eemnes, Utrecht, and the first egg of 2009 was found on 8 March in Krabbendijke. Over the last century, the first peewit egg has been found earlier and earlier in the year. This is ascribed to both increased use of fertiliser and climate change, causing the growth of grass needed for egg laying to occur earlier.

=== In Ireland ===
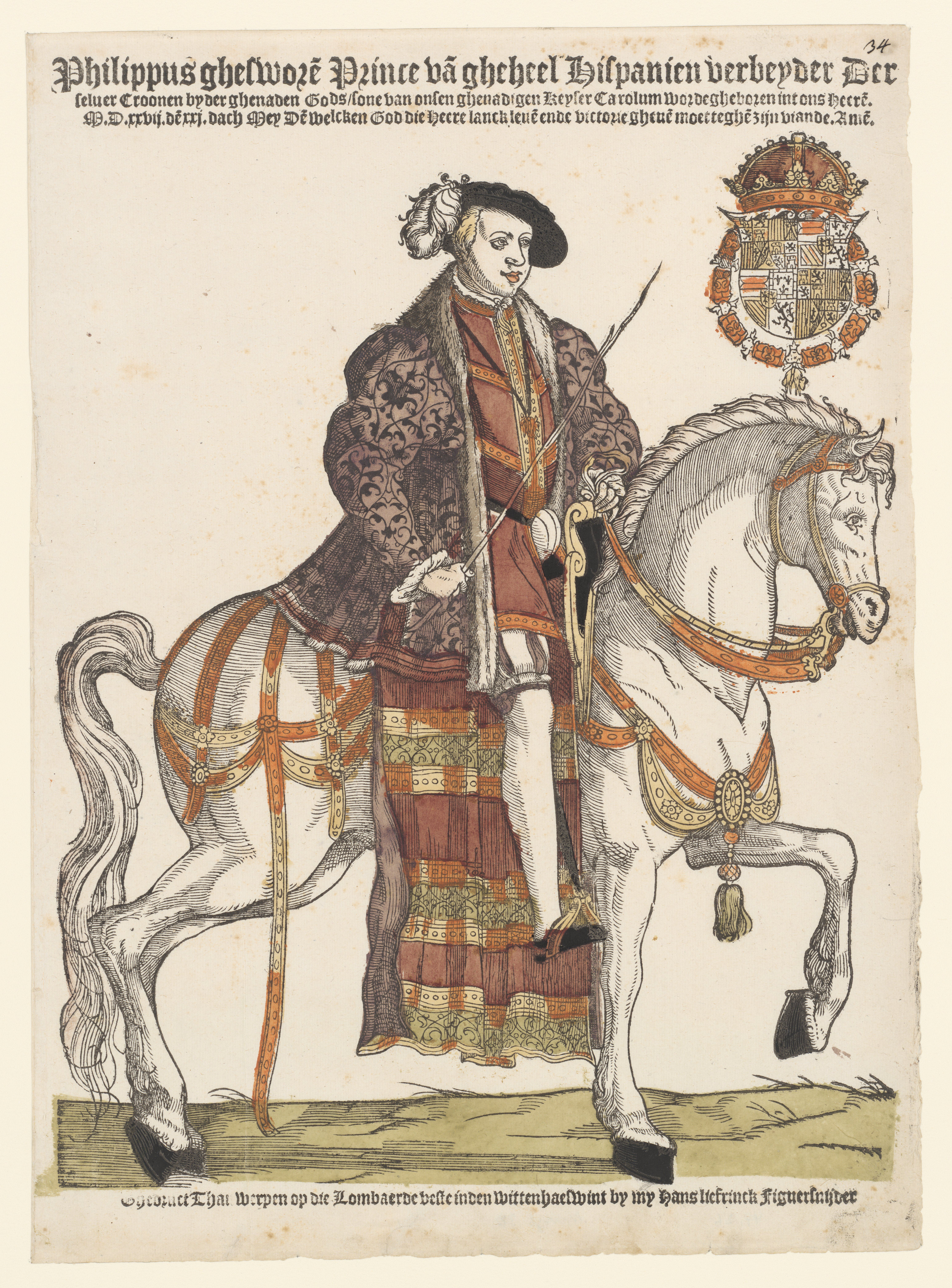
King Philip II with a feather in his cap.

The northern lapwing was declared the Republic of Ireland's national bird by a committee of the Irish Wildlife Conservancy in 1990. In the Irish language it is called pilibín, "little Philip", supposedly a reference to Philip II of Spain (King of Ireland 1554–58), who often wore a feather in his cap.

=== Mythology ===
The bird referred to in English translations of Ovid's Metamorphoses, book 6, as lapwing is probably the northern lapwing. Tereus is transformed into an epops (6.674); Ovid presumably had the hoopoe in mind, whose crest indicates his royal status and whose long, sharp beak is a symbol of his violent nature.
