= Quail eggs =

Egg dish

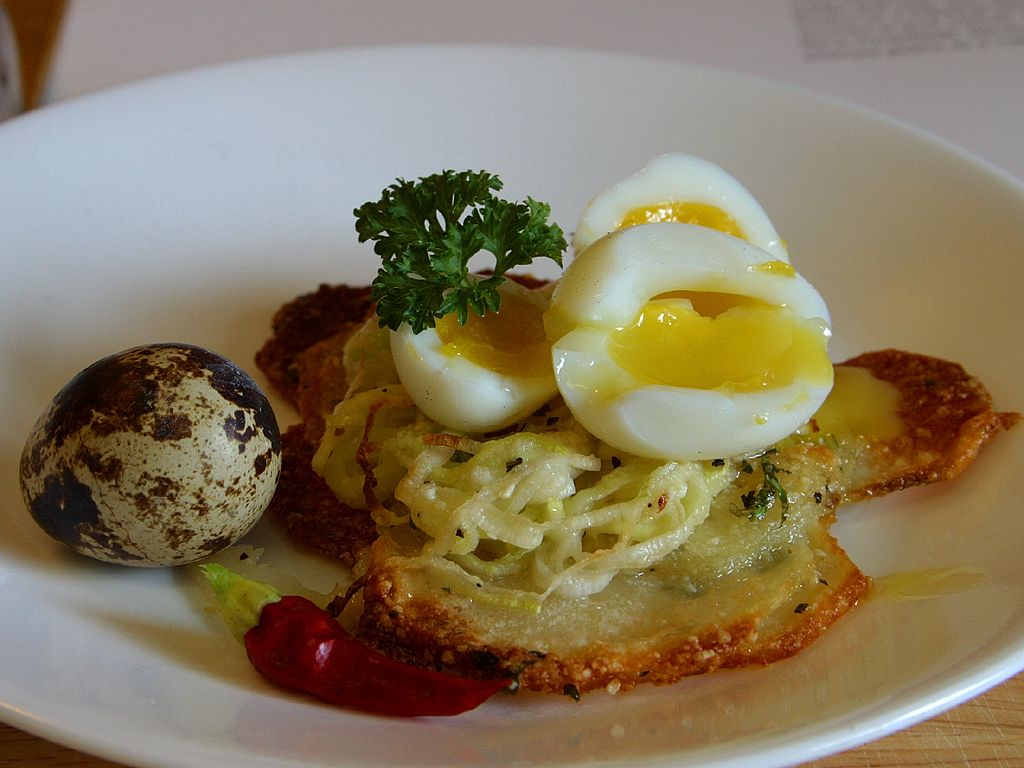
Potato galettes, served with quail eggs

Quail eggs are the eggs of quails, which are edible and widely considered a delicacy. As quails have already been farmed extensively for long, their eggs has also been always readily available and consumed across the world.

== Culinary uses ==
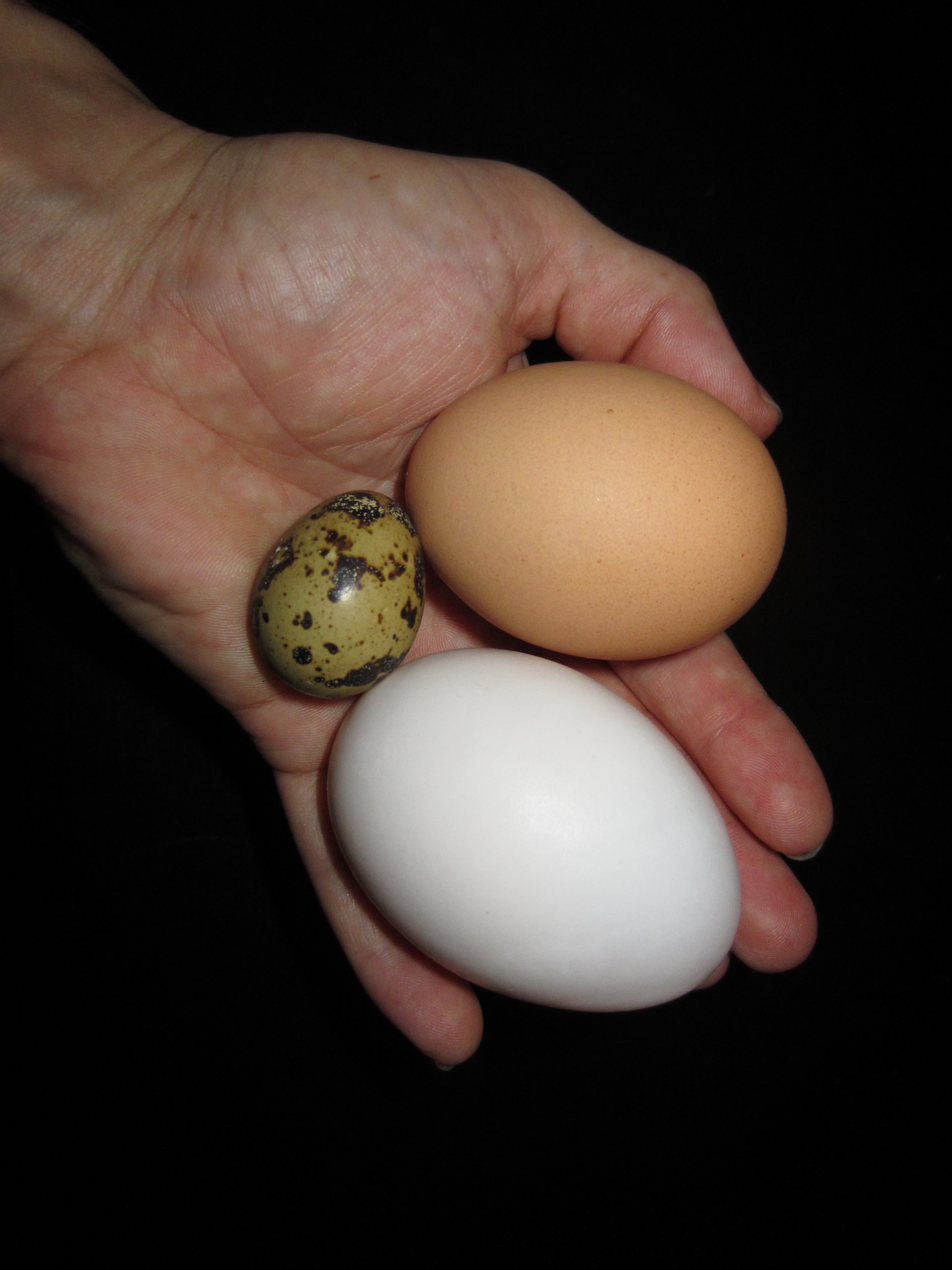
Quail egg (left) as compared to a chicken egg (upper right) and a duck egg (lower right) (the quail egg being the smallest), in an adult human's hand

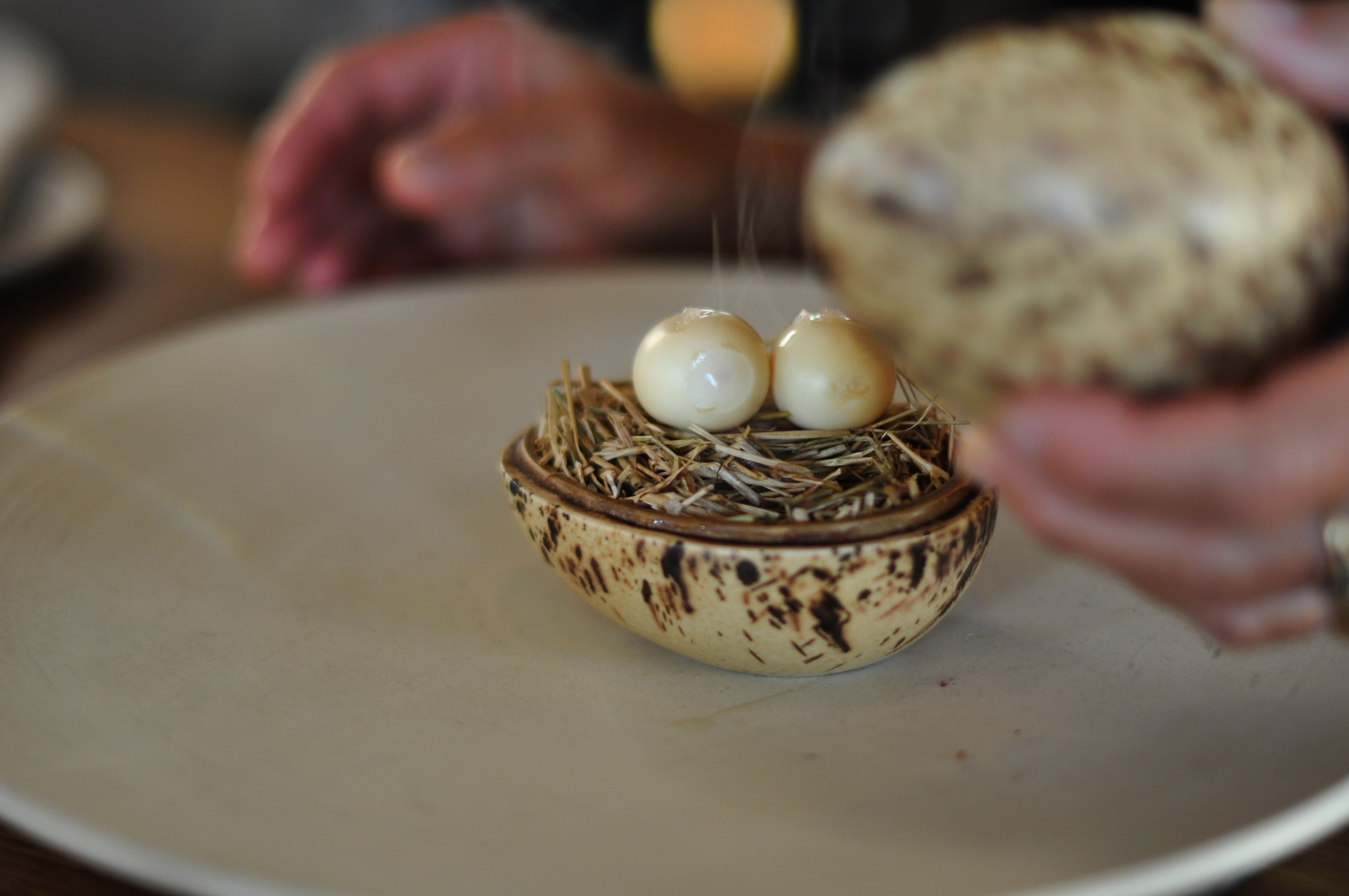
Pickled and smoked quail eggs at Noma restaurant in Copenhagen

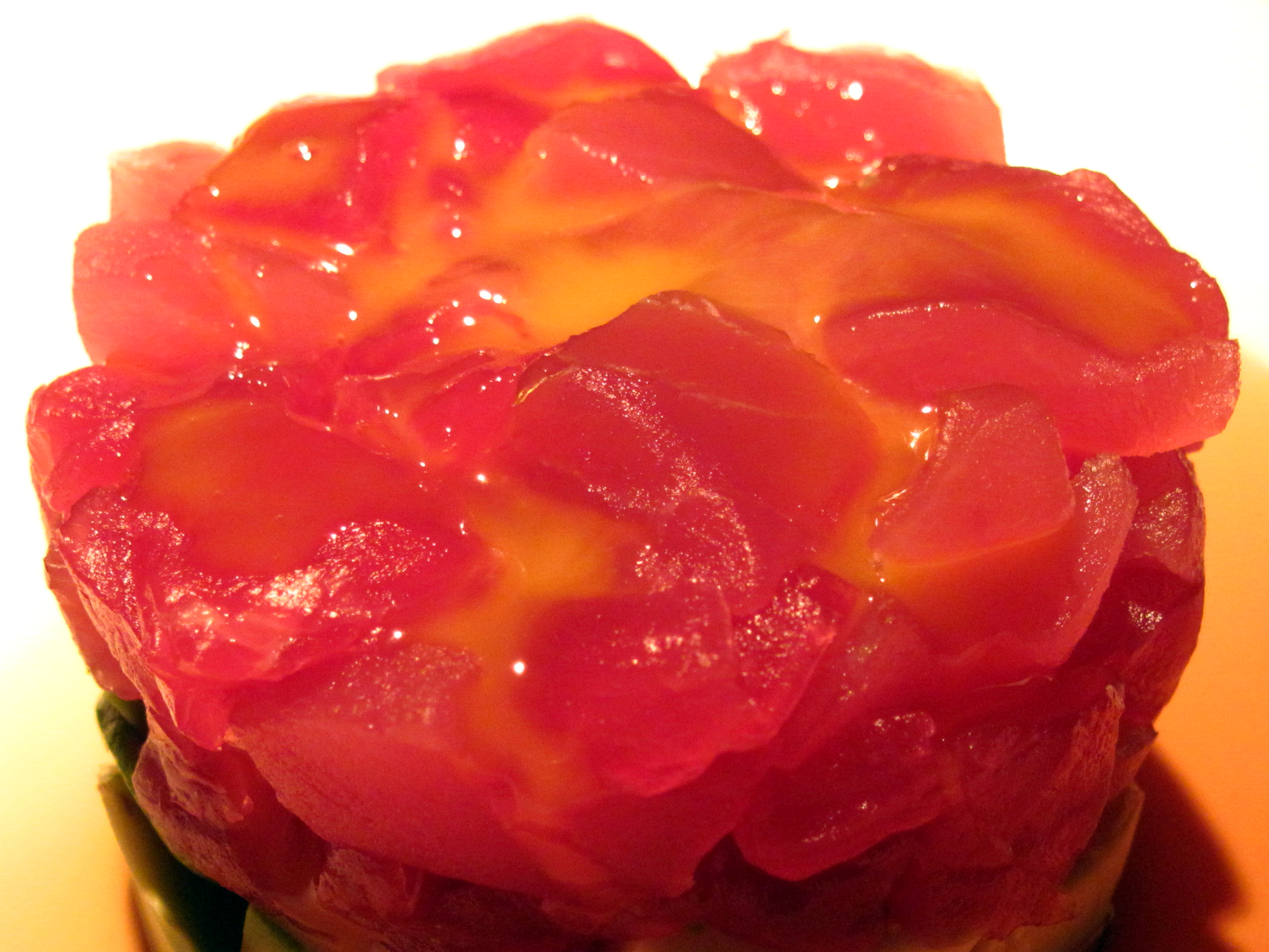
Raw quail egg yolk served over chunks of maguro (raw bluefin tuna) at a sushi restaurant in Naugatuck

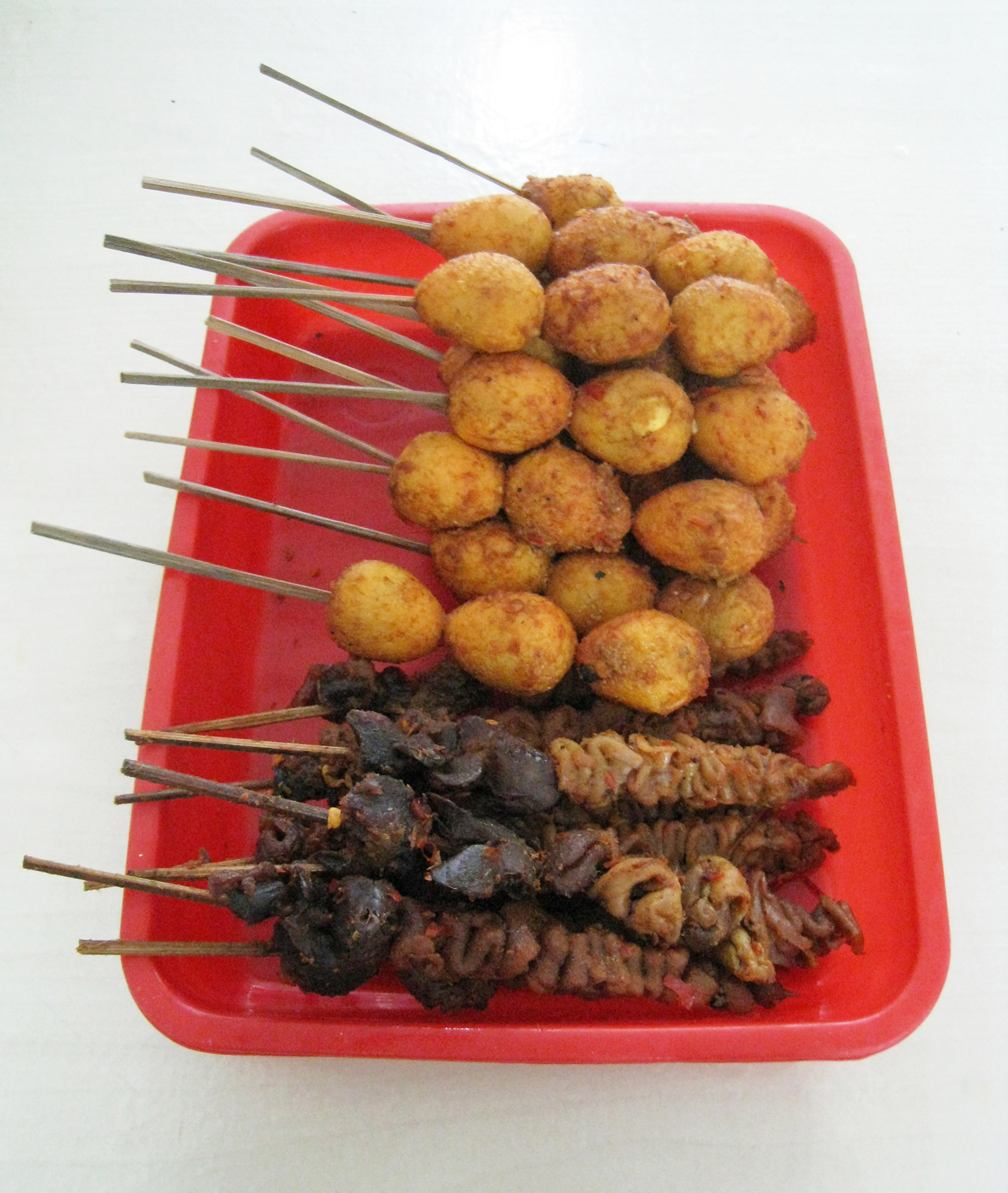
Skewered quail eggs and chicken offal satays in Indonesia

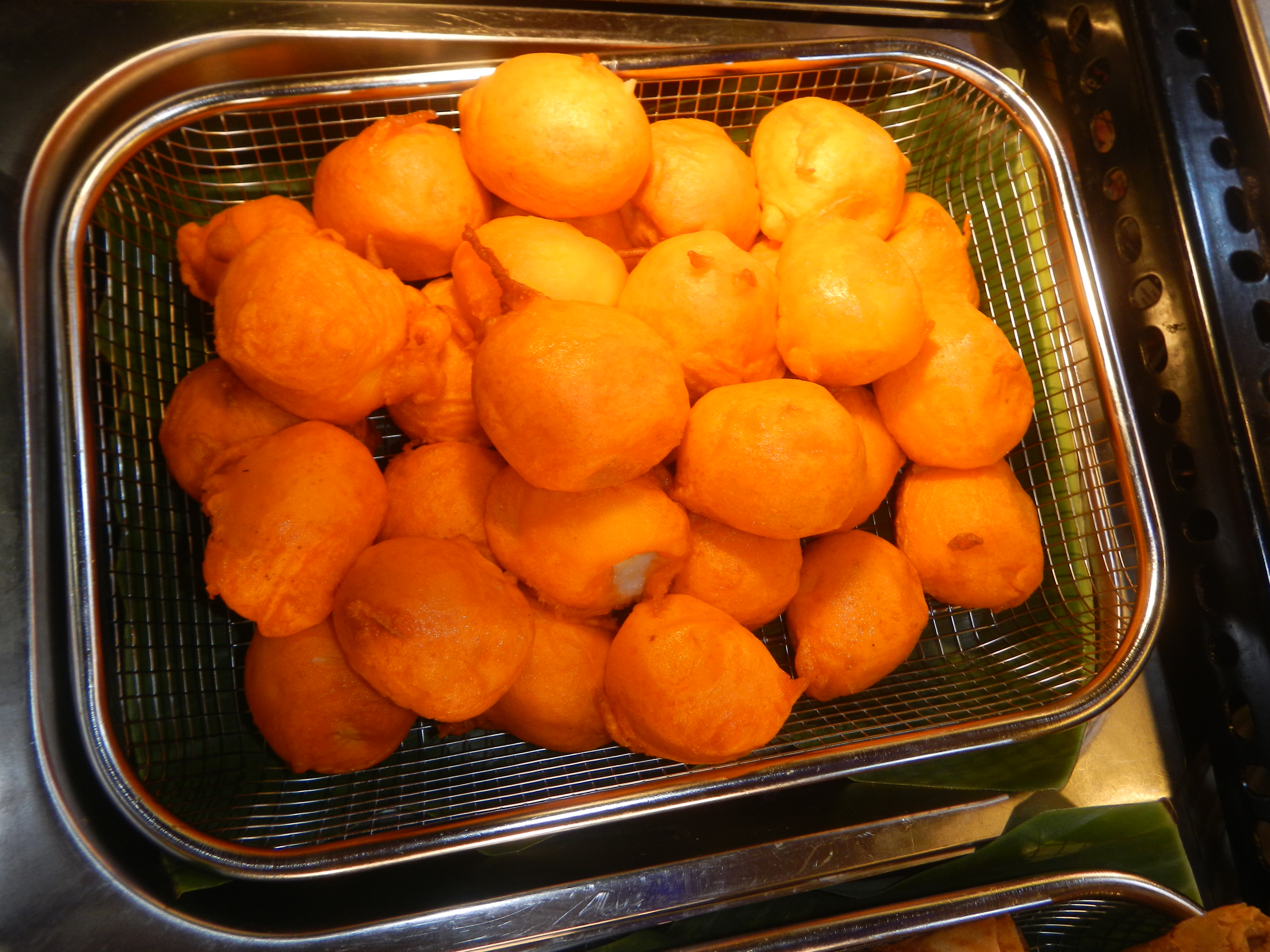
Kwek kwek, deep-fried quail eggs in batter, a popular street food snack in the Philippines

=== Asia ===
- In China, Taiwan and Hong Kong, they are often braised and served with rice and Braised pork rice or siu mai: packaged, cooked and processed quail eggs are a commonly available snack supermarkets, convenience stores and street vendors.
- In Japan, they are sometimes used raw or cooked as tamago in sushi and often found in bento lunches.
- In Korea, large, inexpensive bags of boiled quail eggs are sold in grocery stores.
- In Vietnam, bags of boiled quail eggs are sold on street stalls as inexpensive beer snacks.
- In Philippines, kwek-kwek is a popular street-food delicacy, which consists of soft-boiled quail eggs dipped in orange-colored batter before being skewered and deep-fried.
- In Indonesia, small packages of hard-boiled quail eggs are sold by street vendors as snacks, and skewered quail eggs are sold as satay to accompany main dishes such as soto and bubur ayam.

=== Americas ===
- In Brazil, Colombia, Ecuador, and Venezuela, a single hard-boiled quail egg is a common topping on hot dogs and hamburgers, often fixed into place with a toothpick; They are also believed to be aphrodisiac and sometimes used as a home remedy against erectile dysfunction.

== See also ==
- Gull eggs
- Plover eggs
- Smoked eggs
- Quail as food
