= Scoulton Mere =

Lake in Norfolk, England

Coordinates: 52.573°N 0.929°E

- Site of Special Scientific Interest
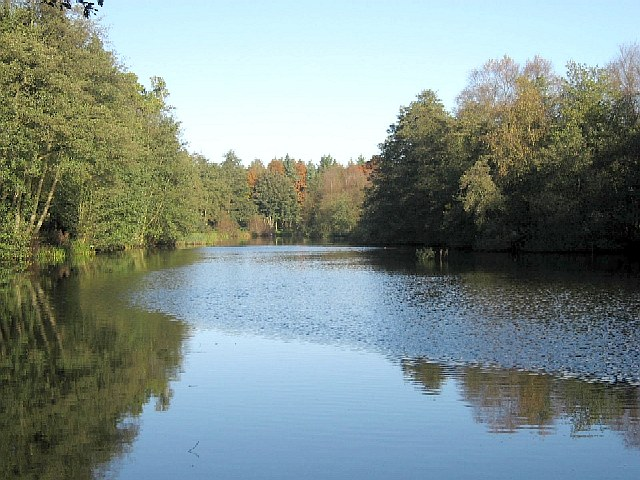
- Location of Scoulton Mere.
- Area of search: Norfolk
- Grid reference: TF 986 013
- Interest: Biological
- Area: 34.2 hectares (85 acres)
- Notification date: 1984
- Location map: Magic Map

Scoulton Mere is a 34.2-hectare (85-acre) biological Site of Special Scientific Interest west of Wymondham in Norfolk, England.

The principal ecological interest of this site lies in the swamp, fen and bog flora on islands in the mere and along the shore. The largest island, called Scoulton Heath, is mainly covered in sphagnum moss, and other plants include the nationally rare crested buckler fern.

There is no public access to the site.
