= Aldo Leopold Legacy Trail System =

Wisconsin state trail system

The Aldo Leopold Legacy Trail System is a system of 42 state trails in the state of Wisconsin, covering a total of 1728 miles. It was named after conservationist and influential University of Wisconsin professor Aldo Leopold. The trail system was created on November 20, 2007, when Governor Jim Doyle signed Senate Bill 161, and dedicated on June 4, 2009.

The trails have features that enable users to learn about the surrounding ecosystems and environments.

== Trails ==
- 400 State Trail
- Ahnapee State Trail
- Badger State Trail
- Bearskin State Trail
- Buffalo River State Trail
- Burlington-Kansasville State Trail
- Capital City State Trail
- Cattail State Trail
- Chippewa River State Trail
- Devil's River State Trail
- Eisenbahn State Trail
- Elroy-Sparta State Trail
- Fox River State Trail
- Friendship State Trail
- Gandy Dancer State Trail
- Glacial Drumlin State Trail
- Great River State Trail
- Green Circle State Trail
- Hank Aaron State Trail
- Hillsboro State Trail
- Ice Age National Scenic Trail
- La Crosse River State Trail
- Mascoutin Valley State Trail
- Military Ridge State Trail
- Mountain-Bay State Trail
- Newton Blackmour State Trail
- Nicolet State Trail
- North Country National Scenic and State Trail
- Oconto River State Trail
- Old Abe State Trail
- Pecatonica State Trail
- Red Cedar State Trail
- Saunders State Trail
- Stower Seven Lakes State Trail
- Sugar River State Trail
- Tomorrow River State Trail
- Tuscobia State Trail
- White River State Trail
- Wild Goose State Trail
- Wild Rivers State Trail
- Wiouwash State Trail
- Wolf River State Trail
