= Charles C. Bradley =

American geologist

- Born: 1911; Chicago, Illinois
- Died: May 18, 2002 (aged 90–91); Baraboo, Wisconsin
- Occupation: Professor
- Spouse(s): Maynard Riggs (unknown – 1969); Nina Leopold (1971 – 2002)
- Parent(s): Harold C. Bradley; Mary Josephine Crane

Charles C. Bradley (1911 – May 18, 2002) was a professor in geology at the Montana State College. He received his bachelor's degree, masters, and doctorate degrees from University of Wisconsin–Madison.

== Family ==
Bradley was the great-grandson of the American missionary to Siam Dan Beach Bradley, the grandson of English professor and Thai linguist Cornelius Beach Bradley, and the son of biochemistry professor Harold Cornelius Bradley.
