= William Hanna Elder =

William Hanna Elder (24 December 1913, Oak Park, Illinois – 14 August 2006, Columbia, Missouri) was a zoology professor, who worked in "wildlife management, range and wildlife habitat management, ornithology, and mammalogy". He was a Guggenheim Fellow for the academic year 1956–1957.

== Education and career ==
Elder graduated from the University of Wisconsin in 1936 with a bachelor's degree in science education, in 1938 with a master's degree, and in 1942 with a Ph.D. in zoology.

Elder worked from 1941 to 1943 as a game biologist for the Illinois Natural History Survey and from 1943 to 1945 as a pharmacologist doing research in chemical warfare in the University of Chicago's Toxicity Laboratory. At the University of Missouri's department of zoology he was from 1945 to 1947 an assistant professor, from 1947 to 1951 an associate professor, and from 1951 to 1984 a full professor, retiring as professor emeritus in 1984. He also chaired the department from 1950 to 1953 and was named the William J. Rucker Professor of Zoology in 1954.

In general terms William Elder's research interest was the physiology of wild birds and mammals as related to their productivity, populations, and management. Specific research ranged widely, however, and included ornithology, hunting pressures in waterfowl, fertility in waterfowl, bats in Missouri, endangered species, the Hawaiian Nene goose (funded in 1956 by a Guggenheim Fellowship and a Yale-Bernice Pauahi Bishop Museum Fellowship), and elephants in Zambia (funded by a 1968 National Science Foundation Grant). He published more than 50 technical papers and many other general articles.

Elder discovered that anticholesterol compound SC-12937 (22, 25-diazacholestanol dihydrochloride) reduced fertility in captive pigeons. In 1964 he received patent rights for an oral chemosterilant for feral pigeons and other nuisance birds. The patent was first assigned to the University of Missouri and licensed to G. D. Searle and Company and then assigned to the Avitrol Corporation headquartered in Tulsa, Oklahoma. In 1967 Wofford and Elder published their field tests of the chemosterilant.

== Family ==
In 1941 Elder married Nina Leopold, the older daughter of naturalist and conservationist Aldo Leopold. Together they studied birds, bats, and other wildlife in Illinois and Missouri. They had two daughters. Accompanied by their daughters, the Elders studied the endangered Nene goose in Hawaii, elephants in Zambia and Rhodesia (now Zimbabwe), and waterbuck in Botswana. Nina Elder assisted in the scientific fieldwork. After divorcing his first wife, Elder married Glennis Fast in 1973.

== Selected publications ==
- Kupperman, Herbert S.; Elder, William H.; Meyer, Roland K. (1941). "Effect of Method of Desiccation and Storage on the Gonadotropic Activity of the Pituitary Gland1". Endocrinology. 29: 23–26. doi:10.1210/endo-29-1-23.
- Elder, Wm. H.; Finerty, John C. (1943). "Gonadotropic activity of the pituitary gland in relation to the seasonal sexual cycle of the cottontail rabbit (Sylvilagus floridanus Mearnsi)". The Anatomical Record. 85: 1–16. doi:10.1002/ar.1090850102. S2CID 84107045.
- Yeager, Lee E.; Elder, William H. (1945). "Pre- and Post-Hunting Season Foods of Raccoons on an Illinois Goose Refuge". The Journal of Wildlife Management. 9 (1): 48–56. doi:10.2307/3795946. JSTOR 3795946.
- Elder, W. H.; Elder, N. L. (1949). "Role of the family in the formation of goose flocks" (PDF). Wilson Bull. 61 (3): 132–140.
- Elder, William H. (1951). "The Baculum as an Age Criterion in Mink". Journal of Mammalogy. 32 (1): 43–50. doi:10.2307/1375411. JSTOR 1375411.
- Elder, William H. (1954). "The Oil Gland of Birds". The Wilson Bulletin. 66 (1): 6–31. JSTOR 4158258.
- Elder, William H.; Weller, Milton W. (1954). "Duration of Fertility in the Domestic Mallard Hen after Isolation from the Drake". The Journal of Wildlife Management. 18 (4): 495–502. doi:10.2307/3797084. JSTOR 3797084.
- Elder, William H. (1954). "The Effect of Lead Poisoning on the Fertility and Fecundity of Domestic Mallard Ducks". The Journal of Wildlife Management. 18 (3): 315–323. doi:10.2307/3797018. JSTOR 3797018.
- Elder, W. H.; Shanks, C. E. (1962). "Age Changes in Tooth Wear and Morphology of the Baculum in Muskrats". Journal of Mammalogy. 43 (2): 144–150. doi:10.2307/1377084. JSTOR 1377084.
- Elder, William H. (1965). "Primeval Deer Hunting Pressures Revealed by Remains from American Indian Middens". The Journal of Wildlife Management. 29 (2): 366–370. doi:10.2307/3798442. JSTOR 3798442.
- Elder, William H.; Elder, Nina L. (1970). "Social Groupings and Primate Associations of the Bushbuck (Tragelaphus scriptus)". Mammalia. 34 (3). doi:10.1515/mamm.1970.34.3.356. S2CID 83496723.
- Elder, William H.; Rodgers, Don H. (1975). "Body Temperature in the African Elephant as Related to Ambient Temperature". Mammalia. 39 (3). doi:10.1515/mamm.1975.39.3.395. S2CID 83713081.
- Elder, W. H.; Hayden, C. M. (1977). "Use of Discriminant Function in Taxonomic Determination of Canids from Missouri". Journal of Mammalogy. 58 (1): 17–24. doi:10.2307/1379722. JSTOR 1379722.
- Eddleman, William R.; Evans, Keith E.; Elder, William H. (1980). "Habitat Characteristics and Management of Swainson's Warbler in Southern Illinois". Wildlife Society Bulletin. 8 (3): 228–233. JSTOR 3781694.
- Brawn, Jeffrey D.; Elder, William H.; Evans, Keith E. (1982). "Winter Foraging by Cavity Nesting Birds in an Oak-Hickory Forest". Wildlife Society Bulletin. 10 (3): 271–275. JSTOR 3781017.
- Toland, Brian R.; Elder, William H. (1987). "Influence of Nest-Box Placement and Density on Abundance and Productivity of American Kestrels in Central Missouri". The Wilson Bulletin. 99 (4): 712–717. JSTOR 4162483.
