= Harold C. Bradley =

American scientist and academic

- Born: November 25, 1878; Oakland, California, US
- Died: January 4, 1976 (aged 97); Berkeley, California, US
- Occupation: Professor
- Spouse: Mary Josephine Crane (1886–1952)
- Children: Mary Cornelia Bradley; Charles C. Bradley
- Parent(s): Cornelius Beach Bradley; Mary Sarepta Comings

Harold Cornelius Bradley (November 25, 1878 – January 4, 1976) was an American scientist and academic who was professor of biochemistry at the University of Wisconsin. Bradley relocated to Madison in 1906, where he was one of the first three staff members of the new University of Wisconsin Medical School. Bradley was an avid skier, he skied solo across the Sierra range in 1920 and skied until age 85; he was inducted into the Madison Sports Hall of Fame and the National Ski Hall of Fame. He also served as an honorary president of the Sierra Club. Bradley retired in 1948 and relocated to California. He died in Berkeley, California.

== Family ==
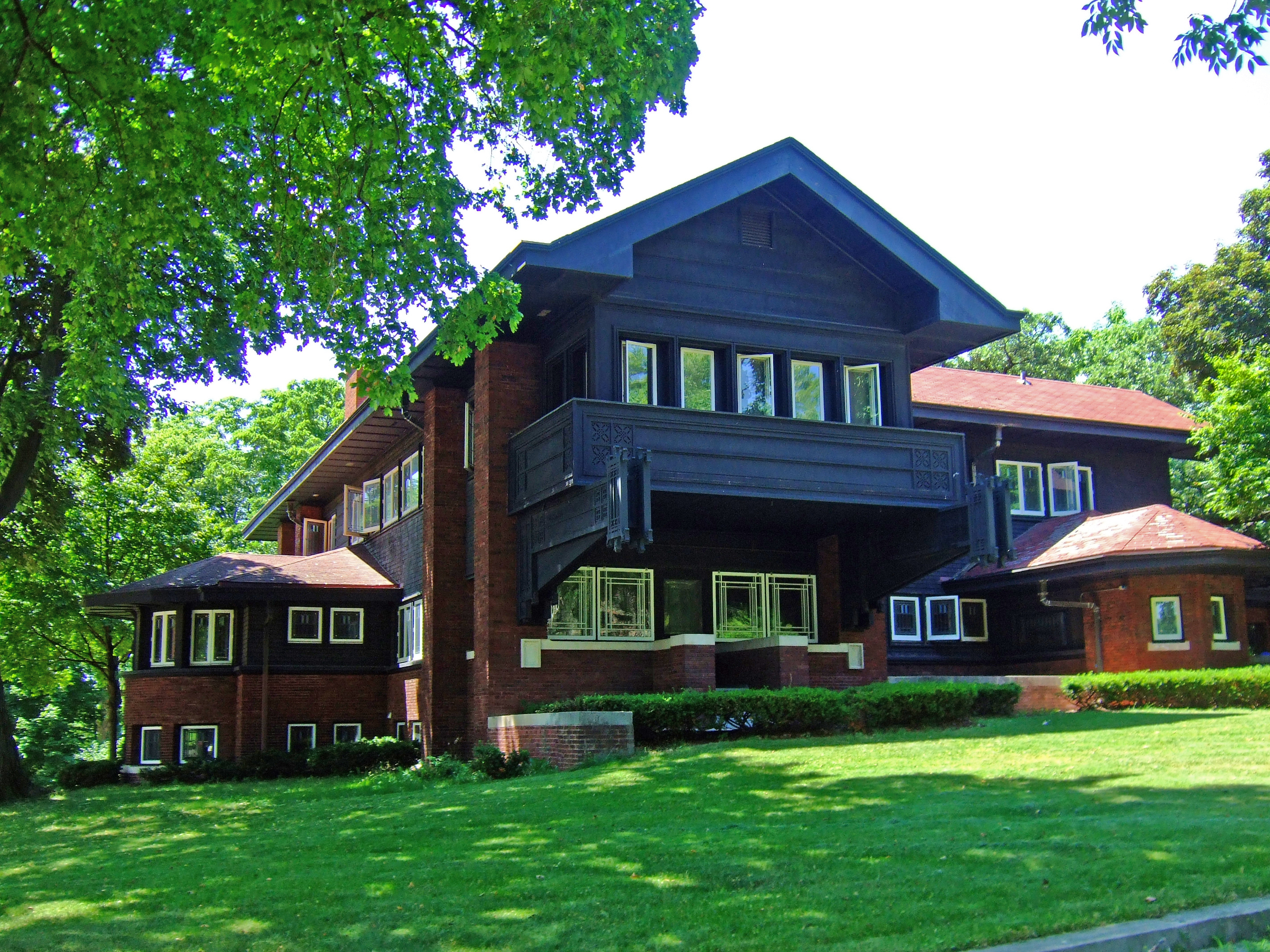
The Harold C. Bradley House in Madison, Wisconsin

Bradley was the grandson of the American missionary to Siam Dan Beach Bradley, the son of English professor and Thai linguist Cornelius Beach Bradley, and the father of geology professor Charles C. Bradley. He was married to Mary Josephine Crane (1886–1952).

== Legacy ==
Bradley was instrumental in encouraging outdoor education through the Wisconsin Hoofers Clubs at the University of Wisconsin; a lounge at the Wisconsin Union is named for him. One of UW-Madison's two residential learning communities (the other Chadbourne) is named after Harold C. Bradley.

== See also ==
- Harold C. Bradley House
