= Leopold Wetland Management District =

Wildlife refuge in Wisconsin, United States

Coordinates: 43°29′58″N 89°30′4″W

The Leopold Wetland Management District is named after Aldo Leopold, who is widely acknowledged as the father of wildlife conservation in America. Leopold is perhaps best known as the author of A Sand County Almanac, a book compiled of essays written on his farm in central Wisconsin. In tribute to his philosophy, the Leopold Wetland Management District is dedicated to preserving, restoring, and enhancing wildlife habitat in Wisconsin for the benefit of present and future generations.

The district, established in 1993, manages over 12,000 acres (49 km^{2}) of waterfowl production areas (WPAs) in 17 southeastern Wisconsin counties, covering some of the most important waterfowl areas of Wisconsin. The district also administers 45 conservation easements, totaling 3,000 acres (12 km^{2}), in 34 eastern Wisconsin counties. WPAs consist of wetland habitat surrounded by grassland and woodland communities. While WPAs are managed primarily for ducks and geese, they also provide habitat for a variety of other wildlife species such as non-game grassland birds, shorebirds, wading birds, minks, muskrats, wild turkeys, and deer.
