= Harold C. Bradley House =

Historic house in Wisconsin, United States

- U.S. National Register of Historic Places
- U.S. National Historic Landmark
- U.S. Historic district – Contributing property
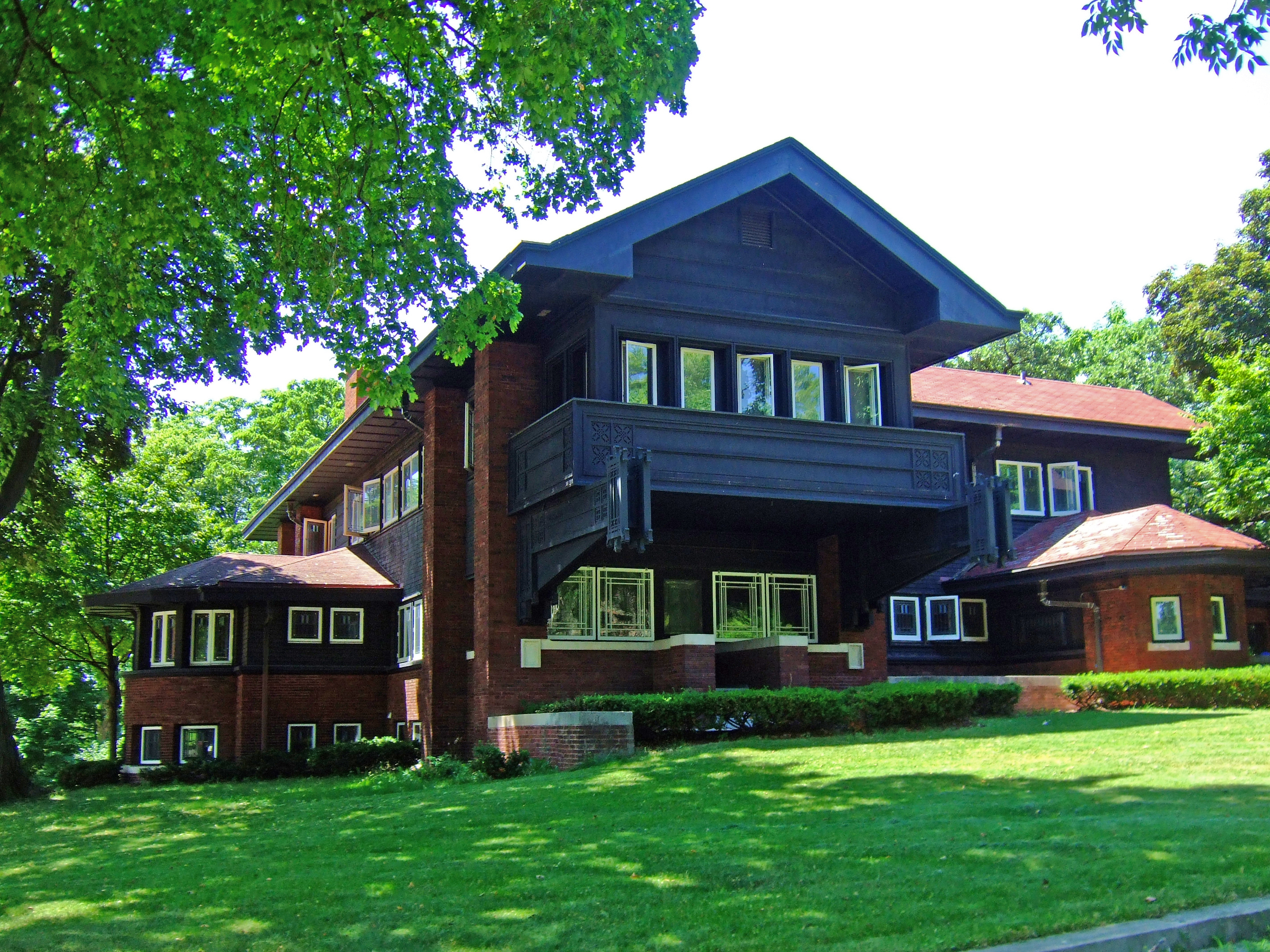

- Location within Wisconsin Location within the United States
- Location: 106 N. Prospect Ave., Madison, Wisconsin
- Coordinates: 43°4′11.27″N 89°25′18.76″W
- Built: 1909
- Architect: Louis H. Sullivan; George Grant Elmslie
- Architectural style: Prairie School
- Part of: University Heights Historic District (ID82001844)
- NRHP reference No.: 72000047

Significant dates
- Added to NRHP: February 23, 1972
- Designated NHL: January 7, 1976
- Designated CP: December 17, 1982

Harold C. Bradley House, also known as Mrs. Josephine Crane Bradley Residence, is a Prairie School home in the University Heights Historic District of Madison, Wisconsin, United States. Designed by Louis H. Sullivan and George Grant Elmslie, it is one of just a few residential designs by Sullivan, and one of only two Sullivan designs in Wisconsin. It is designated a National Historic Landmark.

== History ==
When Harold C. Bradley, a biochemistry professor at the University of Wisconsin–Madison and a founder of the Hoofers Club, married Josephine Crane, her grandfather Richard T. Crane built this house for them as a present. Money was not a concern, and Crane hired the prestigious Chicago firm of Louis Sullivan to design a large home in the then-popular Prairie style. The house is two stories with a T-shaped footprint, with distinctive cantilevered sections that hold sleeping porches. (A sleeping porch was a way to deal with hot summer nights before there was air conditioning.) At the back is a porte-cochère. The architects also designed furniture, rugs, draperies and fixtures inside. Though Sullivan was the principal of the firm, George Elmslie may have designed much of the house and furnishings.

George Grant Elmslie joined the architectural partnership of Adler & Sullivan in 1888. Following the dismissal of Frank Lloyd Wright from the firm, and especially once the partnership dissolved, Elmslie's role under Louis Sullivan increased. Elmslie was entrusted with the design of the main facade of the Gage Building and of all of the details of the Carson, Pirie, Scott and Company Building. The Bradley House was designed at a time when Sullivan's architectural practice was starting to fail. Once considered the foremost designer of skyscrapers, Sullivan now struggled to secure commissions and often sparred with clients. The Bradley House was "designed by Elmslie with only occasional suggestions from Sullivan." All drawings of the building were sketched by Elmslie and many of the architectural details are consistent with the style he would develop later in his career with William Gray Purcell. The Bradley House was the last building Elmslie designed while with Sullivan; he left to partner with Purcell in 1909.

An elaborate design was initially planned for the Bradley House with a cruciform design. It featured a living room and force to the rear, a library and kitchen on the two wings, and a porte-cochère on the main entrance. Bays projected out of the house, lined with casement windows. However, the Bradleys rejected this draft as too large. Elmslie reenvisioned the house on a smaller scale and included a pair of cantilevered sleeping porches on the second floor. Sullivan was probably responsible for the idea of the sleeping porches, though Elmslie was responsible for integrating them into the final design. Elmslie was not satisfied with the result when the house was completed.

The Bradleys lived in the house only a few years. Even after reducing the size, they still found it too big and expensive to maintain. They hired George Elmslie again, now partnered with William Purcell, to design a smaller Prairie style home with sleeping porches about two miles to the northwest at 2914 Oxford Road in Shorewood Hills. They moved there around 1915. Since then, the first house has been occupied and maintained by the Sigma Phi Society, University of Wisconsin–Madison chapter.

The Harold C. Bradley House was entered in the National Register of Historic Places in 1973 and declared a National Historic Landmark in 1976. The blueprints of the Bradley House are held in the Illinois History and Lincoln Collections at the University of Illinois Library in Urbana–Champaign.

== Gallery ==
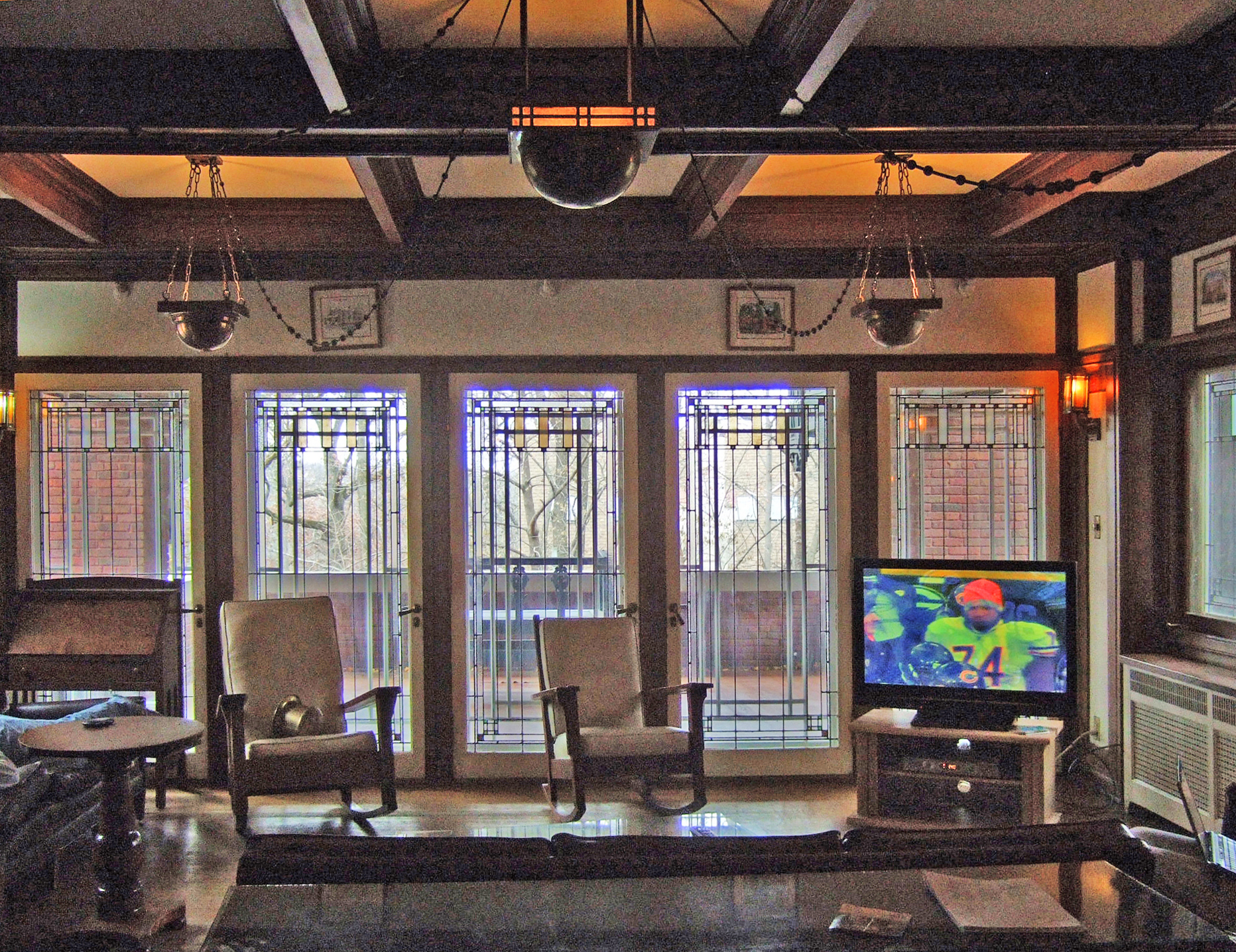
Living room

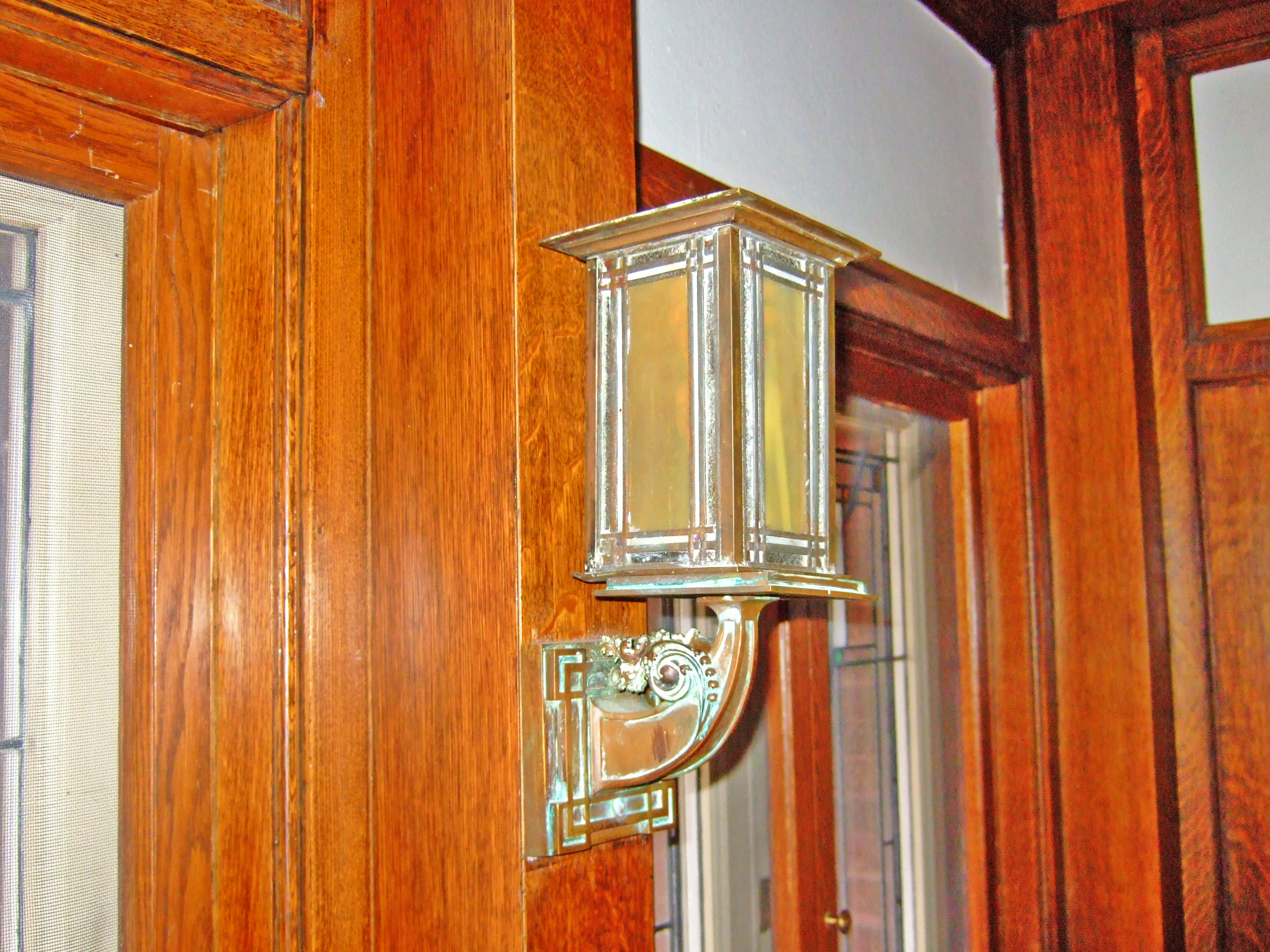

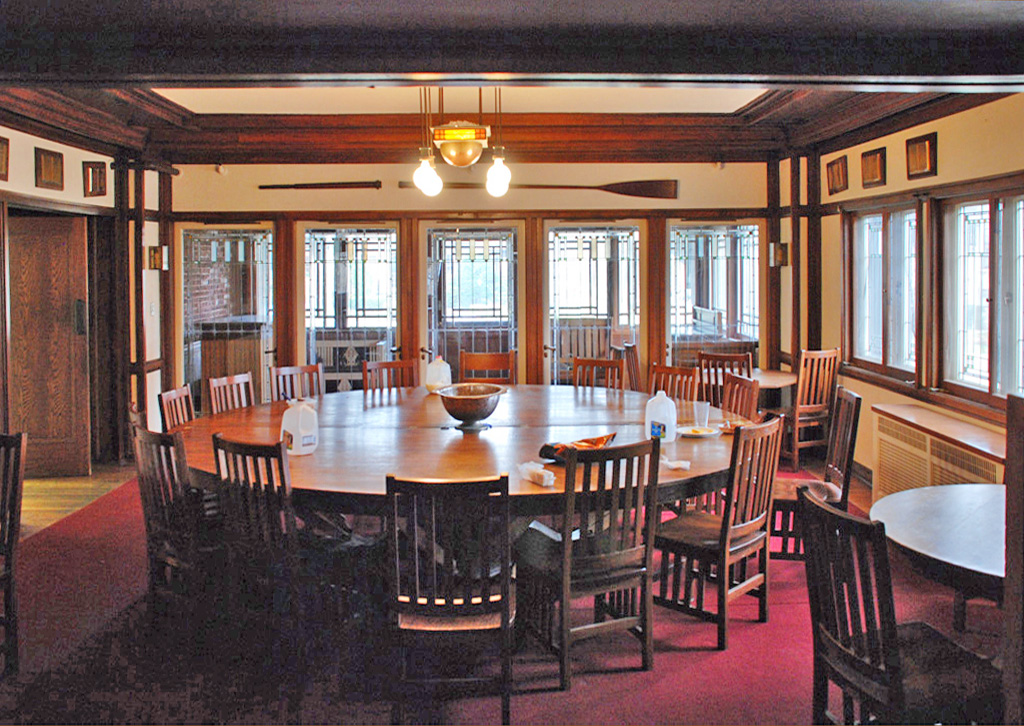
Dining room

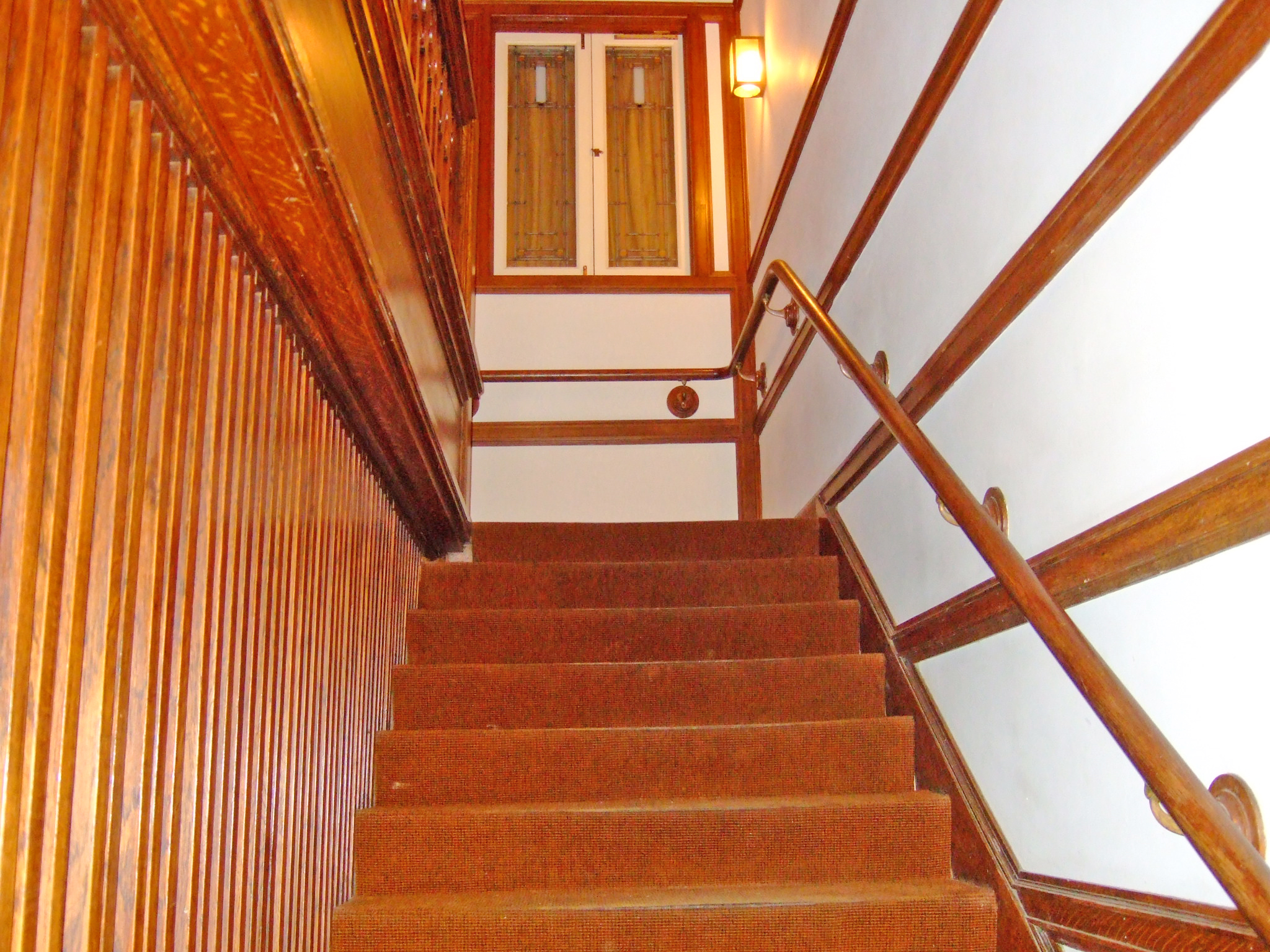

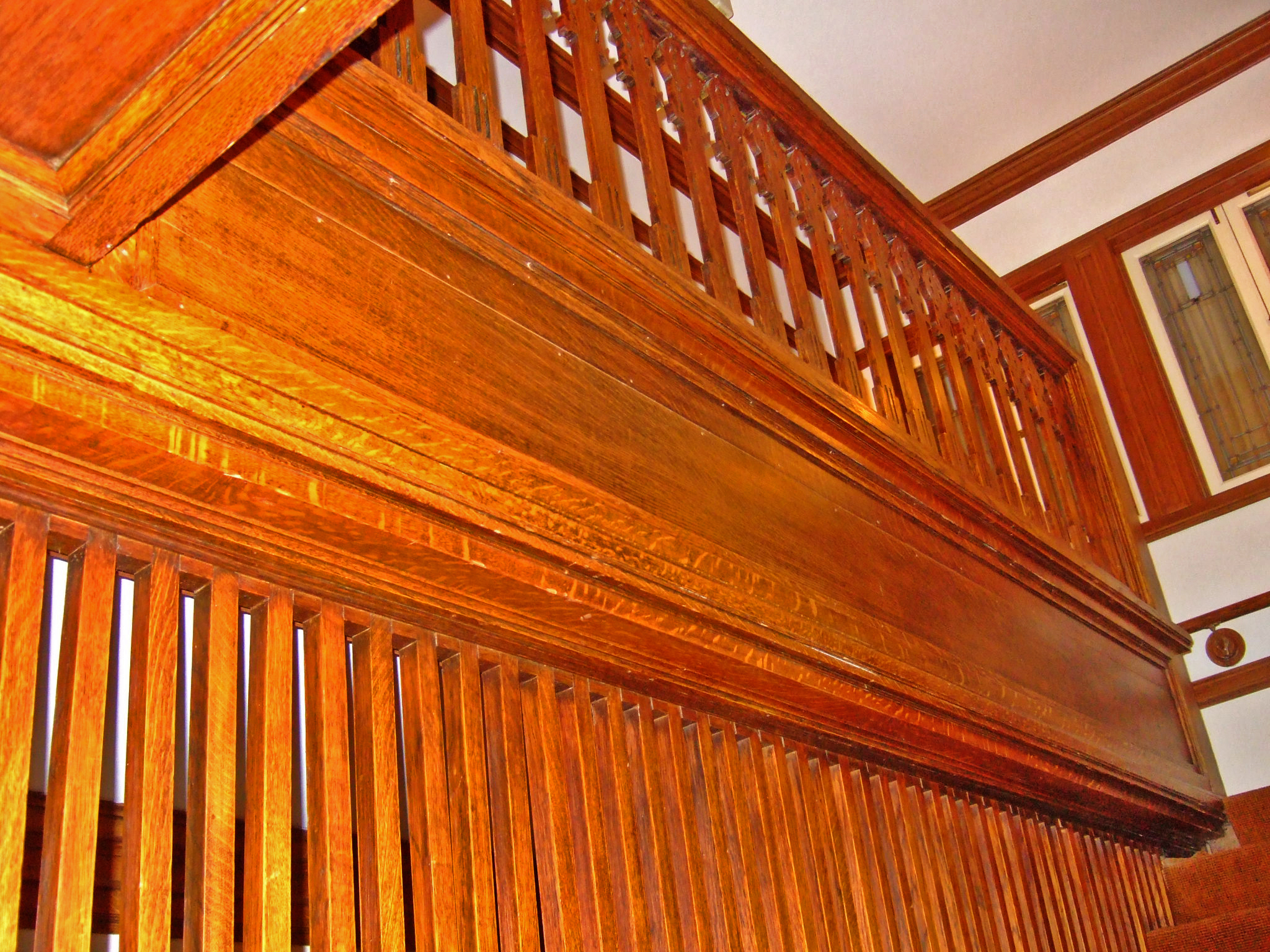

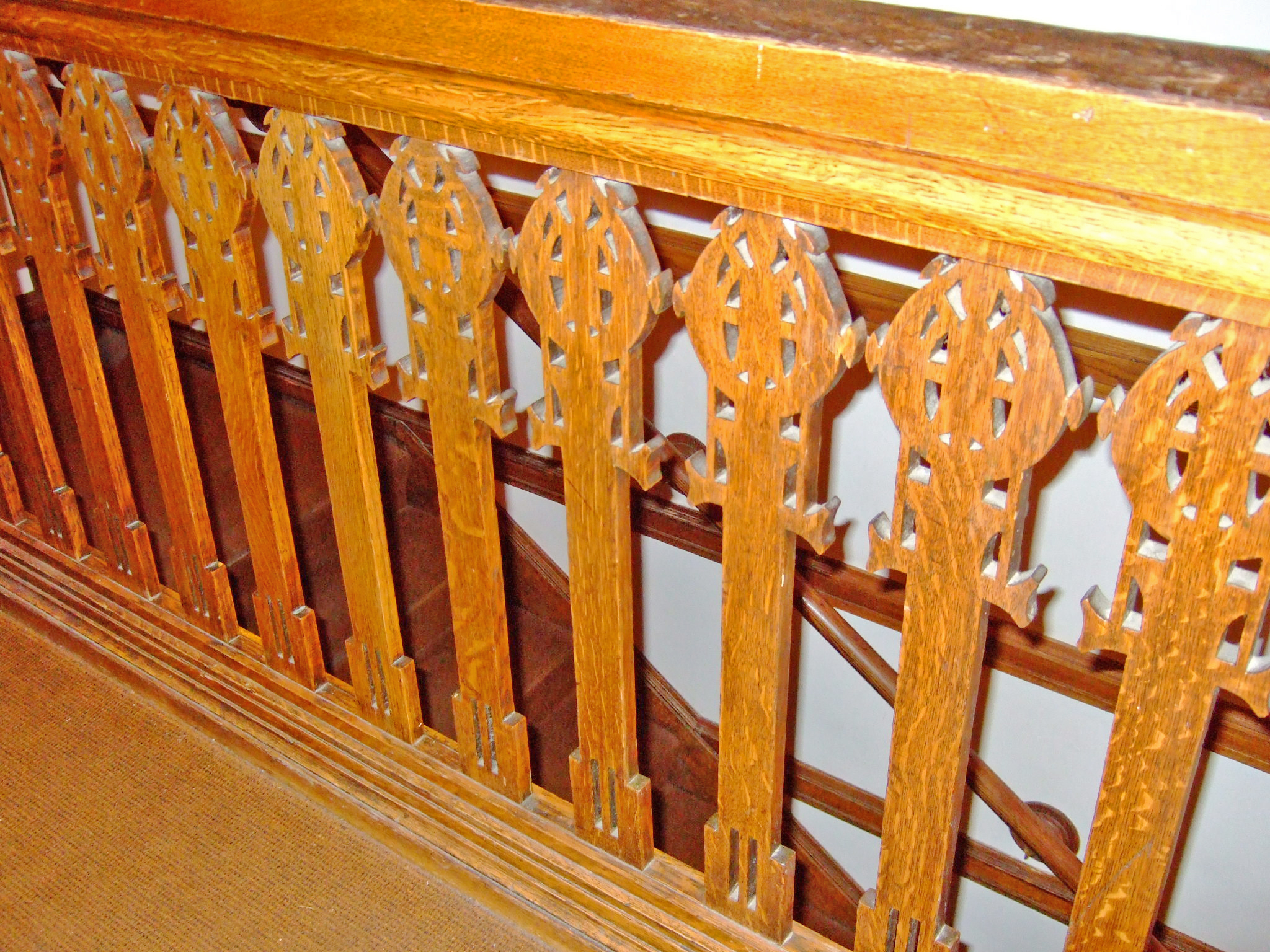

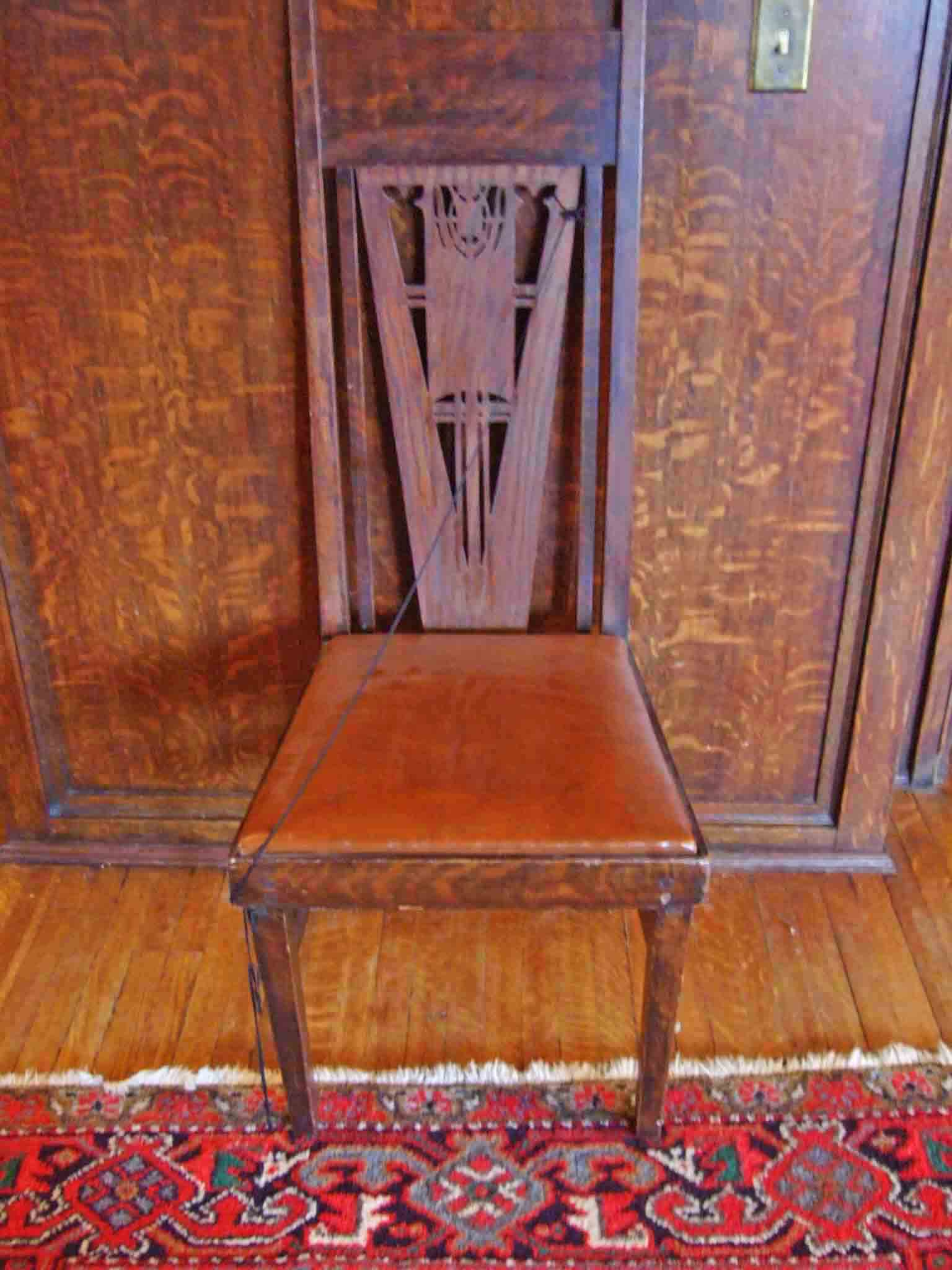

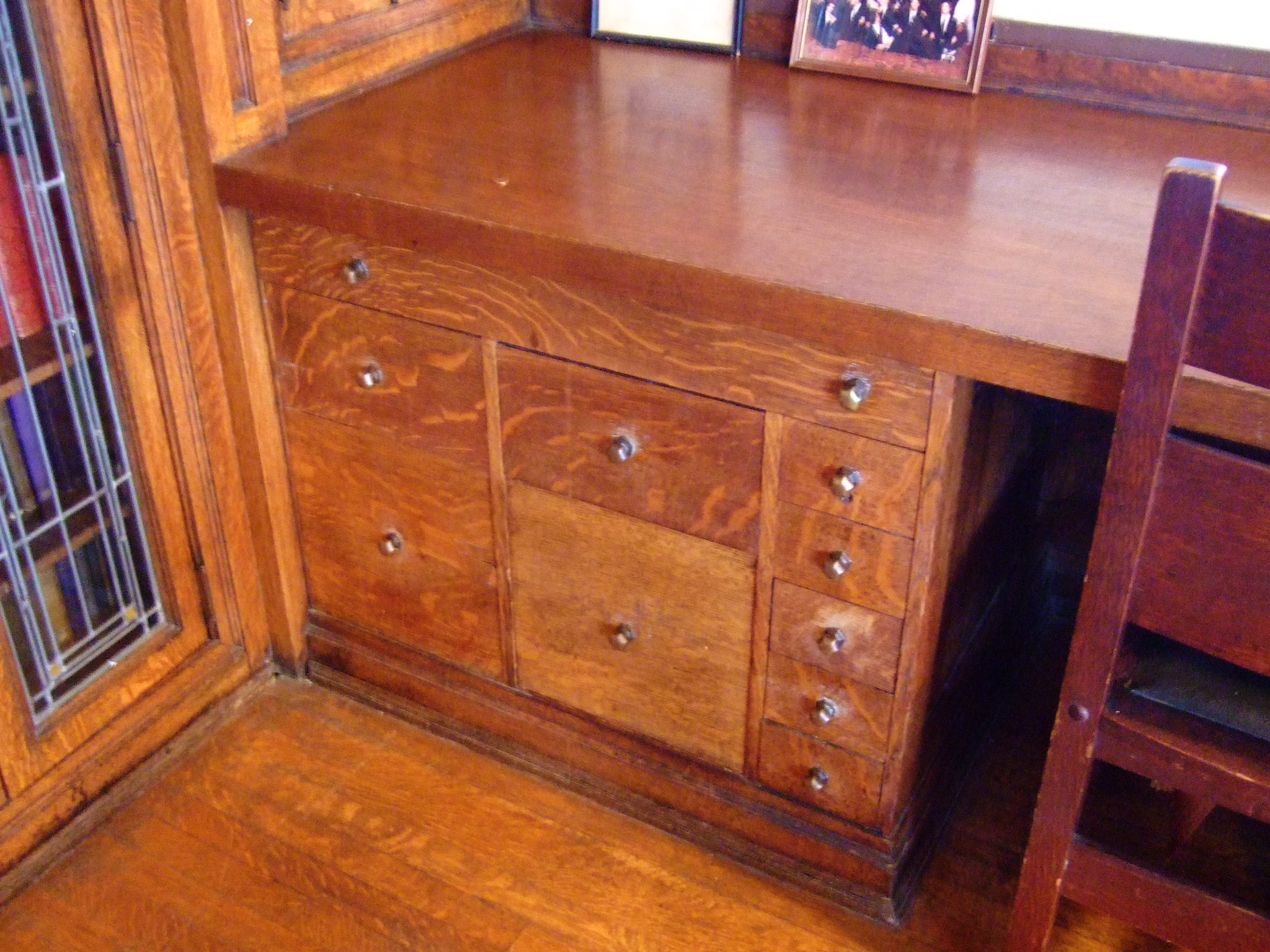
Built-in desk

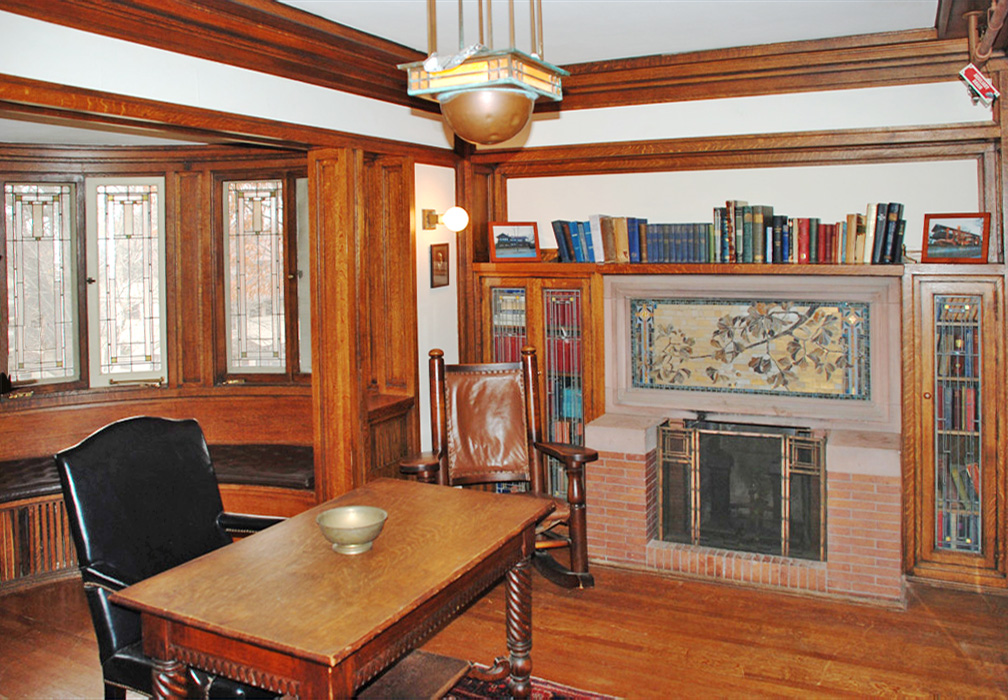
Study

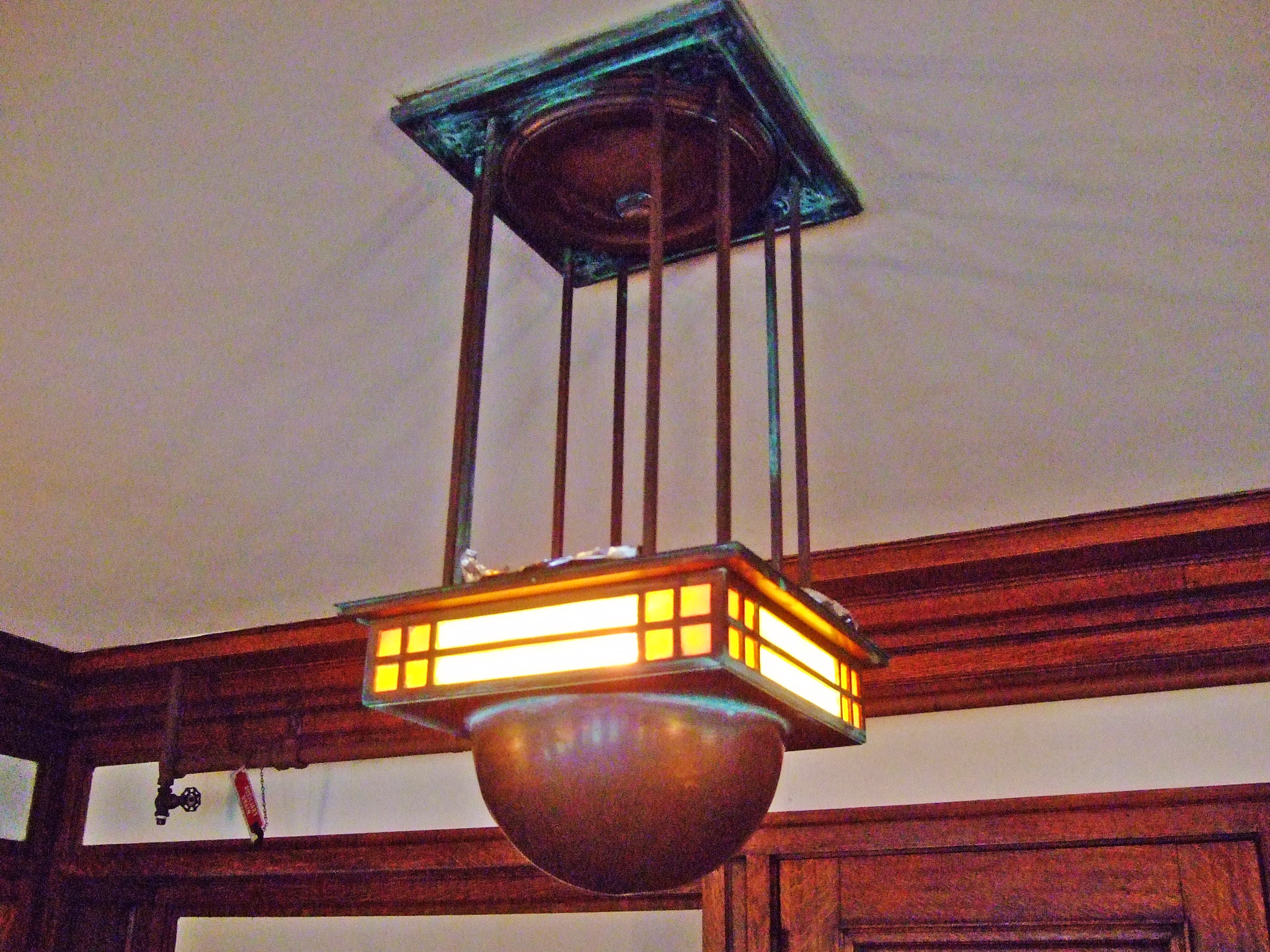

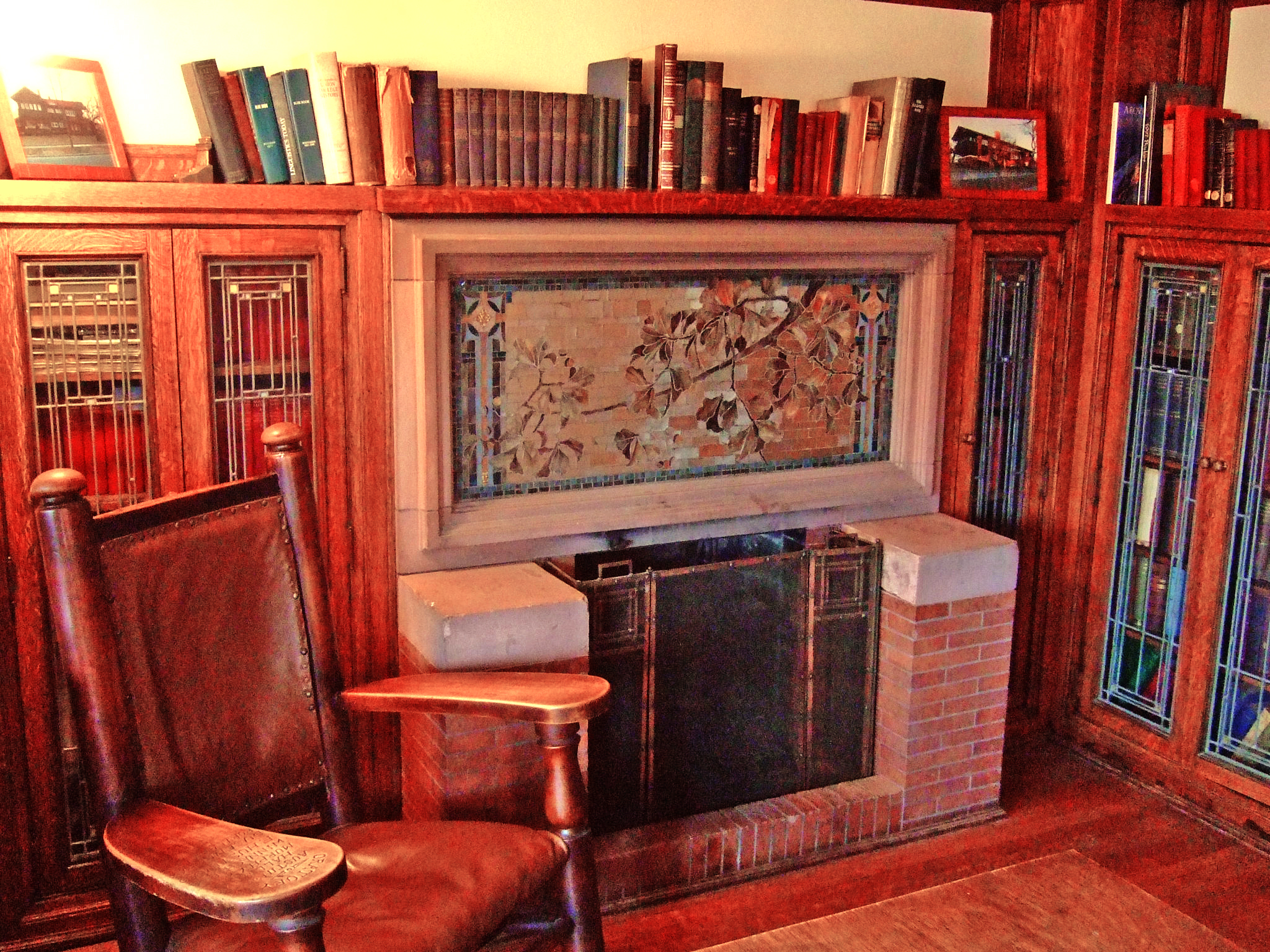

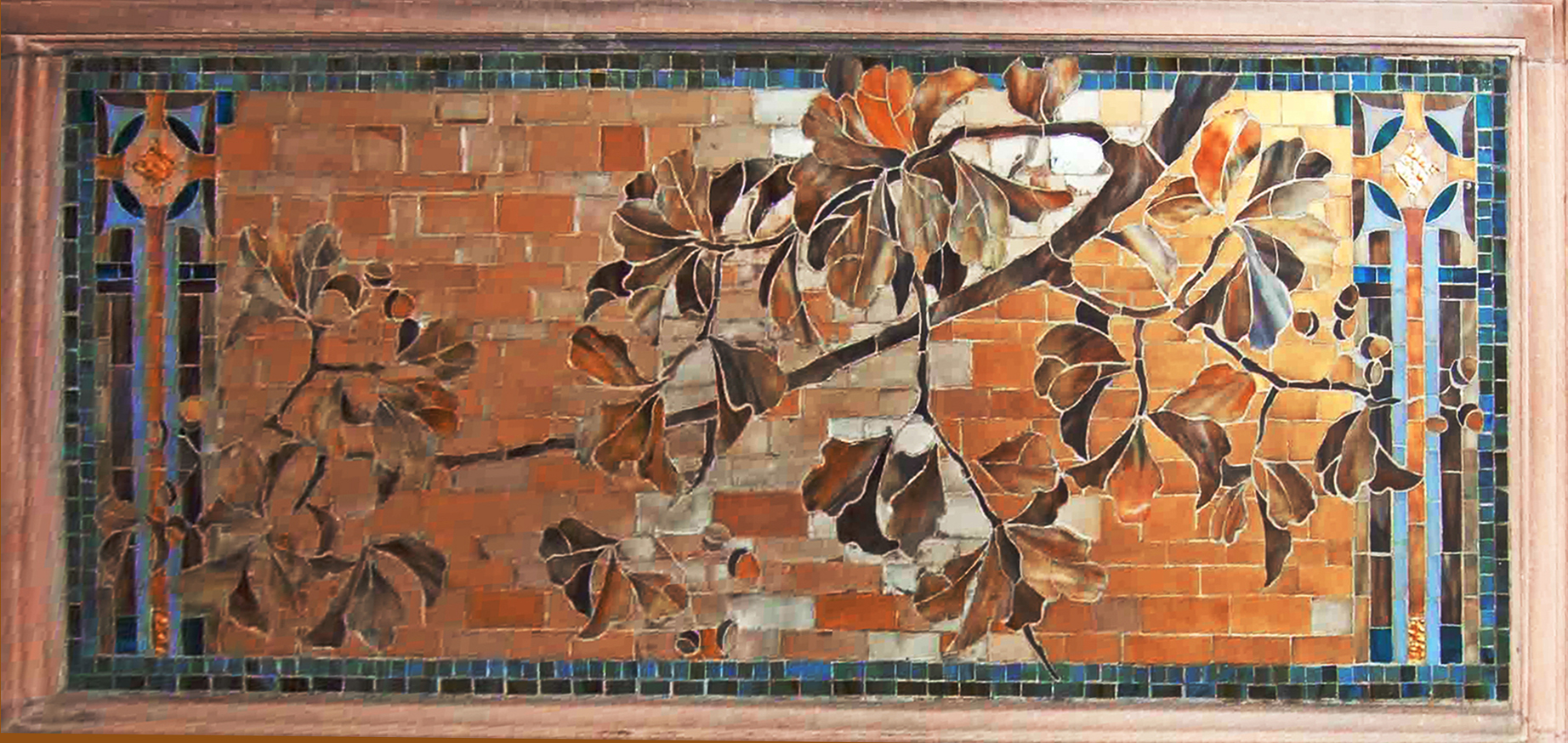
Art tiles in fireplace

== See also ==
- List of National Historic Landmarks in Wisconsin
- National Register of Historic Places listings in Madison, Wisconsin
- North American fraternity and sorority housing
