= Nina Leopold Bradley =

American conservationist, researcher and writer

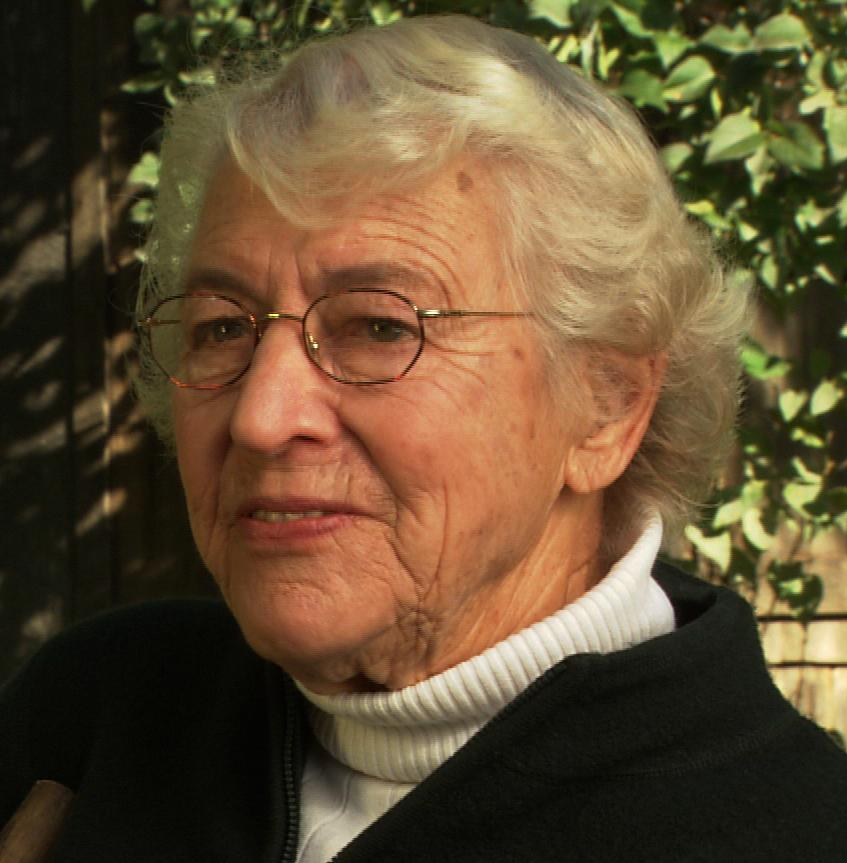
- Bradley in 2011
- Born: August 4, 1917
- Died: May 25, 2011 (aged 93); Baraboo, Wisconsin, US
- Occupation: Conservationist
- Spouse(s): William Hanna Elder (1941-?), Charles C. Bradley (1971–2002)
- Parent(s): Aldo Leopold, Estella Leopold

Nina Leopold Bradley (born Nina Leopold) (August 4, 1917 – May 25, 2011) was an American conservationist, researcher and writer.

== Biography ==
Her father was the ecologist Aldo Leopold.

She graduated with a bachelor's degree in geography from the University of Wisconsin–Madison. During WW II she worked as an assistant to Thomas Park on the Tribolium project at the University of Chicago. She was the senior author of the 1999 article Phenological changes reflect climate change in Wisconsin, which has over 700 citations.

She married the zoologist William H. Elder in 1941. Working together, they studied wildlife in Illinois and Missouri. They had two daughters and did field work together in Hawaii and Africa. Their marriage ended in divorce. In 1971 she married the geologist Charles C. Bradley.

== Death and legacy ==
She died May 25, 2011, aged 93.

In 2013, Bradley was posthumously inducted into the Wisconsin Conservation Hall of Fame.
