= Aldo Leopold Neighborhood Historic District =

- U.S. National Register of Historic Places
- U.S. Historic district
- NM State Register of Cultural Properties
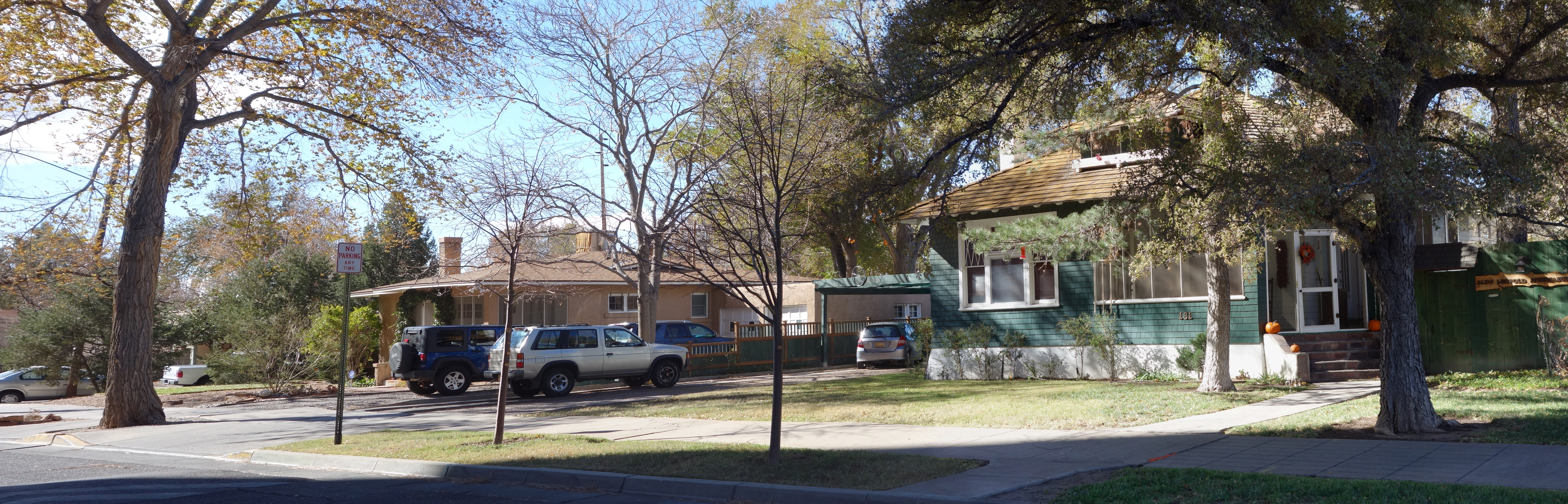
- 135 and 131 14th St. in 2014

- Location within New Mexico Location within the United States
- Location: 105–135 14th St. SW; Albuquerque, New Mexico
- Coordinates: 35°5′15″N 106°39′45″W
- Built: 1913–1920
- NRHP reference No.: 02001164
- NMSRCP No.: 1818

Significant dates
- Added to NRHP: October 16, 2002
- Designated NMSRCP: August 16, 2002

The Aldo Leopold Neighborhood Historic District is a historic district in Albuquerque, New Mexico, which comprises a single block on the west side of 14th Street immediately south of Central Avenue. It is notable for its Craftsman/Bungalow-style houses and as the residence of noted naturalist Aldo Leopold. The district makes up the northernmost section of the Huning Place addition, which was platted in 1913 from a section of the large estate formerly belonging to merchant Franz Huning. The eight houses in the district, all of which are contributing properties, were built between 1913 and 1920. The district was added to the New Mexico State Register of Cultural Properties and the National Register of Historic Places in 2002. Aldo Leopold's house at 135 14th St. is also individually listed on the State Register with reference number 1786.
