= Thinking like a mountain =

Aldo Leopold's concept of seeing humans' role in ecosystems

Thinking like a mountain is a term coined by Aldo Leopold in his book A Sand County Almanac. In the section entitled "Sketches Here and There" Leopold discusses the thought process as a holistic view on where one stands in the entire ecosystem. To think like a mountain means to have a complete appreciation for the profound interconnectedness of the elements in the ecosystems. It is an ecological exercise using the intricate web of the natural environment rather than thinking as an isolated individual.

== Origins of the term ==
Aldo Leopold first came up with this term as a result of watching the death of a wolf that had been shot and was dying slowly. In those days of Leopold's adventures, no one would ever pass up killing a wolf because fewer wolves meant more deer, which meant great hunting experiences. However, when Leopold saw the “fierce green fire dying in her eyes” he knew that neither the mountain nor the wolf deserved this. Leopold stated in his book, A Sand County Almanac:

Since then I have lived to see state after state extirpate its wolves. I have watched the face of many a newly wolfless mountain, and seen the south-facing slopes wrinkle with a maze of new deer trails. I have seen every edible bush and seedling browsed, first to anaemic desuetude, and then to death. I have seen every edible tree defoliated to the height of a saddlehorn … In the end the starved bones of the hoped-for deer herd, dead of its own too-much, bleach with the bones of the dead sage, or molder under the high-lined junipers … So also with cows. The cowman who cleans his range of wolves does not realize that he is taking over the wolf’s job of trimming the herd to fit the change. He has not learned to think like a mountain. Hence we have dustbowls, and rivers washing the future into the sea.

In this example Leopold shows that the removal of a single species can result in serious negative consequences in an ecosystem. While avoiding trophic cascades is one way to think like a mountain, there are countless other environmental actions that can be categorized under this broad and interconnected concept.

== Examples in antiquity ==
Although the term was not coined until 1949, several philosophers of ancient times had viewpoints similar to those who “think like a mountain”. Epicurus was one of the first ancient philosophers to view the role humans play in nature. His philosophy, Epicureanism, is a materialistic viewpoint that sought to explain the universe solely by natural causes.

Lucretius was a later philosopher who had Epicurean ideals. He wrote a six book collection, De Rerum Natura, categorizing the natural word. In Book 5 of De Rerum Natura he writes:

They [Roman gods] did not create the world for us [humans], why should they? They did not create humans, how could they? They had no conception of humans until nature and natural causes (the union of atoms) showed them the way. Besides the gods were absolutely happy as they were, and the creating of humans could not increase their happiness. After numberless attempts and numberless failures the concourse of atoms gradually formed the world.

In this passage, Lucretius is defining human's place in the creation of the world. Lucretius is an Epicurean supporter, believing that living modestly and gaining knowledge of the working world were the keys to a more pleasurable life.

Aristotle also philosophized about human's place in the ecosystem. In his Politics, he discusses the role of community as used when referring to cities, neighborhoods, and households. The idea of thinking like a mountain is primarily ecological, but it can be applied to politics as well. Aristotle provides resources for citizens on how they as individuals fit into their community.

Other ancient philosophers approach the idea of viewing one's place in the ecosystem as well. They include Sophocles, a Greek philosopher, and Columella, a Roman philosopher. Sophocles writes in Antigone about natural law and legal institutions. In his eyes, the laws of the gods outweigh those of humans and humans must understand their place in the order of natural law. Columella, similar to the Epicureans, believed that in order to make the most efficient use of the land, humans should not rely on the gods, but should become more educated and learn to use resources more efficiently.

== Contemporary examples ==
In much the same way that Rachel Carson’s bellwether manuscript Silent Spring changed the realm of how and which chemicals are used in nature, Aldo Leopold changed the views on ecological impact on the environment around us with the introduction of the term “Thinking Like a Mountain” in his book A Sand County Almanac in 1949. Since then, the phrase and the particular mindset it generates has greatly influenced people in all walks of life.

== Books ==
Philip Connors has attempted to further Leopold's elucidation with respect to matters of the environment through literature. In many of his books, most notably Fire Season, Connors alludes to thinking like a mountain when he urges the reader to think about more than just the costs and benefits an action has on their person. He believes that everyone who witnesses the environment should have the goal of achieving what Leopold spoke of when he describes living in harmony with nature. Connors said,

We touch the ancient mysteries of life in the wild. We may even learn to see in new ways — more closely, perhaps, and deeper into geologic time. If we’re lucky we get close to learning how to ‘think like a mountain,’ in Aldo Leopold’s great phrase.

Another author, Leslie Thiele refers to thinking like a mountain in multiple chapters in his book Indra's Net and the Midas Touch. Within one chapter, Thiele explains how thinking like a mountain is, first and foremost, an ecological principle for a sustainable existence. Later, he also cites this sort of living as a basis for environmental ethics. Thiele summarizes his view of thinking like a mountain as

a full appreciation of the vast and intricate web of interdependent relationships that constitute a mountain oikos.

== Film ==
The idea of thinking like a mountain has also permeated its way into the world of full-length movies and documentaries. Green Fire, released in 2011, is a documentary about Aldo Leopold's influence on modern environmentalism and revolves around the concept of thinking like a mountain. The name Green Fire was meant to capture the image of Leopold's dying she wolf and the passion with which he pursued environmental justice and ecological balance throughout his life.

Filmmaker Alexander Hick spent several months in 2017 among the Arhuaco community in the Sierra Nevada de Santa Marta, Colombia, filming a feature documentary titled "Thinking Like A Mountain" with his brother Immanuel Hick as Director of Photography. The film was released at the International Film Festival Nyon "visions du reel" on April 15, 2018, and screened at other festivals around the world. The Film won the Human Rights Film Award Deutscher Menschenrechts Filmpreis" in one of the categories.

Mission Wolf: Experiment in Living (2018) documents a group of volunteers near the southern edge of the Rocky Mountains who seek to nurture themselves just as they nurture the wolves they care deeply about. Leopold's thoughts on wolves and nature are reflected and reference in the film.

== Music ==
The mindset of thinking like a mountain has been infused into music as well. Folk artist Libby Roderick has used the idea of thinking like a mountain as a foundation for her album Thinking Like a Mountain. In one song in particular, Roderick equates thinking like a mountain to being safe, home, or complete. Also, she ends each stanza with “Thinking like a mountain, honey, we will make it home” as if to say that eventually we will all think with a long-term perspective and get our lives back on a safe and sustainable track. Furthermore, Roderick ends the song with an ultimatum for each of our lives.

Find the mountain deep within your heart, it's calling you back home!

== See also ==
- Positive feedback
