= The Bangkok Recorder =

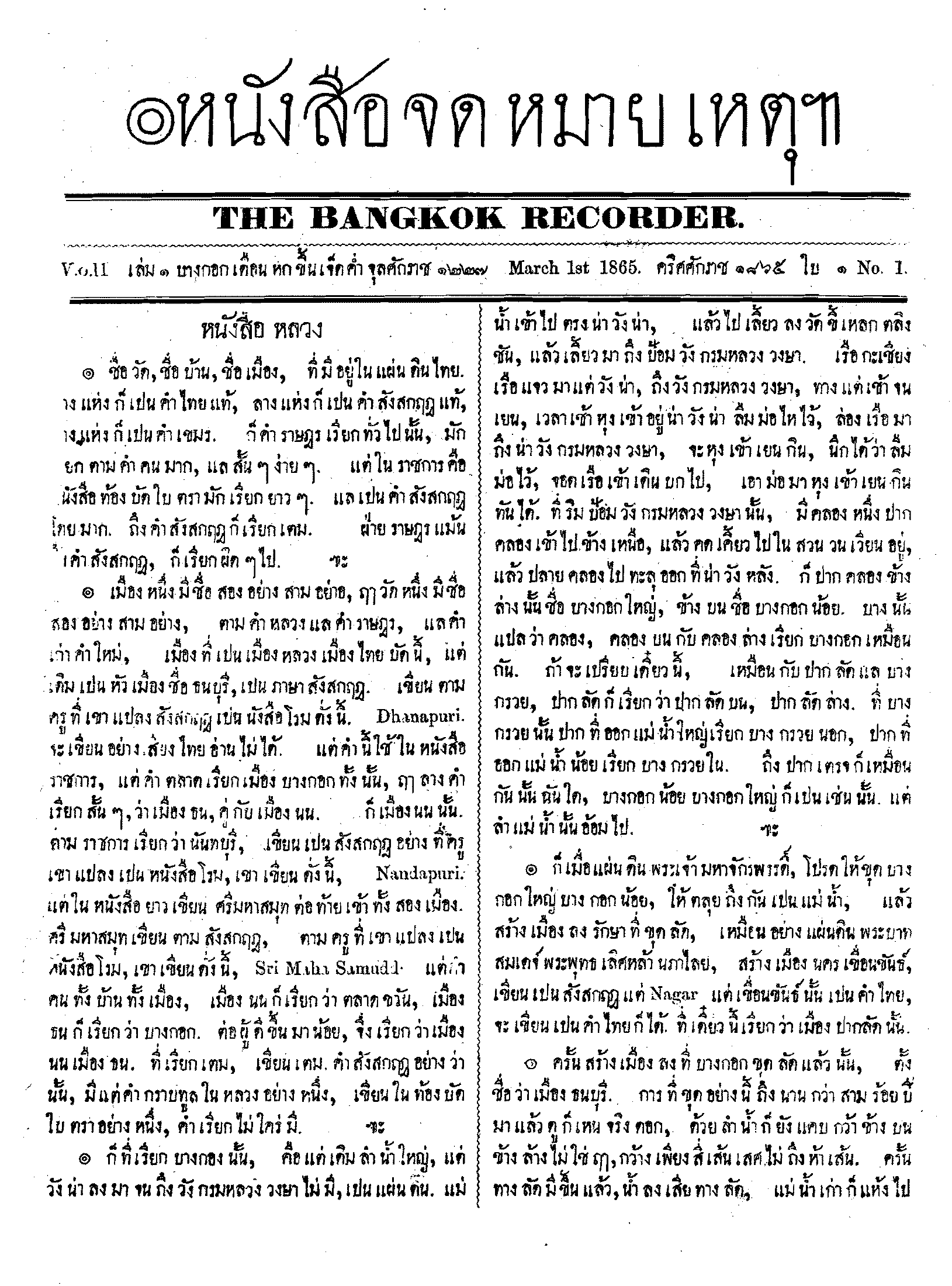
- March 1, 1865 issue of The Bangkok Recorder
- Type: Monthly newspaper (1844-1845); Bi-weekly newspaper (1865-1867)
- Owner: Dan Beach Bradley
- Publisher: Dan Beach Bradley
- Editor: Dan Beach Bradley
- Founded: 1844
- Ceased publication: 1867
- Language: Thai
- Headquarters: Bangkok, Thailand

The Bangkok Recorder (Thai: บางกอกรีกอเดอ or หนังสือจดหมายเหตุ) was the first Thai-language newspaper, first published monthly, and later bi-weekly, in Bangkok, Siam between July 4, 1844, and October 1845 in Thai only, and between January 16, 1865, and February 16, 1867, both in Thai and English. It was written and published by Dr. Dan Beach Bradley, an American Christian missionary who spent 35 years in the country.

Bradley published both English- and Thai-language editions of The Bangkok Recorder. The Thai edition measured 6 by 9 inches (150 mm × 230 mm), and the English edition 12 by 18 inches (300 mm × 460 mm). The newspaper had a two-column layout.

One-time subscribers of The Bangkok Recorder included King Mongkut and various Thai nobles. The newspaper eventually closed due to unprofitability. Bradley wrote in the paper urging subscribers to pay their fees. Lack of payment may have been the result of disapproval of Bradley's subject matter. In addition to local and foreign news, Bradley wrote on general topics, including science and politics. His writings on Christianity and Buddhism may have been perceived as critical of the dominant religion.

== See also ==
- Timeline of English-language newspapers published in Thailand
- List of online newspaper archives - Thailand
