= Cornelius Beach Bradley =

American scholar (1843–1936)

- Born: November 18, 1843; Bangkok, Siam
- Died: February 18, 1936 (aged 92); Berkeley, California, US
- Occupation: Professor
- Spouse: Mary Sarepta Comings (1844–1921)
- Children: Bertha Bradley Warbasse (1872-1921); Harold Cornelius Bradley (1878-1976)
- Parent(s): Dan Beach Bradley; Emelie Royce

Cornelius Beach Bradley (November 18, 1843 – February 18, 1936) was an American English-language scholar. He served as professor of rhetoric at the University of California, Berkeley (then called the University of California), and also extensively studied the Thai language.

Bradley was born and grew up in Siam, the son of missionary Dan Beach Bradley, and also did missionary work in the country after graduating from Oberlin College in the United States. He returned to the United States in 1874, becoming a teacher and vice-principal at Oakland High School, before joining the faculty of the University of California in 1882. He was also known for mountaineering, especially in the Sierra Nevada.

Bradley was the father of Harold Cornelius Bradley, a professor of biochemistry at UW-Madison, and grandfather of Charles C. Bradley, a professor of geology at Montana State College.

== Thai language research ==
Bradley was a first language speaker of Thai and did some of the earliest linguistic analysis of the language, including studies of its tones, vowels, and writing system.
