= Sand County Foundation =

Sand County Foundation is a non-profit private land conservation organization located in Madison, Wisconsin, United States. Founded in 1965, its work is inspired by world-renowned conservationist Aldo Leopold’s land ethic.

== Mission ==
To advance the use of ethical and scientifically sound land management practices and partnerships for the benefit of people and their rural landscapes.

== Programs ==
=== Leopold Conservation Award ===
The Leopold Conservation Award of $10,000 and a crystal award recognizes private landowners who practice responsible land stewardship and management. Started in 2003, this program has expanded to 24 states as of 2022 including California, Colorado, Kansas, Kentucky, Missouri, Nebraska, North Dakota, Oklahoma, South Dakota, Texas, Utah, Wisconsin, and Wyoming

=== Agricultural Conservation ===
The Agricultural Incentives Program is composed of various projects throughout the midwest focused on reducing nutrient runoff associated with agriculture. The program emphasizes watershed-scale projects and works with the agricultural community on research based solutions to address nutrient runoff.

== Previous Projects ==
Examples of projects the Foundation has undertaken:

- The Coastal Louisiana Restoration received the United States Environmental Protection Agency's Gulf Guardian Award in the Civic/Non-profit category.
- Beginning in 1999, Sand County Foundation became involved in the restoration of Wisconsin's Baraboo River. The restoration project removed dams to restore the flow of the river.
- The Cooperative Sagebrush Initiative began in 2006 and concluded in 2013. The project united western land users to conserve and restore the sagebrush ecosystem across portions of 11 western states.
