= Aldo Leopold =

American conservationist (1887–1948)

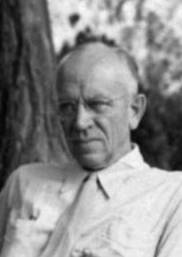
- Leopold in 1946
- Born: January 11, 1887; Burlington, Iowa, U.S.
- Died: April 21, 1948 (aged 61); Baraboo, Wisconsin, U.S.
- Resting place: Aspen Grove Cemetery; Burlington, Iowa, U.S.
- Education: Yale University
- Occupations: Author; ecologist; forester; professor; nature writer
- Spouse: Estella Leopold
- Children: A. Starker Leopold, Luna Leopold, Nina Leopold Bradley, A. Carl Leopold, Estella Leopold
- Writing career
- Subjects: Conservation, land ethic, land health, ecological conscience
- Notable work: A Sand County Almanac
- Website: www.aldoleopold.org

Aldo Leopold (January 11, 1887 – April 21, 1948) was an American writer, philosopher, naturalist, scientist, ecologist, forester, professor, conservationist, and environmentalist. He taught at the University of Wisconsin and is best known for his book A Sand County Almanac (1949), which has been translated into fifteen languages and has sold more than two million copies.

Leopold was influential in the development of modern environmental ethics and in the movement for wilderness conservation. His ethics of nature and wildlife preservation had a profound impact on the environmental movement, with his ecocentric or holistic ethics regarding land. He emphasized biodiversity and ecology and was a founder of the science of wildlife management.

== Early life ==
Rand Aldo Leopold was born in Burlington, Iowa, on January 11, 1887. His father, Carl Leopold, was a businessman who made walnut desks and was first cousin to his wife, Clara Starker. Charles Starker, who was Carl's father and Clara's uncle, came to the United States from Germany and studied engineering and architecture. Rand Aldo was named after two of his father's business partners—C. W. Rand and Aldo Sommers—although he eventually dropped the use of "Rand". The Leopold family included younger siblings Mary Luize, Carl Starker, and Frederic. Leopold's first language was German, although he mastered English at an early age.

Aldo Leopold's early life was highlighted by the outdoors. Carl would take his children on excursions into the woods and taught his oldest son woodcraft and hunting. Aldo showed an aptitude for observation, spending hours counting and cataloging birds near his home. His sister Mary later said that even as a young child, "He was very much an outdoorsman, even in his extreme youth. He was always out climbing around the bluffs, or going down to the river, or going across the river into the woods." He attended Prospect Hill Elementary, where he ranked at the top of his class, and then, the overcrowded Burlington High School. Every August, the family vacationed in Michigan on the forested Marquette Island in Lake Huron, which the children took to exploring.

== Schooling ==
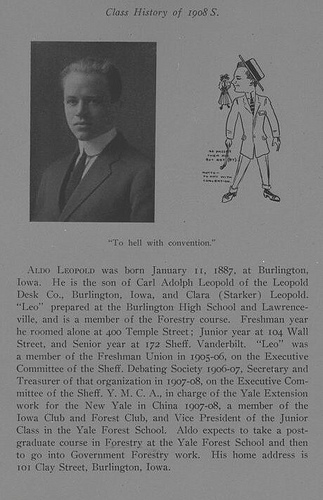
Leopold's entry in the Yale Sheffield Scientific School yearbook, 1908

In 1900, Gifford Pinchot, head of the new Division of Forestry in the Department of Agriculture, donated money to Yale University to begin one of the nation's first forestry schools. Hearing of this development, teenage Leopold decided he wanted to become a forester. His parents agreed to let him attend The Lawrenceville School, a preparatory college in New Jersey, to improve his chances of admission to Yale. The Burlington High School principal wrote in a reference letter to the headmaster at Lawrenceville saying that Leopold was "as earnest a boy as we have in school... painstaking in his work.... Moral character above reproach." He arrived at his new school in January 1904, shortly before he turned 17. He was considered an attentive student, although he was again drawn to the outdoors. Lawrenceville was suitably rural, and Leopold spent much time mapping the area and studying its wildlife. Leopold studied at the Lawrenceville School for a year, during which time he was accepted to Yale. Since the Yale School of Forestry granted only graduate degrees, Leopold first enrolled in Sheffield Scientific School's preparatory forestry courses for his undergraduate studies, in New Haven, Connecticut. While Leopold was able to explore the woods and fields of Lawrenceville daily, sometimes to the detriment of his studying, at Yale he had little opportunity to do so; his studies and social life made his outdoor trips few and far between. Leopold graduated from the Yale Forestry School in 1909.

== Career ==
In 1909, Leopold was assigned to the Forest Service's District 3 in the Arizona and New Mexico territories. At first, he was a forest assistant at the Apache National Forest in the Arizona Territory. In 1911, he was transferred to the Carson National Forest in northern New Mexico. Leopold was stationed in New Mexico until 1924 because he was developing the first comprehensive management plan for the Grand Canyon, writing the Forest Service's first game and fish handbook, and proposing Gila Wilderness Area, the first wilderness area in the Forest Service system. Furthermore, Leopold encouraged many changes within New Mexico and Arizona through his time spent in the region developing these plans.

=== Game Protection Association initiatives ===
In 1916, Leopold conducted a speaking tour across New Mexico to encourage the formation of wildlife protection associations among local sportsmen. The tour began in Silver City, where Leopold met Miles W. Buford, who went on to establish the Sportsmen's Association of Southwestern New Mexico. Leopold proposed the creation of a statewide organization, the New Mexico Game Protection Association (NMGPA), which gained support in several cities including Rincon, El Paso, Alamogordo, Cloudcroft, Carlsbad, Roswell, and Albuquerque. In March 1916, the NMGPA held its first convention, attracting over 1,000 members. The association adopted three goals: removing game warden appointments from political influence, establishing game refuges within national forests, and implementing a balance of predators.

Following the formation of the NMGPA, Leopold returned to his duties with the U.S. Forest Service. After the passage of the Term Permit Act, he began siting and surveying locations in Arizona for private recreational development. During this time, he also promoted and helped establish Game Protection Associations in Arizona towns such as Flagstaff, Springerville, Tucson, and Payson.

=== Albuquerque Chamber of Commerce ===
In January 1918, Leopold became Secretary of the Albuquerque Chamber of Commerce. In this role, he supported various initiatives, including the inclusion of labor organizations in the chamber, the promotion of Hispanic and Pueblo architectural styles, and the drainage of parts of the Rio Grande Valley to expand agricultural land.

=== Watershed initiatives ===
Leopold rejoined the Forest Service on August 1, 1919, as Assistant District Forester in Charge of Operations, overseeing Region 3, which included 11 national forests. During this period, he became concerned with soil erosion in areas such as the Prescott and Carson National Forests. In December 1923, he authored The Watershed Handbook, a guide for field staff addressing watershed management and recommending the regulation of livestock based on watershed conditions.

Just a few months into his new role, Leopold's superior, District Forester Paul Redington, left Region 3 and was succeeded by Frank C. W. Pooler—who openly expressed doubts about Leopold's suitability for the position. Pooler even arranged a new post for Leopold in a different region. However, Leopold stood his ground and declined the offer, choosing to stay in Albuquerque and New Mexico, where his family and numerous ongoing projects were deeply rooted.

=== Grand Canyon management plan ===
Leopold's management plan was visionary for its time, emphasizing sustainable use and ecological preservation. He planned to make regulations with tourism, resource protection, recreational planning, and the long-term vision of the park. He felt that there needed to be a control of commercial enterprises, such as shops and concessions because he described them as "repugnant" to the canyon's natural character. He suggested there should be designated areas for visitor facilities to minimize environmental disruption. Additionally, He advocated for the cleanup of garbage and sewage to restore the Colorado River's water quality. Previously, there was history of people dumping garbage in the river. He emphasized preserving the canyon's geological and ecological features, including its stratified rock formations and native flora and fauna. Leopold's plan for recreational planning was to outline strategies for “primitive recreation,” such as hiking, hunting, and fishing, to allow visitors to experience the canyon's wilderness without degrading it. He recommended trail development to improve access while protecting sensitive areas. Finally, his long-term vision was to prioritized the “greatest good for the greatest number in the long run,” aligning with U.S. Forest Service principles. He laid the groundwork for future park management by advocating for a balance between human enjoyment and ecological health.

=== U.S. Forest Service Game and Fish Handbook ===
Wildlife management was largely unregulated, with game and fish populations often depleted due to overhunting, habitat destruction, and lack of coordinated oversight. Leopold recognized the need for a systematic approach to manage wildlife resources. In the handbook, Leopold detailed a section on wildlife population management where he provided a guideline for monitoring and regulating game species, such as deer, elk, and fish, to prevent overharvesting. He emphasized sustainable hunting and fishing practices to maintain population health. Additionally, he wrote a section on habitat conservation which he stressed the importance of preserving habitats, including forests, rivers, and wetlands, to support wildlife. He included recommendations for mitigating the impacts of grazing and logging on game and fish habitats. In a section about ecological balance, he introduced early concepts of predator-prey dynamics reflecting on his observations of ecological consequences when predators like wolves were eradicated. He advocated for a holistic approach to land management considering wildlife as part of the broader ecosystem. Finally, he outlined protocols for U.S. Forest Service rangers to collect data on wildlife populations and enforce regulations. He proposed coordination with local communities and hunters to promote conservation awareness.

=== Gila Wilderness Area ===
In 1921, Leopold published an article in the Journal of Forestry titled “The Wilderness and Its Place in Forest Recreational Policy,” arguing for the preservation of roadless areas within national forests. He proposed the Gila as a prime candidate, envisioning it as a space free from roads, motorized vehicles, and industrial development. He defined wilderness as “a continuous stretch of country preserved in its natural state, open to lawful hunting and fishing, big enough to absorb a two weeks’ pack trip, and kept devoid of roads, artificial trails, cottages, or other works of man.” As a Forest Service supervisor in District 3, Leopold worked with colleagues like Fred Winn and Don Johnston to survey the Gila and develop a management plan. He recommended setting aside 750,000 acres of the Gila National Forest headwaters, an area characterized by canyons, mesas, and diverse wildlife, including elk, deer, and trout. Leopold's proposal gained traction, and in 1924, the Forest Service approved the designation of 755,000 acres as the Gila Wilderness Area, the first such area in the world. Leopold saw the Gila as a living laboratory for ecological health, where natural processes like predator-prey dynamics could unfold without human interference. This reflected his early understanding of trophic cascades, later detailed in his essay “Thinking Like a Mountain.” He also valued the Gila for its cultural significance, offering a space for Americans to reconnect with the frontier experience through self-reliant recreation.

On April 5, 1923, he was elected an associate member (now called "professional member") of the Boone and Crockett Club, a wildlife conservation organization founded by Theodore Roosevelt and George Bird Grinnell.

In 1924, he accepted transfer to the U.S. Forest Products Laboratory in Madison, Wisconsin, and became an associate director.

In 1933, he was appointed Professor of Game Management in the Agricultural Economics Department at the University of Wisconsin, the first such professorship of wildlife management. At the same time he was named Research Director of the University of Wisconsin–Madison Arboretum. Leopold and other members of the first Arboretum Committee initiated a research agenda around re-establishing "original Wisconsin" landscape and plant communities, particularly those that predated European settlement, such as tallgrass prairie and oak savanna.

Under the Oberlaender Trust of the Carl Schurz Memorial Foundation, Leopold was part of the 1935 group of six U.S. Forest Service associates who toured the forests of Germany and Austria. Leopold was invited specifically to study game management, and this was his first and only time abroad. His European observations would have a significant impact on his ecological thinking, leading him to view the German policies in favor of blocks of monoculture trees in straight lines as a cautionary tale leading to soil degradation and an overall loss of biodiversity.

After 1935, Leopold was no longer working for the U.S. Forest Service; he had left the agency in 1928 to work independently and later became a professor at the University of Wisconsin.

== Family life and death ==
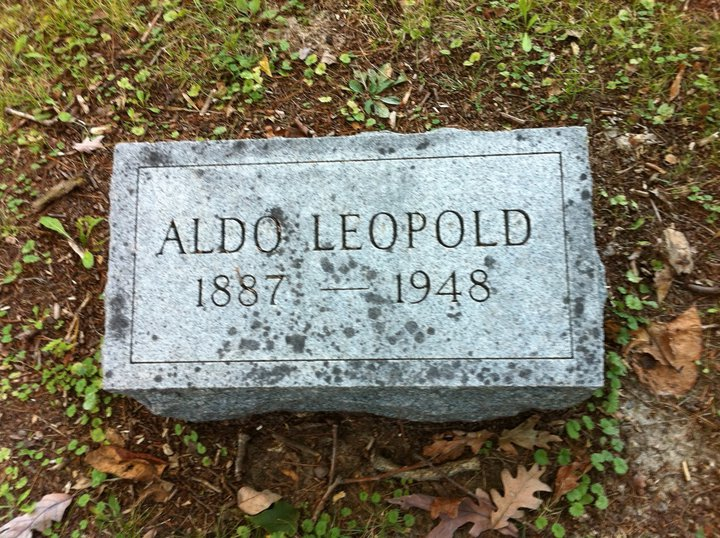
Leopold's headstone at his family plot in Aspen Grove Cemetery in Burlington, Iowa

Leopold married Estella Bergere, the daughter of a well known ranching family in New Mexico, in northern New Mexico in 1912 and they had five children together. They lived in a modest two-story home close to the UW–Madison campus. His children followed in his footsteps as teachers and naturalists: Aldo Starker Leopold (1913–1983) was a wildlife biologist and professor at UC Berkeley; Luna B. Leopold (1915–2006) became a hydrologist and geology professor at UC Berkeley; Nina Leopold Bradley (1917–2011) was a researcher and naturalist; Aldo Carl Leopold (1919–2009) was a plant physiologist, who taught at Purdue University for 25 years; and daughter Estella Leopold (1927–2024) was a noted botanist and conservationist and professor emerita at the University of Washington.

Leopold purchased 80 acres in the sand country of central Wisconsin. The once-forested region had been logged, swept by repeated fires, overgrazed by dairy cows, and left barren. He put his theories to work in the field and eventually set to work writing his best-selling A Sand County Almanac (1949) which was finished just prior to his death. Aldo Leopold died from a heart attack on April 21, 1948, while helping his neighbors control a grass fire by his farm in Baraboo, Wisconsin.

Leopold's home is an official landmark of the city of Madison.

== Ideas ==
Early on, Leopold was assigned to hunt and kill bears, wolves, and mountain lions in New Mexico. Local ranchers hated these predators because of livestock losses, but Leopold came to respect the animals. One day after fatally shooting a wolf, Leopold reached the animal and was transfixed by a "fierce green fire dying in her eyes." That experience changed him and put him on the path toward an ecocentric outlook. He developed an ecological ethic that replaced the earlier wilderness ethic that stressed the need for human dominance. His rethinking the importance of predators in the balance of nature has resulted in the return of bears and mountain lions to New Mexico wilderness areas.

By the early 1920s, Leopold had concluded that a particular kind of preservation should be embraced in the national forests of the American West. He was prompted to this by the rampant building of roads to accommodate the "proliferation of the automobile" and the related increasingly heavy recreational demands placed on public lands. He was the first to employ the term "wilderness" to describe such preservation. Over the next two decades, he added ethical and scientific rationales to his defense of the wilderness concept. Leopold believed that it is easier to maintain wilderness than to create it. In one essay, he rhetorically asked, "Of what avail are forty freedoms without a blank spot on the map?" Leopold saw a progress of ethical sensitivity from interpersonal relationships, to relationships to society as a whole, to relationships with the land, leading to a steady diminution of actions based on expediency, conquest, and self-interest. Leopold thus rejected the utilitarianism of conservationists such as Theodore Roosevelt.

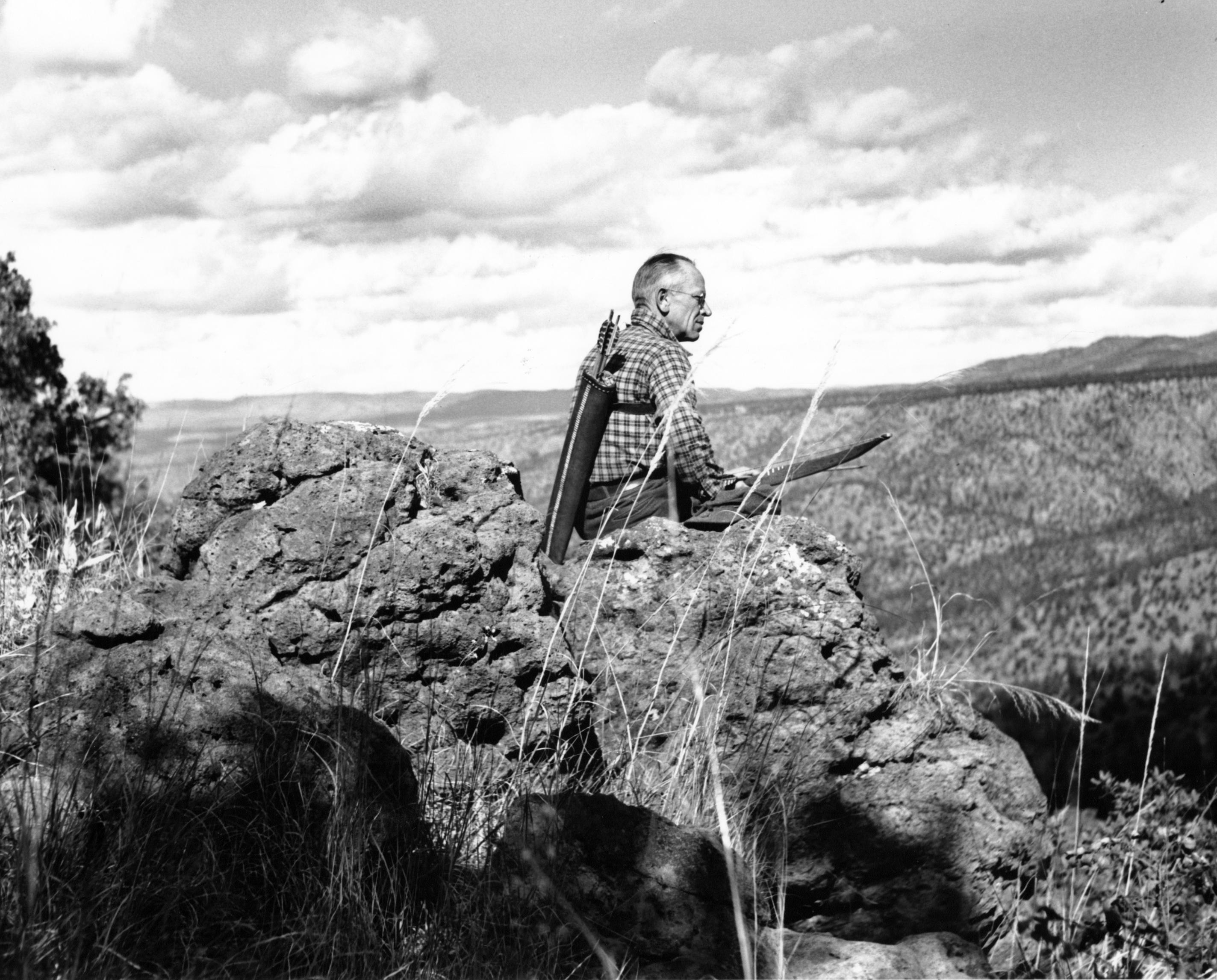
Aldo Leopold with quiver and bow seated on rimrock above the Rio Gavilan in northern Mexico while on a bow hunting trip in 1938

By the 1930s, Leopold had become one of the first Americans to publish extensively on the startup discipline of wildlife management. He advocated the scientific management of wildlife habitats by both public and private landholders rather than a reliance on game refuges, hunting laws, and other methods intended to protect specific species of desired game. In his 1933 book Game Management, Leopold defined the science of wildlife management as "the art of making land produce sustained annual crops of wild game for recreational use." But, as Curt Meine has pointed out, he also considered it to be a technique for restoring and maintaining diversity in the environment.

The concept of "wilderness" also took on a new meaning; Leopold no longer saw it as a hunting or recreational ground, but as an arena for a healthy biotic community, including wolves and mountain lions. In 1935, he helped found the Wilderness Society, dedicated to expanding and protecting the nation's wilderness areas. He regarded the society as "one of the focal points of a new attitude—an intelligent humility toward Man's place in nature." Science writer Connie Barlow says Leopold wrote eloquently from a perspective that today would be called Religious Naturalism.

Though often forgotten, thinking about population dynamics and consumption also shaped Leopold's ecological vision in profound ways. By studying wildlife population fluctuations, Leopold extended many of the ideas about carrying capacity and environmental degradation that Raymond Pearl and Edward Murray East had articulated, and these ideas, in turn, shaped his path-breaking ideas of ecological interconnection. Moreover, although later readers associate Leopold with wildlife ecology, his career helps show how Malthusian ideas of human society intertwined and overlapped with ideas of nature. He was greatly influenced by ecologists who themselves gleaned ideas from Malthusian models of human society, and himself often thought of human events—especially the Great Depression and World War II—in terms of the models of population and consumption that he was developing for animals.

One of the most influential books for Leopold during that period was Our Vanishing Wildlife by William Temple Hornaday. As one of the earliest works dedicated entirely to the threats facing wild game populations this book significantly shaped Leopold's views. The book sharpened his focus on the importance of game protection, a concern that would remain central to his thinking for many years to come.

== Nature writing ==
Aldo Leopold's place in the world of nature writing is poised at a pivotal juncture in history, drawing from the writings of Henry David Thoreau and other 19th century thinkers, while also laying the groundwork for contemporary authors such as Kathleen Dean Moore, Wendell Berry, and Scott Russell Sanders; according to Sanders, "Aldo Leopold remains a vital figure for us today … because he analyzed the sources of ecological damage with unprecedented clarity, and he wrote about possible remedies as compellingly as any American ever has.”

Leopold's nature writing is notable for its simple directness. His portrayals of various natural environments through which he had moved, or had known for many years, displayed impressive intimacy with what exists and happens in nature. This includes detailed diaries and journals of his Forest Service activity, hunting and field experience, as well as observations and activities at his Sand County farm. He offered frank criticism of the harm he believed was frequently done to natural systems (such as land) out of a sense of a culture or society's sovereign ownership over the land base – eclipsing any sense of a community of life to which humans belong. He felt the security and prosperity resulting from "mechanization" now gives people the time to reflect on the preciousness of nature and to learn more about what happens there; however, he also wrote, "Theoretically, the mechanization of farming ought to cut the farmer's chains, but whether it really does is debatable."

=== A Sand County Almanac ===
The book was published in 1949, shortly after Leopold's death. It was structured in a series of monthly essays where he went in depth about land ethics and nature. Several of these monthly essays were accompanied with sketches from the different landscapes and plants he found. Additionally, he would have philosophical segments that would contribute to his land ethic concepts. One of the well-known quotes from the book which clarifies his land ethic is,

A thing is right when it tends to preserve the integrity, stability, and beauty of the biotic community. It is wrong when it tends otherwise. (p. 262)

The concept of a trophic cascade is put forth in the chapter, "Thinking Like a Mountain", wherein Leopold realizes that killing a predatory wolf carries serious implications for the rest of the ecosystem — a conclusion that found sympathetic appreciation generations later:

In January 1995 I helped carry the first grey wolf into Yellowstone, where they had been eradicated by federal predator control policy only six decades earlier. Looking through the crates into her eyes, I reflected on how Aldo Leopold once took part in that policy, then eloquently challenged it. By illuminating for us how wolves play a critical role in the whole of creation, he expressed the ethic and the laws which would reintroduce them nearly a half-century after his death.

— Bruce Babbitt, former Secretary of the Interior

Thinking Like a Mountain was originally written during World War II and shows that Leopold's thinking was shaped by that global cataclysm.

=== Land ethic ===
In "The Land Ethic", a chapter in A Sand County Almanac, Leopold delves into conservation in "The Ecological Conscience" section. He wrote: "Conservation is a state of harmony between men and land." He noted that conservation guidelines at the time boiled down to: "obey the law, vote right, join some organizations, and practice what conservation is profitable on your own land; the government will do the rest." (p. 243–244)

Leopold explained:

The land ethic simply enlarges the boundaries of the community to include soils, waters, plants, and animals, or collectively: the land. This sounds simple: do we not already sing our love for and obligation to the land of the free and the home of the brave? Yes, but just what and whom do we love? Certainly not the soil, which we are sending helter-skelter down river. Certainly not the waters, which we assume have no function except to turn turbines, float barges, and carry off sewage. Certainly not the plants, of which we exterminate whole communities without batting an eye. Certainly not the animals, of which we have already extirpated many of the largest and most beautiful species. A land ethic of course cannot prevent the alteration, management, and use of these 'resources,' but it does affirm their right to continued existence, and, at least in spots, their continued existence in a natural state. In short, a land ethic changes the role of Homo sapiens from conqueror of the land-community to plain member and citizen of it. It implies respect for his fellow-members, and also respect for the community as such.

=== Marshland Elegy ===
In "Marshland Elegy", an excerpt from A Sand County Almanac, Leopold describes the process of destruction for American marshland as well as the efforts to reinvigorate those marshlands after that destruction. Leopold speak both to the way in which the halting of farmland development in these areas represents positive change for the cranes and other wildlife that relies on marshes as well as the limitations of the strategies implemented by conservationists in the issue. Leopold criticized conservation strategy in that to make the public cherish the communities we conserve they need to "see and fondle" them which can make the conservation effort self-defeating.

At the time this essay was written Sandhill Cranes had dwindled to merely 25 breeding pairs in Wisconsin, luckily since then the crane population has recovered with the midwest now being home to over 15,000 sandhill cranes. These efforts were inspired by this essay and carried out by the Aldo Leopold foundation. These efforts give a positive example to be looked to for future conservation efforts.

=== Game Management ===
Game Management was published in 1933, establishing Leopold as one of the leaders and founders of wildlife preservation and ecology.This book was used in his teachings at The University of Wisconsin and led the groundwork for describing methods of how to restore and manage ecosystems using the same tools and methods that were used to destroy them. Game Management is deemed Leopold's most important work as it founded a new science by combining the likes of agriculture, biology, ecology, and other sciences. This book brought about a revolution within conservation and placed Leopold as the founder of the Department of Game Management at The University of Wisconsin. For more than 40 years after its publication, it was the leading textbook in the field of wildlife management.

=== The River of the Mother of God and Other Essays ===
Published nearly 45 years after the death of Leopold, The River of the Mother of God, includes 59 essays drawn from Leopold's unpublished manuscripts found at The University of Wisconsin and Leopold's overlooked published work. This collection is titled after one of Leopold's most popular essays from 1924, “The River of the Mother of God,” but it spans Leopold's life discussing themes of wilderness preservation, ecology, agriculture, land ethics, and natural esthetics from his teenage years until his last years. This work dives into a deeper view of Leopold and shows the lasting impact he made on the field of conservation.

=== A Man's Leisure Time ===
In A Sand County Almanac, Aldo Leopold's essay “A Man’s Leisure Time” provides us with an examination of how leisure enriches our lives by deepening our connection with nature. Leopold believed that how one spends their free time is an indicator of one's intelligence and character. Leopold states, “How miserable are the idle hours of the ignorant man!” contributing to his idea that leisure time is meaningful and it is important to take in the nature around when presented with the opportunity.

According to Leopold, leisure activities should not be relaxing time but ways to achieve personal growth and understanding. He describes hobbies as "a defiance of the contemporary," suggesting that they allow individuals to step away from the relentless pace of modern life and engage in activities that are rewarding and enriching. Leopold highlights that such pursuits, whether it's collecting fossils or cultivating a garden, can lead to a profound appreciation of the land and how important and amazing nature is.

In this chapter, Mr.Leopold encourages the reader to consider what they do with their free or leisure time in their life. Leopold advocates for activities that promote a deeper understanding of the natural world.

== Legacy ==
In 1933, Aldo Leopold became Professor of Game Management at the University of Wisconsin-Madison, the first position of its kind in the country. Through his contributions to and knowledge of the field, he developed curricula and ran the program, which was eventually redubbed Wildlife Ecology.

"Game Management" during this time meant the scientific study and the practical application of techniques for maintaining a healthy wildlife population, especially those that are hunted for sport. Through his expertise, the area of wildlife management grew from just managing populations within life to a larger egocialcal approach to managing wildlife population.

Game management was a branch of conservation biology to Aldo Leopold. He was concerned about the whole ecological balance of the environment and not just one species. He created a field that was hit every area ecology, policy, forestry, and ethics. He even published a textbook for his class titled "Game management" in 1933.

In 1950 The Wildlife Society honored Leopold by creating an annual award in his name.

In 1965, the Sand County Foundation was founded in response to Leopold's book "A Sand County Almanac." The Sand County Foundation is a non-profit organization that provides farmers, forestland owners, and other private land owners with environmental and crop production data to encourage effective agricultural and environmental techniques within The United States. Furthermore, the foundation formed a Leopold Conservation Award to recognize farmers, forestland owners, and private land owners for inspirational conservation efforts and leadership within land ethics.

The Aldo Leopold Foundation of Baraboo, Wisconsin, was founded in 1982 by Aldo and Estella Leopold's five children as a 501(c)3 not-for-profit conservation organization whose mission is "to foster the land ethic through the legacy of Aldo Leopold". The Aldo Leopold Foundation owns and manages the original Aldo Leopold Shack and Farm and 300 surrounding acres, in addition to several other parcels. Its headquarters is the green-built Leopold Center where it conducts educational and land stewardship programs. The foundation also acts as the executor of Leopold's literary estate, encourages scholarship on Leopold, and serves as a clearinghouse for information regarding Leopold, his work, and his ideas. It provides interpretive resources and tours for thousands of visitors annually, distributes a curriculum about how to use Leopold's writing and ideas in environmental education. The center maintains a robust website and numerous print resources. In 2012, in collaboration with the United States Forest Service, the foundation and the Center for Humans and Nature released the first full-length film about Leopold, titled Green Fire: Aldo Leopold and a Land Ethic for Our Time. The film aired on public television stations across the nation and won a Midwest regional Emmy award in the documentary category.

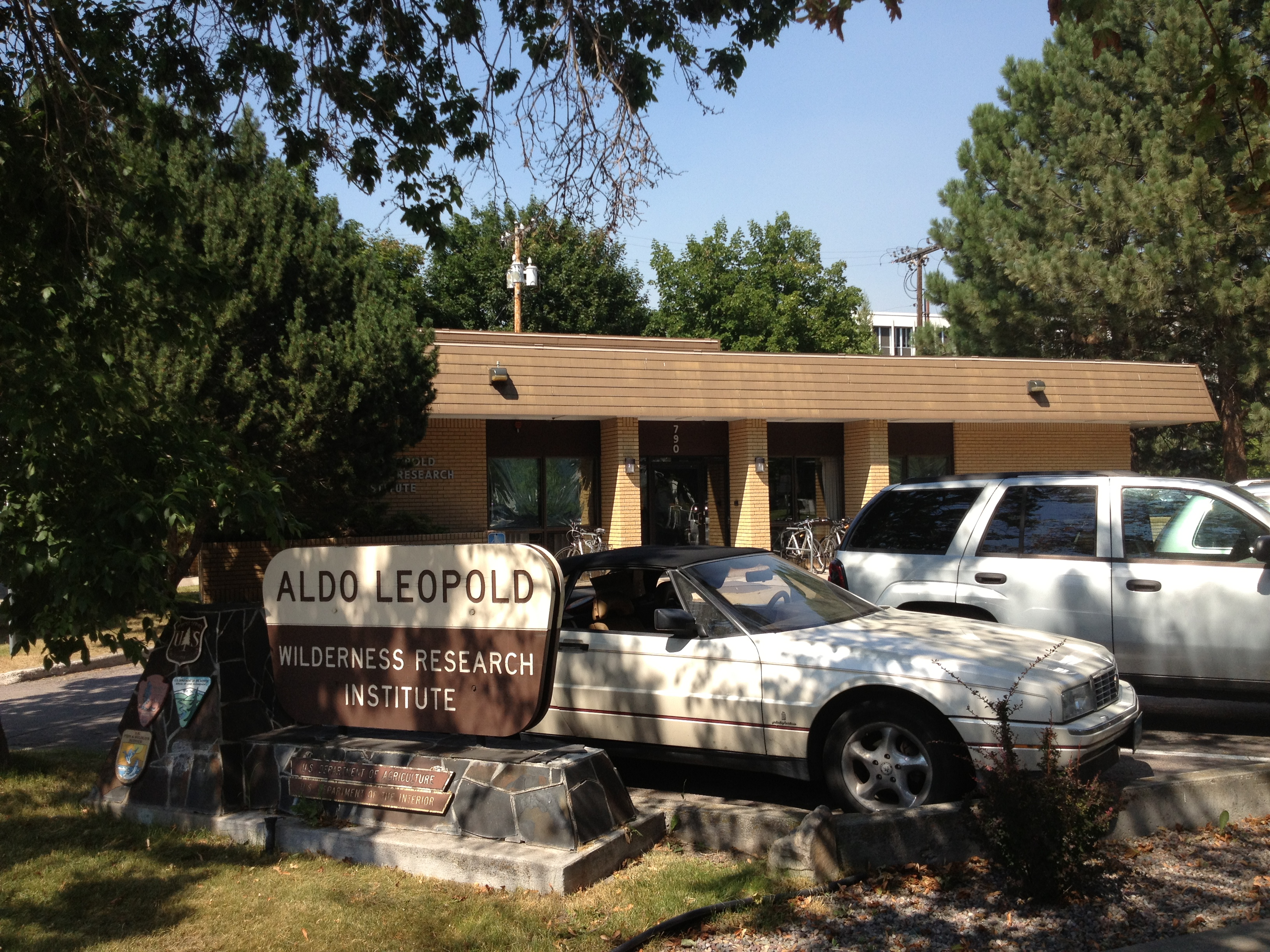
Aldo Leopold Wilderness Research Institute

The Aldo Leopold Wilderness in New Mexico's Gila National Forest was named after him in 1980.

The Leopold Center for Sustainable Agriculture was established in 1987 at Iowa State University in Ames. It was named in honor of Leopold. Since its founding, it has pioneered new forms of sustainable agriculture practices.

The U.S. Forest Service established the Aldo Leopold Wilderness Research Institute at the University of Montana, Missoula in 1993. It is "the only Federal research group in the United States dedicated to the development and dissemination of knowledge needed to improve management of wilderness, parks, and similarly protected areas."

The Aldo Leopold Neighborhood Historic District, which includes Leopold's former home in Albuquerque, New Mexico, was listed on the National Register of Historic Places in 2002.

The Aldo Leopold Legacy Trail System, a system of 42 state trails in Wisconsin, was created by the state in 2007 to honor Leopold's contributions to the conservation and outdoor recreation. This trail covers more than 1,700 miles across the state of Wisconsin. Many of the trails pass through forests, scenics natural areas, and state parks. There are signs, along the trails, to showcase information about Leopold's life, his conservation work, and natural information about the surrounding area.

The Leopold Center for Sustainable Agriculture in Iowa, created through the 1987 Iowa Groundwater Protection Act is committed to "new ways to farm profitably while conserving natural resources as well as reducing negative environmental and social impacts".

An organization, the Leopold Heritage Group, is "dedicated to promoting the global legacy of Aldo Leopold in his hometown of Burlington, Iowa." This groups preserves and shares Leopold's legacy by providing local events, educational programs, and conservation projects. The "Leopold Heritage Group", supports efforts to maintain Leopold-relates sites around the area for example, his childhood home and many places that he has explored as a child.

In 1985, Leopold was inducted along with John Muir, a naturalist and preservationist, as the first inductees to the Wisconsin Conservation Hall of Fame. The Hall of Fame is located in Stevens Point, Wisconsin, it was created to recognize the individuals who have made important contributions to conserving the natural state of resources around the state.

The Leopold Residence Hall at the University of Wisconsin-Madison was named after him. It opened in 2013.

Leopold's Preserve in Haymarket, Virginia was established in 2014. This preserve is a 380-acre park that is committed to preserving diverse ecosystems, natural scenes, and protecting threatened land from industrial and commercial development.

Aldo Leopold is well known for being the founder of wildlife management, he played a key role in establishing ethics in the wildlife world. He was a driving force behind the creation of the Gila National Forest Wilderness, and his legacy lives on today as the Gila National Forest has been standing strong since 1924, when the National Forest was created.

== Works ==
- Report on a Game Survey of the North Central States (Madison: SAAMI, 1931)
- Game Management (New York: Scribner's, 1933)
- A Sand County Almanac (New York: Oxford, 1949)
- Round River: From the Journals of Aldo Leopold (New York: Oxford, 1953)
- A Sand County Almanac and Other Writings on Ecology and Conservation (New York: Library of America, 2013). ISBN 978-1-59853-206-7

== See also ==
- Grey Owl
- Timeline of environmental events
- Land Ethic
- Sand County Foundation
- Yale School of Forestry & Environmental Studies
- Aldo Leopold Legacy Trail System
- Aldo Leopold Wilderness
- Leopold Wetland Management District
- Ian McTaggart-Cowan
- J. Drew Lanham
