= Buffalo River State Trail =

Rail trail

- Length: 36.4 mi (58.6 km)
- Location: Wisconsin, USA
- Designation: multi-use
- Trailheads: Fairchild, Wisconsin and Mondovi, Wisconsin
- Difficulty: easy
- Season: Year Round
- Surface: Railroad Ballast and limestone screenings
- Maintained by: Wisconsin Department of Natural Resources

The Buffalo River State Trail is a 36.4-mile (58.6 km) rail trail between Fairchild, Wisconsin and Mondovi, Wisconsin.

== Access ==
The trail is open year-round from 6 am to 11 pm. The trail is open to walkers, joggers, equestrians, ATV/UTV's, and bicyclists in the summer, and snowmobiling in the winter. It is designated as a multi-use trail and is open to the public.

The trail is free to walk or run, but cyclists and horseback riders require a trail pass, which may be purchased at several self-registration stations along the trail.

It is designated as a multi-use trail and is open to the public.

== History ==
The Buffalo River State Trail is built on a former railway corridor and follows the Buffalo River Valley. The Buffalo River (Wisconsin) derives its name from the early French explorers which named it Riviere de Beeufs, for the bison that once inhabited the area.

== See also ==
- List of rail trails
- What is a rail trail
- List of hiking trails in Wisconsin
- List of bike trails in Wisconsin
