= Nicolet State Trail =

Trail in Wisconsin, USA

Map

The Nicolet State Trail is an 89-mile state designated trail running through Nicolet National Forest in Florence, Forest, and Oconto Counties in Wisconsin.

== Route ==
The trail begins on West Park St. in Gillett, Wisconsin (44°53′32″N 88°19′04″W) and travels north through the Nicolet National Forest to the Michigan state line north of Tipler, Wisconsin (46°00′35″N 88°34′40″W).

== Access ==
The trail is primarily used by ATV's and UTV's during the summer, but is open to walking, jogging, bicycling, and horseback riding, as well. During the winter, the trail is the main corridor for snowmobiling, cross-country skiing, dog sledding, and snowshoeing. The trail is open to ATV use year-round in Florence and Forest Counties, but is only open to ATV use from May 1 to October 31 in Oconto County.

Horseback riding on the trail is open year-round in Florence County, from May 1 to the end of snowmobiling season in Forest County, and April 15 to November 10 in Oconto County.
