= Dan Beach Bradley =

American Protestant missionary to Siam (1804–1873)

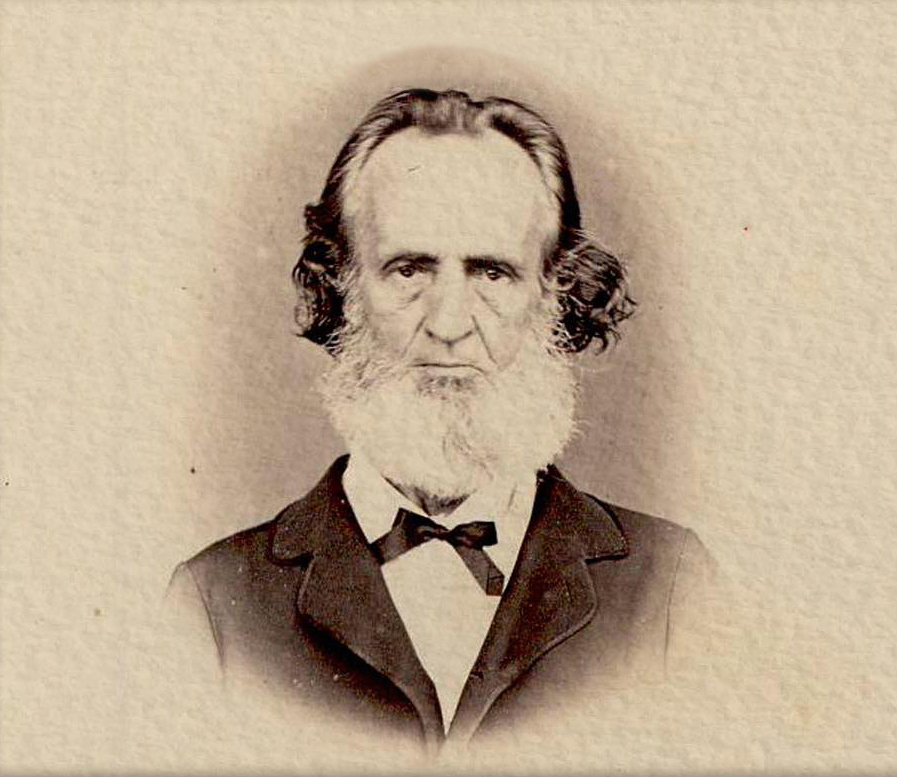
- Portrait in 1865
- Born: July 18, 1804; Marcellus, New York, U.S.
- Died: June 23, 1873 (aged 68); Bangkok, Siam
- Occupation: Medical missionary
- Years active: 1835 – 1873
- Organization: American Missionary Association
- Known for: small pox vaccination
- Spouses: Emelie Royce (m. 1834; died 1845) Sarah Blachly (m. 1848)
- Children: Cornelius; Harriet, died of small pox, age 8 months
- Parent(s): Dan Bradley; Eunice Beach

Dan Beach Bradley (July 18, 1804 – June 23, 1873) or known in Thai as Dr. Pladley (Note: Thai: หมอปลัดเล) was an American Protestant missionary to Siam from 1835 until his death. He is credited with numerous firsts, including, bringing the first Thai-script printing press to Siam, publishing the first Thai newspaper and monolingual Thai dictionary, performing the first surgery in Siam, and introducing Western medicine and technology.

== Early life ==
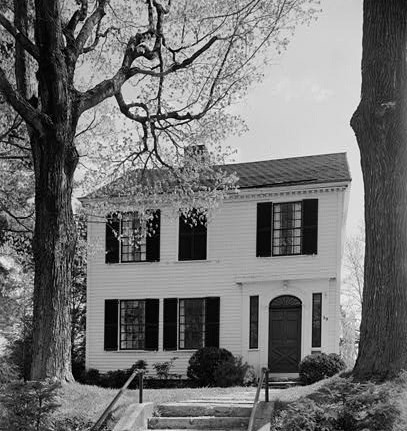
Dan Bradley House, Marcellus, NY

Dan Beach Bradley was born on 18 July 1804 in Marcellus, New York. He was the son of Judge and Pastor Dan Bradley of Whitehall, New York, and Eunice Beach. Eunice died soon after giving birth to her son. As a child, Dan Beach Bradley was an astounding scholar and he loved to read. When Bradley was 20 years old, he suffered a week of deafness and it caused him to examine his spiritual life. Two years after this incident, Bradley dedicated his life to serve Jesus Christ.

Bradley thought that his age was not appropriate to study for the ministry so he began studying medicine in the office of an Auburn physician. Bradley took a brief reprieve from his studies due to health concerns, but resumed his studies for a year in Penn Yan, New York. After a year of studying, Bradley attended lectures at Harvard University in 1830 before taking another break to earn money to continue his education. Bradley enrolled at New York University and graduated in April 1833 as a Doctor of Medicine.

In November 1832, he had been accepted as a missionary physician by the American Board of Commissioners for Foreign Missions (ABCFM). Bradley had initially wanted to marry one of his two cousins, Jane Bradley or Hannah Goodyear. Jane, however, was only 16 years old and was not in a position to marry Bradley and Goodyear had no desire to serve as a missionary in Asia. After a brief mail courtship, on 5 June 1834 Bradley married Emilie Royce before the couple set sail for Siam. Emilie, like Bradley, wanted to serve God as a missionary.

== Mission to Siam ==
On 2 July 1834, Bradley and his wife, Emilie departed from Boston for their mission to Bangkok. On 12 January 1835, they arrived in Singapore. Due to monsoons, Bradley and his wife stayed in an unoccupied London Missionary Society home for six months, until the storms finally passed. Bradley and his wife arrived in Siam on 18 July 1835 after an encounter with Malay pirates that left goods stolen and four crew members dead. They had the following children: Charles Bradley born March 1835 in transit, died 4 November 1836 in Bangkok; Emelie Jane Bradley, born 26 November 1836 in Marcellus, New York, died 27 July 1848 in Bangkok; Sophia Bradley McGilvary (8 October 1839 - 5 July 1923); Harriet Bradley born 7 May 1842, died in Bangkok 30 December 1842 of smallpox. Their last child was Cornelius Beach Bradley (18 November 1843 – 17 March 1936). Emilie Royce Bradley died on 2 August 1845 of tuberculosis. Her papers included an album and two diaries (1827-1830; 1831-1833; 1840-1842) kept in Clinton, New York. Those in Bangkok include a microfilm copy and a modern transcription of a diary (1834-1836), the original of which may still remain in private hands; a journal letter written aboard ship during her voyage to Siam in 1834-1835; and a record book containing summaries of letters sent. The summaries often refer to "my large letter book", probably indicating that only a portion of Emilie's correspondence has survived.

During his first few years in Thailand, Bradley suffered from chronic diarrhea, a sickness that he said had to happen initially in order to survive. After his initial sickness, he enjoyed 30 years of almost unbroken good health. He established a daily routine of cold baths, plain food, and total abstinence from intoxicating beverages. A healthy variety of cares enabled him to find rest by turning from one task to another. Throughout his time in Thailand, he was constantly found singing hymns, reading the bible, and in prayer.

== Life as a missionary ==
During his time as a missionary, Bradley was frequently at odds with his mission sponsors. On 4 December 1847, Bradley resigned from the ABCFM due to his disagreement with the organization on the doctrine of Christian perfectionism. With no funds coming from the ABCFM, Bradley was forced to take a three−year sojourn in the US to raise funds to continue in Bangkok under the sponsorship of another organization. His time in America raising funds and betrothing his second wife was the only break in Bradley's time in Bangkok.

One of Bradley's notebooks records his stays in Oberlin, Ohio, and West Haven, Connecticut, between 1847 and 1850. In January 1848, Bradley became associated with the American Missionary Association (AMA) that had just been founded in Albany, New York on 3 September 1846. It was at Oberlin College that he met Sarah Blachly, who became his second wife on 1 November 1848 in Dane, Wisconsin. At the end of October 1849, they set sail for Siam and, after a voyage even more difficult than the first, he was able to resume his calling in Bangkok by the end of May 1850. Sarah Bradley died 16 August 1893, never once having left Thailand. They had the following children: Sarah Adorna Bradley, born 8 April 1850 in Singapore; Dwight Blachly Bradley, 13 October 1852 in Bangkok, died 10 September 1939 in Northboro, Massachusetts; Mary Adele "Dellie" Bradley, born 30 November 1854, married Andrew Trew Blachly 1877, died 6 May 1926 in Takoma Park, Maryland; Irene Belle Bradley, 19 May 1860 in Bangkok, where she died in 1943, unmarried.

The AMA gave Bradley limited resources for mission work, forcing him to focus on making money. Bradley worked as a doctor and also as a merchant to support his mission. Bradley was regarded as an unofficial American consul. He was disappointed at the lack of Christian converts his mission produced. Bradley pointed out many flaws with both the missionaries and the local Thai people. In Bradley's view, the missionaries did not keep the Sabbath strictly enough and requested medical leave far too quickly. Bradley criticized Buddhism and numerous practices that he saw in Thai culture such as drunkenness, slavery, gambling, and polygamy. Bradley, along with many other missionaries, viewed Western culture as superior to that of Thailand. At the time of his death, Bradley's evangelistic work had directly contributed to the conversion of only one person.

== Medical work ==
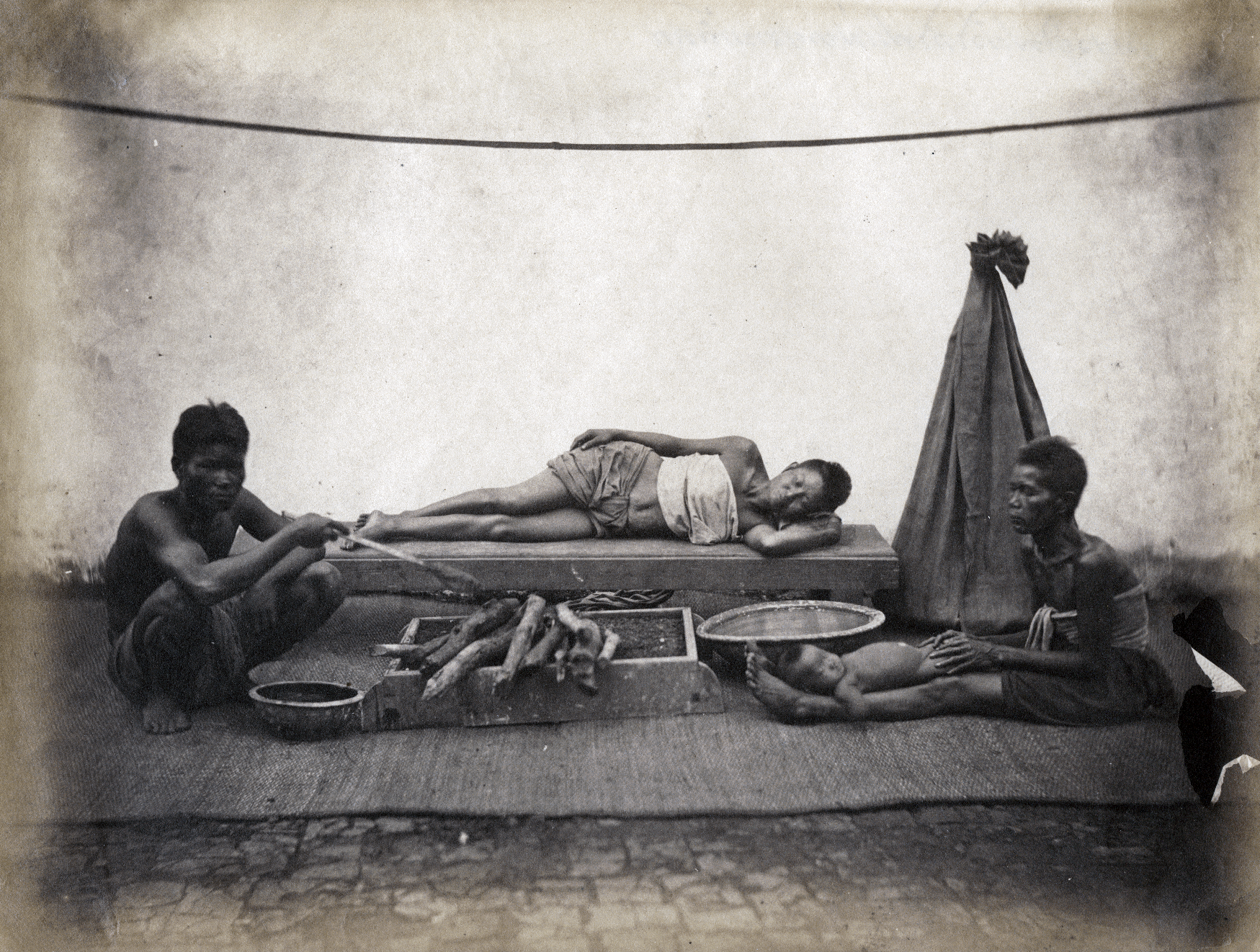
Mother lying by fire

Much of the money made by Bradley during his time in Siam was from performing medical services for the Siamese and missionaries. Bradley was perceived as a "great American doctor" and had immediate credibility among the Siamese. Bradley challenged many of the old medical practices of the country, especially women lying by fire after pregnancy for a month, and wrote multiple books on these topics so that native doctors could learn of Western medical practices.

Bradley is credited with performing the first surgery in Siam, removing a cancerous tumor from the body of a slave. After this surgery, Bradley became highly sought after for medical advice from the royal court. The royal court gained trust in Bradley and called on him for medical advice for years. Bradley taught royal doctors how to perform the same practices as he did and he wrote numerous books for the purposes of the court.

Bradley's greatest medical challenge while in Siam was attempting to produce a vaccination for the smallpox virus, which devastated the country and killed Bradley's eight-month-old daughter, Harriet. Bradley received trial vaccines from Boston, none of which were successful. Bradley solved this problem by using the inoculation technique. (The inoculation technique was documented as having a mortality rate of only one in a thousand. Two years after Dr Peter Kennedy's description appeared, March 1718, Dr. Charles Maitland successfully inoculated the five-year-old son of the British ambassador to the Turkish court under orders from the ambassador's wife Lady Mary Wortley Montagu. Four years later he introduced the practice to England.) Seeing the success that Bradley had with the technique, the royal court called on Bradley to vaccinate their children as well as many natives and slaves.

== Royal ties ==
During his time in Siam, Bradley was almost always associated with the royal family. Prince Chutamani, the younger brother of Prince Mongkut, had urged Bradley to visit the kingdom in order to convince women of the kingdom that the practice of lying by fire after childbirth was harmful to their health. Due to his popularity, Bradley was asked to visit the Queen of Siam. Upon entering the throne room and taking a seat, Chutamani sat on the same level as Bradley, signifying equality.

Shortly after this visit, Prince Chutamani requested the medical services of Bradley to care for the ailing Prince Mongkut. When Bradley's treatment healed Mongkut, a friendship was born between the two. While the medical attention given by Bradley linked him with the royal family for the remainder of his life, it was not until 1835, when Bradley brought a Siamese printing press to Siam from Singapore, that their relationship truly flourished.

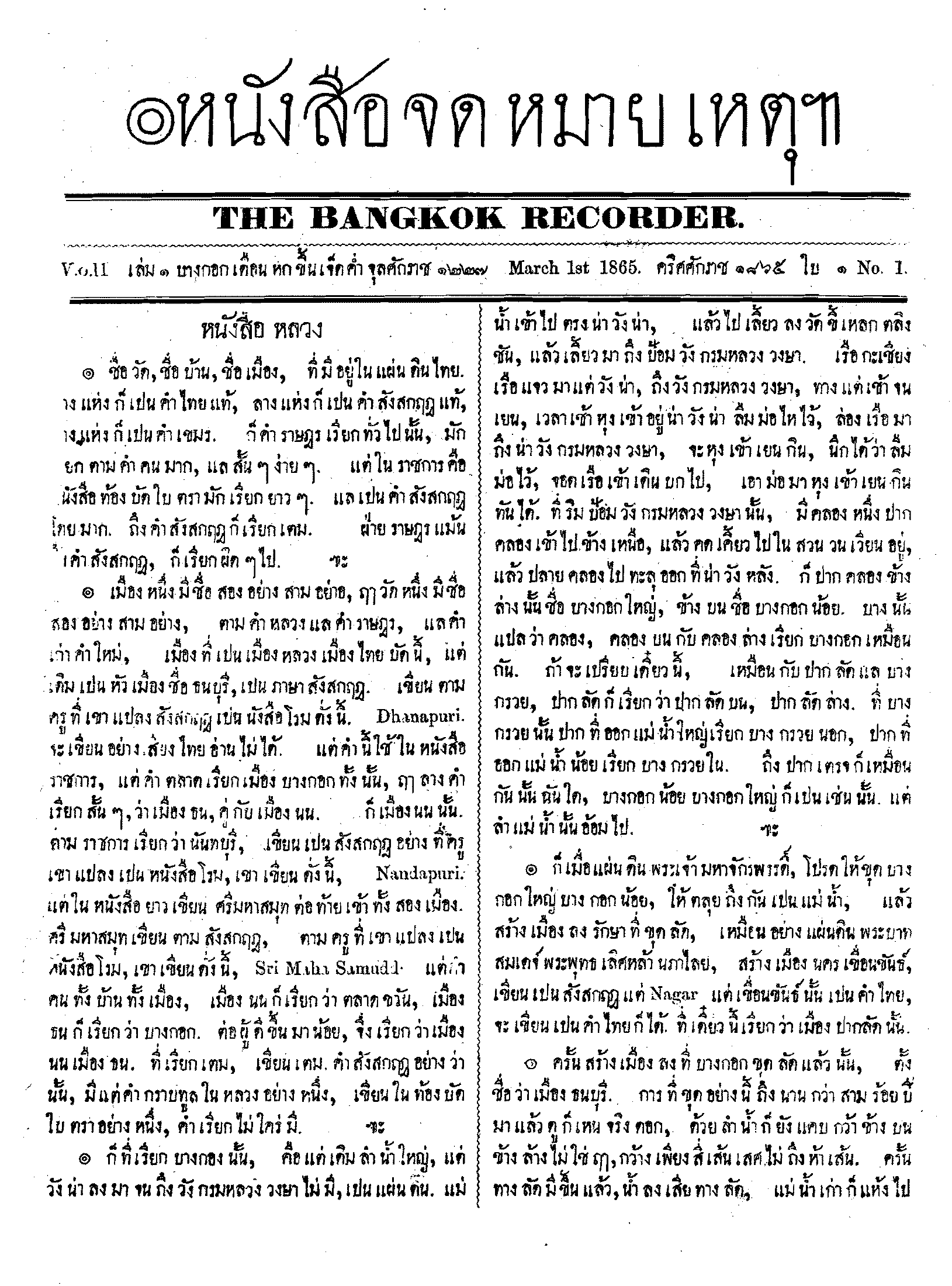

At royal request, Bradley printed the Opium Edict in 1839, which marked the beginning of printing public documents in Siam. Mongkut took a strong interest in the printing press and after he took a visit to London, Bradley and Mongkut made the first copyright transaction in the history of Siam in 1862, a travel journal of Mongkut’s visit. With royal approval, Bradley founded the first newspaper in Siam, The Bangkok Recorder which was published monthly from 1844-1845 and 1865-1867. He also printed the annual almanac, The Bangkok Calendar, from 1859 till his death.

Perhaps one of the most overlooked outcomes from Bradley's relationship with royalty is the change that took place in the educational system. Mongkut valued education highly and Bradley created boarding schools for native children to learn in a Western educational setting. The boarding schools, while unsuccessful, showed the emphasis put on education in Siam during this period. Bradley advised the royal court to pursue education until his death.

As an advocate of education, Bradley had high regard for Anna Leonowens, the teacher of Mongkut's children. Bradley admired the perseverance of Leonowens even though she was not treated with respect from the Siamese. Bradley did admit, however, that Leonowens did not have a significant impact on Siam, an opinion at odds with hers which she recorded in her two volumes of memoirs beginning with The English Governess at the Siamese Court (1870), later fictionalized in Margaret Landon's novel Anna and the King of Siam (1944).

== Other contributions ==
Besides bringing the printing press to Siam, starting the first newspaper, and writing many books, Bradley is credited with translating the Old Testament into Siamese. Bradley was an advocate for Siam's equality and translated French policies into Siamese.

== Death and legacy ==
Bradley died on 23 June 1873. He is remembered in Thailand for introducing vaccination, Western medicine, and the printing press to Thailand, as well as stressing Siamese equality and a better education system. He is buried in the Bangkok Protestant Cemetery.

In 1981, Bangkok Christian Hospital began construction on a new 13-story edifice named in Bradley's honor: Mo (หมอ Dr.) Bradley Building (Thai: อาคารหมอบรัดเลย์). It officially opened on 3 August 1987.

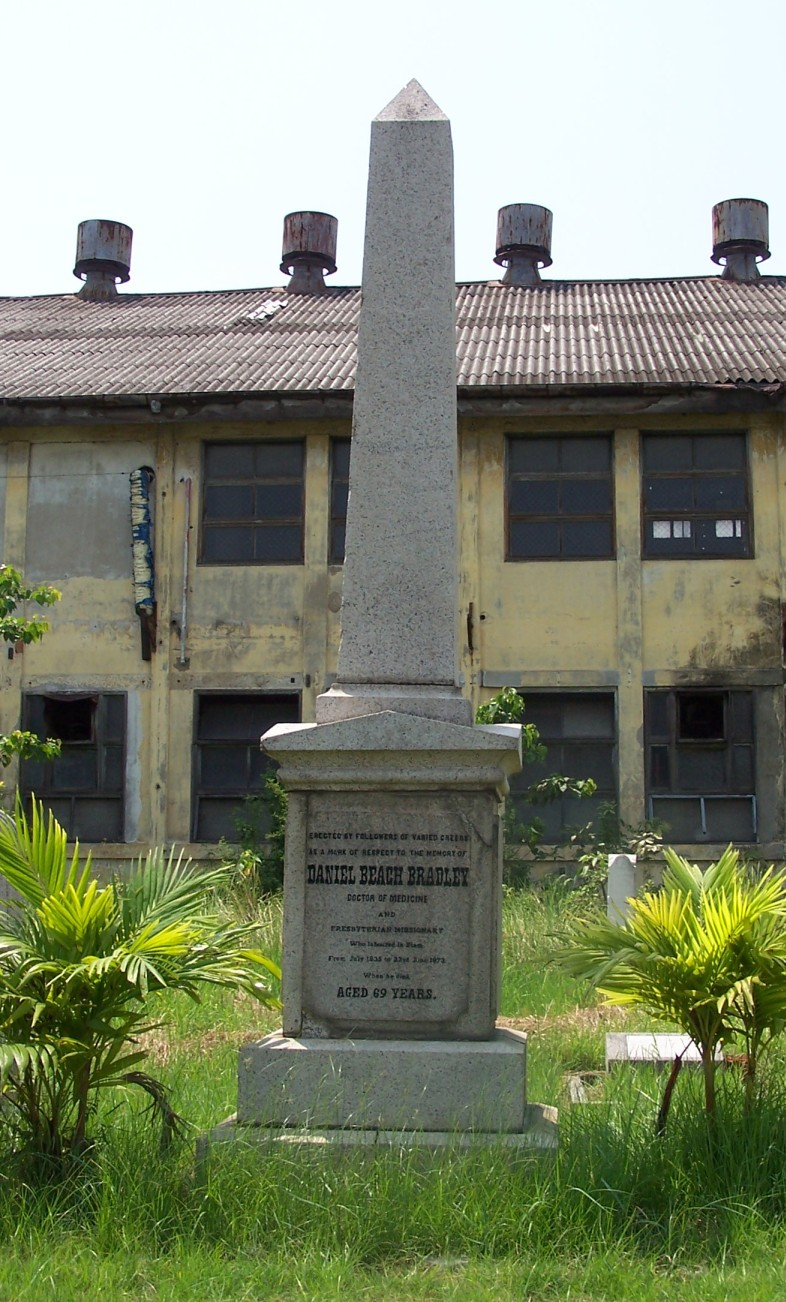
Bradley's grave, Bangkok Protestant Cemetery

== See also ==
- Christianity in Thailand
- John Taylor Jones
- Protestants in Thailand
- Dan Bradley House
