= J. Baird Callicott =

American philosopher (born 1941)

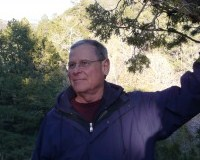
- Callicott in 2010
- Born: 1941 (age 84–85); Memphis, Tennessee, U.S.

Education
- Education: Rhodes College (B.A., 1963); Syracuse University (Ph.D., 1972)
- Thesis: Plato's Aesthetics: An Introduction to the Theory of Forms (1971)

Philosophical work
- Era: 20th-century philosophy
- Region: Western philosophy
- School: Environmental philosophy
- Institutions: University of North Texas
- Main interests: Environmental ethics, Biocomplexity
- Notable ideas: Holistic land ethic

J. Baird Callicott (born 1941) is an American philosopher whose work has been at the forefront of the new field of environmental philosophy and ethics. He is a University Distinguished Research Professor and a member of the Department of Philosophy and Religion Studies and the Institute of Applied Sciences at the University of North Texas. Callicott held the position of Professor of Philosophy and Natural Resources at the University of Wisconsin–Stevens Point from 1969 to 1995, where he taught the world's first course in environmental ethics in 1971. From 1994 to 2000, he served as vice president then president of the International Society for Environmental Ethics. Other distinguished positions include visiting professor of philosophy at Yale University; the University of California, Santa Barbara; the University of Hawaiʻi; and the University of Florida.

Aldo Leopold's A Sand County Almanac is one of environmental philosophy's seminal texts, and Callicott is widely considered to be the leading contemporary exponent of Leopold's land ethic. Callicott's book In Defense of the Land Ethic (1989) explores the intellectual foundations of Leopold's outlook and seeks to provide it with a more complete philosophical treatment; and a following publication titled Beyond the Land Ethic (1999) further extends Leopold's environmental philosophy. Callicott's Earth's Insights (1994) is also considered an important contribution to the budding field of comparative environmental philosophy; a special edition of the journal Worldviews: Environment, Culture, Religion (Volume 1, Number 2) was devoted to scholarly reviews of the work. Callicott is co-Editor-in-Chief with Robert Frodeman of the award-winning, two-volume A-Z Encyclopedia of Environmental Ethics and Philosophy, published by Macmillan in 2009. He is also author of numerous journal articles and book chapters in environmental philosophy and has served as editor or co-editor of many books, textbooks, and reference works in the same field.

== Biography ==
Callicott was born in Memphis, Tennessee on May 9, 1941, to distinguished regional artist and art instructor Burton H. Callicott (1907–2003), of the Memphis Academy of Arts (now Memphis College of Art). In 1959, Callicott graduated from Memphis's then racially segregated Messick High School and attended Southwestern at Memphis (now Rhodes College), earning a B.A. in philosophy with Honors in 1963. He received a Woodrow Wilson Fellowship for graduate study at Syracuse University, completing his M.A. in philosophy (1966) and his doctorate in the same field (1972) after earning a Woodrow Wilson Dissertation Fellowship. His dissertation, titled Plato's Aesthetics: An Introduction to the Theory of Forms, drew from the concentration of his undergraduate and graduate work: ancient Greek philosophy.

Callicott began his career as an academic philosopher in 1966 at Memphis State University (now the University of Memphis). There, as faculty advisor to the Black Students Association, he was active in the Southern Civil Rights Movement during the time of Martin Luther King Jr.’s last campaigns in the area. In 1969, Callicott joined the philosophy department of Wisconsin State University-Stevens Point (now the University of Wisconsin-Stevens Point). As "an expatriate Southerner, fresh from the pitched battles of the Civil Rights struggle in Memphis, Tennessee," Callicott believed that "the environment was under wholesale assault from every direction with no surcease in sight" and that "Civil Rights was a cause already won in the republic of ideas and in the courts (if not on Main Street in Memphis)." He "was a concerned citizen, but [he] was also, more particularly, a challenged philosopher." So Callicott asked "how, as a philosopher, [he] could contribute to a rethinking of human nature and a reconstruction of human values to help bring them into line with the relatively new ideas about the nature of the environment emerging from ecology and the new physics."

For 26 years, Callicott lived and taught in the northern reaches of Wisconsin's sand counties, located on the Wisconsin River, ninety miles from Aldo Leopold's storied shack and John Muir's first homestead on Fountain Lake. Notably, this region was the home to two other influential environmental thinkers. Callicott writes that “the landscape that had helped shape and inspire the nascent evolutionary-ecological thought of the youthful Muir and that of the mature Leopold was the perfect setting for (me) to inaugurate (my) life-long vocation as a founder of academic environmental philosophy.” In 1995, he joined the Department of Philosophy and Religion Studies at the University of North Texas in Denton. The first graduate program in environmental philosophy had been launched at UNT in 1990 under the aegis of Eugene C. Hargrove, then department chair and founding editor of the journal Environmental Ethics. The addition of Callicott to the program gave it a greater reputation in the field.

== Philosophy ==
=== Callicott's environmental ethic ===
"I set out, as a philosopher, to work as a peer to the moral philosophers of the past, to create something new under the philosophical sun — under the gaze of Apollo, as it were — 'a new, an environmental ethic,' such as Richard Routley had warranted in 1973."

In accordance with Leopold's oft-quoted dictum — "A thing is right when it tends to preserve the integrity, stability, and beauty of the biotic community. It is wrong when it tends otherwise" — Callicott espouses a holistic, non-anthropocentric environmental ethic. What he labels the “extensionist” approach to environmental ethics attempts to extend familiar anthropocentric ethical paradigms — legacies of the European Enlightenment — to other-than-human beings. Peter Singer's "animal liberation," for example, extends Jeremy Bentham's utilitarian ethical paradigm to all sentient animals. Paul W. Taylor's "biocentrism" extends the Kantian deontological paradigm to all "teleological centers of life" (i.e. all organisms). Extensionist approaches, however, are inveterately individualistic, conferring “moral considerability” on individual organisms. Actual environmental concerns, however, focus on transorganismic entities: endangered species; threatened biotic communities and ecosystems; rivers and lakes; the ocean and atmosphere. Callicott believes that an adequate environmental ethic — an environmental-ethics paradigm that addresses actual environmental concerns — must be holistic.

Callicott traces the conceptual foundations of the Leopold land ethic first back to Charles Darwin's analysis of the "moral sense" in the Descent of Man and ultimately to David Hume's grounding of ethics in the "moral sentiments" espoused in An Enquiry Concerning the Principles of Morals. Hume argues that moral actions and moral judgments are based on such other-oriented sentiments as sympathy, beneficence, loyalty, and patriotism. Darwin argues that these “moral sentiments” evolved as the sine qua non of social (or communal) solidarity, on which depends the survival and reproductive success of the individual members of society (or community). The tradition of dichotomous thinking in Western philosophy inclines most philosophers to dismiss Hume's ethics as a kind of irrational emotivism, despite the fact that, Callicott believes, Hume clearly provides a key role for reason in moral action and judgment. The faculty of reason, according to Hume, determines (1) relations of ideas, which are essentially logical relationships; and (2) matters of fact. Among such matters of fact, reason both traces the often complex causal chain of the consequences of various actions and discloses the proper objects of the moral sentiments. Accordingly, Leopold also traces both the causal chain of ecological consequences of such seemingly innocent actions as tilling the soil and grazing cattle and discloses a proper object of those moral sentiments — such as loyalty and patriotism — which are excited by social membership and community identity. That proper object of such sentiments is the “biotic community,” revealed by the relatively new science of ecology.

=== Intrinsic value in Nature ===
The distinctiveness of environmental ethics turns on the question of non-anthropocentrism, and that question turns on the question of nature's intrinsic value, according to Callicott. For if nature's only value is its instrumental value to humans, then environmental ethics is just a species of applied ethics, similar to bioethics and business ethics, not a completely new domain of ethical theory or moral philosophy. Callicott offers a subjectivist theory of nature's intrinsic value: he does not challenge the modern classical distinction between subject and object, but rather insists that all value originates in subjects (human or otherwise) and is conferred by those subjects on various objects. In short, Callicott claims, there would be no value without valuers. These objects, however, are valued by subjects in two fundamentally different ways: instrumentally and intrinsically. Tools of various kinds epitomize the kind of objects that subjects value instrumentally; themselves and certain other human beings epitomize the kind of objects that human subjects value intrinsically. Neither kind of valuing is normally done irrationally. A rational person does not typically value a speck of dust instrumentally; nor does a rational person typically value a plastic cup intrinsically. One values various things as tools for various reasons: drills because by their means one can make neat holes; screwdrivers because by their means one can set screws. When a tool is broken or otherwise becomes useless, a rational person ceases to value it instrumentally; and often broken and useless tools are discarded as trash. One also values various things intrinsically for various good reasons.

Philosophers have long provided reasons why human beings should be valued intrinsically (and thus not discarded when broken or useless). Aldo Leopold, according to Callicott, provides reasons why non-human species, biotic communities, and ecosystems should be valued intrinsically (and thus not severely compromised or destroyed). Of wildflowers and songbirds, for example, species with little instrumental value, Leopold writes in Sand County's "The Land Ethic": "Yet these creatures are members of the biotic community, and if (as I believe) its stability depends on its integrity, they are entitled to continuance." And later in “The Land Ethic,” Leopold directly invokes “philosophical value” — that is, what academic environmental philosophers call "intrinsic value": "It is inconceivable to me that an ethical relationship to land can exist without love, respect, and admiration for land, and a high regard for its value. By value, I of course mean something far broader than mere economic value [instrumental value], I mean value in the philosophical sense [intrinsic value]."

=== Comparative environmental philosophy ===
Despite its newness and its departure from familiar ethical paradigms, environmental ethics was, at its inception, using the methods and conceptual resources of the Western philosophical tradition. While that tradition has been enormously influential in shaping Western culture and institutions — especially in the domains of law, politics, and jurisprudence — the Western religious tradition has also been enormously influential in shaping Western culture and institutions. At first, the Western religious tradition was vilified in environmental ethics as the root cause of the environmental crisis. Callicott has explored the possibility of a Judeo-Christian "citizenship" environmental ethic as a more radical alternative to the familiar Judeo-Christian "stewardship" environmental ethic that was developed in response to criticism from environmental historians and philosophers. He has also explored the conceptual resources for environmental ethics in American Indian worldviews and worked with comparative philosophers to explore the conceptual resources for environmental ethics in several Asian philosophical and religious traditions of thought, such as Hinduism, Jainism, Buddhism, Confucianism, and Daoism.

=== Philosophy of conservation and the "received wilderness idea' ===
Callicott has worked with conservation biologists to develop a philosophy of conservation and conservation values and ethics, based in part on the recent paradigm shift in ecology from what he calls the "balance of nature" to the "flux of nature." He has been a strong critic of the "received wilderness idea”: the idea that wildernesses are places that are "untrammeled by man, where man himself is a visitor who does not remain." That idea, Callicott claims in The Great New Wilderness Debate (1998), perpetuates a pre-Darwinian human-nature dualism; in effect, it "erases" from collective memory the indigenous inhabitants of North America and Australia, liberating the current inhabitants of those continents from disturbing thoughts of their own heritage of genocide. Exported to other regions of the world, such as Africa and India, where indigenous peoples still thrive, the wilderness idea has been used to justify their eviction and dispossession in the name of national parks. Callicott instead proposes that, because wilderness areas serve purposes of biological conservation, they should be reconceived more fittingly as "biodiversity reserves."

== Criticisms ==
In response to Callicott's elaboration of the Aldo Leopold land ethic, the land ethic (and, by implication, Callicott's own non-anthropocentric, holistic environmental ethic to the extent that it may differ from Leopold's) has been subject to the charge of "ecofascism," notably leveled by Tom Regan. If members of overpopulous species, such as deer, ought to be "culled" or "harvested," in the name of preserving the integrity, stability, and beauty of the biotic community, and if staggeringly overpopulous Homo sapiens is also but "a plain member and citizen' of the biotic community, then why should culling and harvesting humans be any less obligatory? In “The Conceptual Foundations of the Land Ethic,” Callicott replies that Leopold presented the land ethic as an “accretion” to our evolving complex set of ethics. In other words, the land ethic burdens us with additional moral obligations; it does not substitute for or replace our previously evolved moral obligations, among them the duty to respect the rights of our fellow human beings to life, liberty, and the pursuit of happiness.

This reply led to another criticism: that Callicott provides no "second-order principles" to prioritize duties to fellow humans and those to the biotic community when they conflict. In response, Callicott offered two second-order principles as a framework to adjudicate between conflicting first-order duties: 1) "obligations generated by membership in more venerable and intimate communities take precedence over those generated in more recently emerged and impersonal communities"; 2) "stronger interests take precedence over duties generated by weaker interests." Because our various human community memberships are both more venerable and intimate and because human interests in enjoying rights to life, liberty, and the pursuit of happiness are very strong, Callicott argues that our traditional obligations to individual fellow human beings trump our obligations to preserve the integrity, stability, and beauty of the biotic community — at least, he believes, when it comes to the prospect of culling members of the overpopulous Homo sapiens species.

Additionally, Callicott has been criticized for espousing an overbearing and impolitic monism in environmental ethics. He does not reject pluralism in environmental ethics outright; he only rejects theoretical pluralism, not interpersonal pluralism or normative pluralism. Callicott claims that philosophers and laypersons should not adopt one theory, say utilitarianism, for one purpose or in one context and another theory, say Kantian deontology, for another purpose or in another context (this would be theoretical pluralism). Such theories are mutually contradictory, and he believes that one's moral life should be coherent and self-consistent; however, he also believes that each person should be free to adopt the theory that to them is the most intellectually compelling (interpersonal pluralism). The general theory that Callicott espouses, Humean communitarianism, correlates ethics to community membership. And because each moral agent is subject to as many ethics as his or her community memberships, therefore each person is subject to a plurality of duties and obligations (normative pluralism). In sum, Callicott is a theoretical monist and an interpersonal and normative pluralist.

Callicott's comparative environmental philosophy also involves a tightrope walk between pluralism and monism. In Earth's Insights: A Multicultural Survey of Ecological Ethics from the Mediterranean Basin to the Australian Outback, he seems to embrace pluralism by exploring the conceptual resources for environmental ethics in a wide variety of religious and indigenous worldviews. This work has been criticized, however, for privileging the Leopold land ethic as a norm in reference to which such alternative environmental ethics are evaluated. As Andrew Light observes, Callicott does not insist that the Leopold land ethic is based on the uniquely true worldview of evolutionary biology and ecology. He agrees with multicultural pluralists that the evolutionary-ecological worldview is but one story among many stories. But he does argue that the worldview of evolutionary biology and ecology is more tenable than any other, that the evolutionary-ecological epic is a better story than any other grand narrative.

Callicott's justification for this claim is an analysis based on the following criteria for tenability: self-consistency; comprehensiveness; self-correction; universality; and beauty. The first test of a scientific worldview is logical self-consistency and the evolutionary-ecological worldview passes that test. A tenable scientific worldview must comprehend all known facts and so far the evolutionary-ecological worldview does account for all the facts, such as the existence of the fossil remains of extinct species. When the details of that worldview are shown to be inconsistent with themselves or unable to account for all the facts, the theory is revised accordingly; the evolutionary-ecological worldview is thus self-correcting and is therefore, Callicott believes, becoming ever more refined. The evolutionary-ecological worldview has global currency and enjoys international credibility; that is, it has universal appeal. And finally, as to beauty, Darwin himself observed in the final sentence of the Origin that “There is grandeur in this view of life, with its several powers, having been originally breathed into a few forms or into one; and that, whilst this planet has gone cycling on according to the fixed law of gravity, from so simple a beginning endless forms most beautiful and most wonderful have been, and are being, evolved.”

Most recent criticisms have been leveled at Callicott's works addressing the idea of wilderness, the sanctum sanctorum of the twentieth-century environmental movement. Some scholars acknowledge the intellectual merits of Callicott's critique of the wilderness idea, but regard it as both a betrayal of one of Aldo Leopold's most cherished causes and as giving aid and comfort to the environmental movement's enemies. Callicott counters that his quarrel is with an idea, not the places trammeled by the idea, the preservation of which places he appears to be as ardently supportive as any other environmentalist. In “Should Wilderness Areas Become Biodiversity Reserves,” he argues that the pressing conservation needs of the twenty-first century are better served by the biodiversity-reserve idea. This idea indicates by its very name what the primary goal of wildland preservation is, whereas the wilderness idea is historically associated with outdoor recreation and thus, Callicott claims, confuses the preservation issue and fosters incoherent and contradictory wildlands-use policies.

== Selected publications ==
- Callicott, J. Baird, ed. (1987). Companion to A Sand County Almanac: Interpretive and Critical Essays. Madison: University of Wisconsin Press. ISBN 0-299-11230-6.
- Callicott, J. Baird (1989). In Defense of the Land Ethic: Essays in Environmental Philosophy. Albany: State University of New York Press. ISBN 0-88706-899-5.
- Callicott, J. Baird and Roger T. Ames, eds. (1989). Nature in Asian Traditions of Thought: Essays in Environmental Philosophy. Albany: State University of New York Press. ISBN 0-88706-950-9.
- Flader, Susan L. and J. Baird Callicott (1991). The River of the Mother of God and Other Essays by Aldo Leopold. Madison: University of Wisconsin Press. ISBN 0-299-12760-5.
- Zimmerman, Michael, ed.; J. Baird Callicott, George Sessions, Karen Warren, and John Clark, assoc. eds. (1993). Environmental Philosophy: From Animal Rights to Radical Ecology. Englewood Cliffs, New Jersey: Prentice-Hall. ISBN 0-13-666959-X.
- Callicott, J. Baird (1994). Earth's Insights: A Multicultural Survey of Ecological Ethics from the Mediterranean Basin to Australian Outback. Berkeley: University of California Press. ISBN 0-520-08559-0.
- Callicott, J. Baird and Fernando J. R. da Rocha, eds. (1996). Earth Summit Ethics: Toward a Reconstructive Postmodern Philosophy of Environmental Education. Albany: State University of New York Press. ISBN 0-7914-3053-7.
- Callicott, J. Baird and Michael P. Nelson, eds. (1998). The Great New Wilderness Debate. Athens: University of Georgia Press. ISBN 0-8203-1983-X.
- Zimmerman, Michael, ed.; J. Baird Callicott, George Sessions, Karen Warren, and John Clark, assoc. eds. (1998). Environmental Philosophy: From Animal Rights to Social Ecology, 2nd edition. Englewood Cliffs, New Jersey: Prentice-Hall. ISBN 0-13-778366-3.
- Callicott, J. Baird and Eric T. Freyfogle, eds. (1999). For the Health of the Land: Previously Unpublished Essays and Other Writings on Conservation by Aldo Leopold. Washington: Island Press. ISBN 1-55963-763-3.
- Callicott, J. Baird (1999). Beyond the Land Ethic: More Essays in Environmental Philosophy. Albany: State University of New York Press. ISBN 0-7914-4084-2.
- Zimmerman, Michael, ed.; J. Baird Callicott, George Sessions, Karen Warren, and John Clark, assoc. eds. (2001). Environmental Philosophy: From Animal Rights to Radical Ecology, 3rd edition. Englewood Cliffs, New Jersey: Prentice-Hall. ISBN 0-13-028913-2.
- Callicott, J. Baird and Michael P. Nelson (2004). American Indian Environmental Ethics: An Ojibwa Case Study. Upper Saddle River, NJ: Prentice-Hall. ISBN 0-13-043121-4.
- Zimmerman, Michael, ed.; J. Baird Callicott, Karen Warren, Irene Kaver, and John Clark, assoc. eds. (2005). Environmental Philosophy: From Animal Rights to Social Ecology, 4th edition. Englewood Cliffs, New Jersey: Prentice-Hall. ISBN 0-13-112695-4.
- Callicott, J. Baird and Clare Palmer, eds. (2005). Environmental Philosophy: Critical Concepts in the Environment, Values and Ethics, volume 1. London: Routledge. ISBN 0-415-32647-8 / ISBN 0-415-32646-X (five-volume set).
- Callicott, J. Baird and Clare Palmer, eds. (2005). Environmental Philosophy: Critical Concepts in the Environment, Society and Politics, volume 2. London: Routledge. ISBN 0-415-32648-6 / ISBN 0-415-32646-X (five-volume set).
- Callicott, J. Baird and Clare Palmer, eds. (2005). Environmental Philosophy: Critical Concepts in the Environment, Economics and Policy, volume 3. London: Routledge. ISBN 0-415-32649-4 / ISBN 0-415-32646-X (five-volume set).
- Callicott, J. Baird and Clare Palmer, eds. (2005). Environmental Philosophy: Critical Concepts in the Environment, Issues and Applications, volume 4. London: Routledge. ISBN 0-415-32650-8 / ISBN 0-415-32646-X (five-volume set).
- Callicott, J. Baird and Clare Palmer, eds. (2005). Environmental Philosophy: Critical Concepts in the Environment, History and Culture, volume 5. London: Routledge. ISBN 0-415-34145-0 / ISBN 0-415-32646-X (five-volume set).
- Nelson, Michael P. and J. Baird Callicott, eds. (2008) The Wilderness Debate Rages On: Continuing the Great New Wilderness Debate. Athens: University of Georgia Press. ISBN 0-8203-2740-9.
- Callicott, J. Baird and Robert Frodeman, eds.-in-chief (2009). Encyclopedia of Environmental Ethics and Philosophy, New York: Macmillan. ISBN 978-0-02-866137-7 (set); ISBN 978-0-02-866138-4 (volume 1); ISBN 978-0-02-866139-1 (volume 2); ISBN 978-0-02-866140-7 (ebook).
- Callicott, J. Baird (2009). Genèse (French translation of “Genesis and John Muir” with an Afterword by Catherine Larrère). Marseille: Editions Wildproject L'écologie culturelle/Cultural ecology. ISBN 9782918490029.
- Callicott, J. Baird (2009). 山内、村上監訳『地球の洞察』 2009年, みすず書房、東京 or Chikyu no Dosatsu (Japanese translation of Earth's Insights by T. Yamauchi, Y. Murakami et al.). Tokyo: Misuzu‐shobo. ISBN 978-4-622-08165-4.
- Callicott, J. Baird (2010). Éthique de la Terre. Paris: Éditions Wildproject, Collection Domaine Sauvage. ISBN 978-2-918490-06-7.
- Callicott, J. Baird and James McRae, eds. (2014). Environmental Philosophy in Asian Traditions of Thought. Albany: State University of New York. ISBN 978-1-4384-5201-2.

== See also ==
- American philosophy
- List of American philosophers
- Environmental philosophy
- Environmental ethics
- Aldo Leopold
