= Land steward =

Land steward may refer to:

- Environmental stewardship, responsible use and protection of the natural environment through conservation and sustainable practices
- Land stewardship, caring for a piece of land regardless of its ownership

== See also ==
- Jitō (地頭), medieval land stewards in Japan
