= Land ethic =

Philosophy about how humans should regard land

A land ethic is a philosophy or theoretical framework about how, ethically, humans should regard the land. The term was coined by Aldo Leopold (1887–1948) in his A Sand County Almanac (1949), a classic text of the environmental movement. There he argues that there is a critical need for a "new ethic", an "ethic dealing with human's relation to land and to the animals and plants which grow upon it".

Leopold offers an ecologically based land ethic that rejects strictly human-centered views of the environment and focuses on the preservation of healthy, self-renewing ecosystems. A Sand County Almanac was the first systematic presentation of a holistic or ecocentric approach to the environment. Although Leopold is credited with coining the term "land ethic", there are many philosophical theories that speak to how humans should treat the land. Some of the most prominent land ethics include those rooted in economics, utilitarianism, libertarianism, egalitarianism, and ecology.

== Economics-based land ethic ==
This is a land ethic based wholly upon economic self-interest. Leopold sees two flaws in this type of ethic. First, he argues that most members of an ecosystem have no economic worth. For this reason, such an ethic can ignore or even eliminate these members when they are actually necessary for the health of the biotic community of the land. And second, it tends to relegate conservation necessary for healthy ecosystems to the government and these tasks are too large and dispersed to be adequately addressed by such an institution. This ties directly into the context within which Leopold wrote A Sand County Almanac.

For example, when the US Forest Service was founded by Gifford Pinchot, the prevailing ethos was economic and utilitarian. Leopold argued for an ecological approach, becoming one of the first to popularize this term coined by Henry Chandler Cowles of the University of Chicago during his early 1900s research at the Indiana Dunes. Conservation became the preferred term for the more anthropocentric model of resource management, while the writing of Leopold and his inspiration, John Muir, led to the development of environmentalism.

== Utilitarian-based land ethic ==
Utilitarianism was most prominently defended by British philosophers Jeremy Bentham and John Stuart Mill. Though there are many varieties of utilitarianism, generally it is the view that a morally right action is an action that produces the maximum good for people. Utilitarianism has often been used when deciding how to use land and it is closely connected with an economic-based ethic. For example, it forms the foundation for industrial farming; An increase in yield, which would increase the number of people able to receive goods from farmed land, is judged from this view to be a good action or approach. In fact, a common argument in favor of industrial agriculture is that it is a good practice because it increases the benefits for humans; benefits such as food abundance and a drop in food prices. However, a utilitarian-based land ethic is different from a purely economic one as it could be used to justify the limiting of a person's rights to make a profit. For example, in the case of the farmer planting crops on a slope, if the runoff of soil into the community creek led to the damage of several neighbor's properties, then the good of the individual farmer would be overridden by the damage caused to his neighbors. Thus, while a utilitarian-based land ethic can be used to support economic activity, it can also be used to challenge this activity.

== Libertarian-based land ethic ==
Another philosophical approach often used to guide actions when making (or not making) changes to the land is libertarianism. Roughly, libertarianism is the ethical view that agents own themselves and have particular moral rights, including the right to acquire property. In a looser sense, libertarianism is commonly identified with the belief that each individual person has a right to a maximum amount of freedom or liberty when this freedom does not interfere with other people's freedom. A well-known libertarian theorist is John Hospers. For right-libertarians, property rights are natural rights. Thus, it would be acceptable for the above farmer to plant on a slope as long as this action does not limit the freedom of his or her neighbors.

This view is closely connected to utilitarianism. Libertarians often use utilitarian arguments to support their own arguments. For example, in 1968, Garrett Hardin applied this philosophy to land issues when he argued that the only solution to the "Tragedy of the Commons" was to place soil and water resources into the hands of private citizens. Hardin supplied utilitarian justifications to support his argument. However, it can be argued that this leaves libertarian-based land ethics open to the above critique lodged against economic-based approaches. Even excepting this, the libertarian view has been challenged by the critique that numerous people making self-interested decisions often cause large ecological disasters, such as the Dust Bowl disaster. Even so, libertarianism is a philosophical view commonly held within the United States and, especially, held by U.S. ranchers and farmers.

== Egalitarian-based land ethic ==
Egalitarian-based land ethics are often developed as a response to libertarianism. This is because, while libertarianism ensures the maximum amount of human liberty, it does not require that people help others. It also leads to the uneven distribution of wealth. A well-known egalitarian philosopher is John Rawls. When focusing on land use, egalitarianism evaluates its uneven distribution and the uneven distribution of the fruits of that land. While both a utilitarian- and libertarian-based land ethic could conceivably rationalize this mal-distribution, an egalitarian approach typically favors equality, whether that be an equal entitlement to land or access to food. However, there is also the question of negative rights when holding to an egalitarian-based ethic. In other words, if it is recognized that a person has a right to something, then someone has the responsibility to supply this opportunity or item; whether that be an individual person or the government. Thus, an egalitarian-based land ethic could provide a strong argument for the preservation of soil fertility and water because it links land and water with the right to food, the growth of human populations, and the decline of soil and water resources.

== Ecologically based land ethic ==
Land ethics may also be based upon the principle that the land (and the organisms that live off the land) has intrinsic value. These ethics are, roughly, based on an ecological or systems view. This position was first put forth by Ayers Brinser in Our Use of the Land, published in 1939. Brinser argued that white settlers brought with them "the seeds of a civilization which has grown by consuming the land, that is, a civilization which has used up the land in much the same way that a furnace burns coal.” Later, Aldo Leopold's posthumously published A Sand County Almanac (1949) popularized this idea.

Another example is the deep ecology view, which argues that human communities are built upon a foundation of the surrounding ecosystems or the biotic communities and that all life is of inherent worth. Similar to egalitarian-based land ethics, the above land ethics were also developed as alternatives to utilitarian and libertarian-based approaches. Leopold's ethic is one of the most popular ecological approaches in the early 21st century. Other writers and theorists who hold this view include Wendell Berry (b. 1934), N. Scott Momaday, J. Baird Callicott, Paul B. Thompson, and Barbara Kingsolver.

== Aldo Leopold's land ethic ==
In his classic essay, "The Land Ethic," published posthumously in A Sand County Almanac (1949), Leopold proposes that the next step in the evolution of ethics is the expansion of ethics to include nonhuman members of the biotic community, collectively referred to as "the land." Leopold states the basic principle of his land ethic as: "A thing is right when it tends to preserve the integrity, stability, and beauty of the biotic community. It is wrong when it tends otherwise."

He also describes it in this way: "The land ethic simply enlarges the boundaries of the community to include soils, waters, plants, and animals, or collectively: the land . . . [A] land ethic changes the role of Homo sapiens from conqueror of the land community to plain member and citizen of it. It implies respect for his fellow-members, and also respect for the community as such."

Leopold was a naturalist, not a philosopher. There is much scholarly debate about what exactly Leopold's land ethic asserts and how he argues for it. At its core, the land ethics claims (1) that humans should view themselves as plain members and citizens of biotic communities, not as "conquerors" of the land; (2) that we should extend ethical consideration to ecological wholes ("soils, waters, plants, and animals"), (3) that our primary ethical concern should not be with individual plants or animals, but with the healthy functioning of whole biotic communities, and (4) that the "summary moral maxim" of ecological ethics is that we should seek to preserve the integrity, stability, and beauty of the biotic community. Beyond this, scholars disagree about the extent to which Leopold rejected traditional human-centered approaches to the environment and how literally he intended his basic moral maxim to be applied. They also debate whether Leopold based his land ethic primarily on human-centered interests, as many passages in A Sand County Almanac suggest, or whether he placed significant weight on the intrinsic value of nature. One prominent student of Leopold, J. Baird Callicott, has suggested that Leopold grounded his land ethics on various scientific claims, including a Darwinian view of ethics as rooted in special affections for kith and kin, a Copernican view of humans as plain members of nature and the cosmos, and the finding of modern ecology that ecosystems are complex, interrelated wholes. However, this interpretation has recently been challenged by Roberta Millstein, who has offered evidence that Darwin's influence on Leopold was not related to Darwin's views about moral sentiments, but rather to Darwin's views about interdependence in the struggle for existence.

=== Attractions of Leopold's land ethic ===
Leopold's ecocentric land ethic is popular today with mainstream environmentalists for a number of reasons. Unlike more radical environmental approaches, such as deep ecology or biocentrism, it does not require huge sacrifices of human interests. Leopold does not, for example, believe that humans should stop eating or hunting, or experimenting on animals. Nor does he call for a massive reduction in the human population, or for permitting humans to interfere with nature only to satisfy vital human needs (regardless of economic or other human costs). As an environmental ethic, Leopold's land ethic is a comparatively moderate view that seeks to strike a balance between human interests and a healthy and biotically diverse natural environment. Many of the things mainstream environmentalists favor—preference for native plants and animals over invasive species, hunting or selective culling to control overpopulated species that are damaging to the environment, and a focus on preserving healthy, self-regenerating natural ecosystems both for human benefit and for their own intrinsic value—jibe with Leopold's ecocentric land ethic.

A related understanding has been framed as global land as a commons. In this view biodiversity and terrestrial carbon storage - an element of climate change mitigation - are global public goods. Hence, land should be governed on a global scale as a commons, requiring increased international cooperation on nature preservation.

=== Criticism ===
Some critics fault Leopold for lack of clarity in spelling out exactly what the land ethic is and its specific implications for how humans should think about the environment. It is clear that Leopold did not intend his basic normative principle ("A thing is right when it tends to preserve the integrity, stability, and beauty of the biotic community") to be regarded as an ethical absolute. Thus construed, it would prohibit clearing land to build homes, schools, or farms, and generally require a "hands-off" approach to nature that Leopold plainly did not favor. Presumably, therefore, his maxim should be seen as a general guideline for valuing natural ecosystems and striving to achieve what he terms a sustainable state of "harmony between men and land." But this is vague and, according to some critics, not terribly helpful.

A second common criticism of Leopold is that he fails to state clearly why we should adopt the land ethic. He often cites examples of environmental damage (e.g., soil erosion, pollution, and deforestation) that result from traditional human-centered, "conqueror" attitudes towards nature. But it is unclear why such examples support the land ethic specifically, as opposed to biocentrism or some other nature-friendly environmental ethic. Leopold also frequently appeals to modern ecology, evolutionary theory, and other scientific discoveries to support his land ethic. Some critics have suggested that such appeals may involve an illicit move from facts to values. At a minimum, such critics claim, more should be said about the normative basis of Leopold's land ethic.

Other critics object to Leopold's ecological holism. According to animal rights advocate, Tom Regan, Leopold's land ethic condones sacrificing the good of individual animals to the good of the whole, and is thus a form of "environmental fascism." According to these critics, we rightly reject such holistic approaches in human affairs. Why, they ask, should we adopt them in our treatment of non-human animals?

Finally, some critics have questioned whether Leopold's land ethic might require unacceptable interferences with nature in order to protect current, but transient, ecological balances. If the fundamental environmental imperative is to preserve the integrity and stability of natural ecosystems, wouldn't this require frequent and costly human interventions to prevent naturally occurring changes to natural environments? In nature, the "stability and integrity" of ecosystems are disrupted or destroyed all the time by drought, fire, storms, pests, newly invasive predators, etc. Must humans act to prevent such ecological changes, and if so, at what cost? Why should we place such high value on current ecological balances? Why think it is our role to be nature's steward or policeman? According to these critics, Leopold's stress on preserving existing ecological balances is overly human-centered and fails to treat nature with the respect it deserves.

== See also ==
- Agrarianism
- Biomimicry
- Conservation biology
- Conservation ethic
- Conservation movement
- Deep Ecology
- Ecofeminism
- Ecology
- Ecology movement
- Environmentalism
- Environmental protection
- Environmental stewardship
- Glenn Albrecht
- Habitat conservation
- Land stewardship
- Natural environment
- Natural capital
- Natural resource
- Renewable resource
- Reverence for life
- Solastalgia
- Southern Agrarians
- Sustainability
- Water conservation
