= Shack =

Type of small, often primitive shelter or dwelling

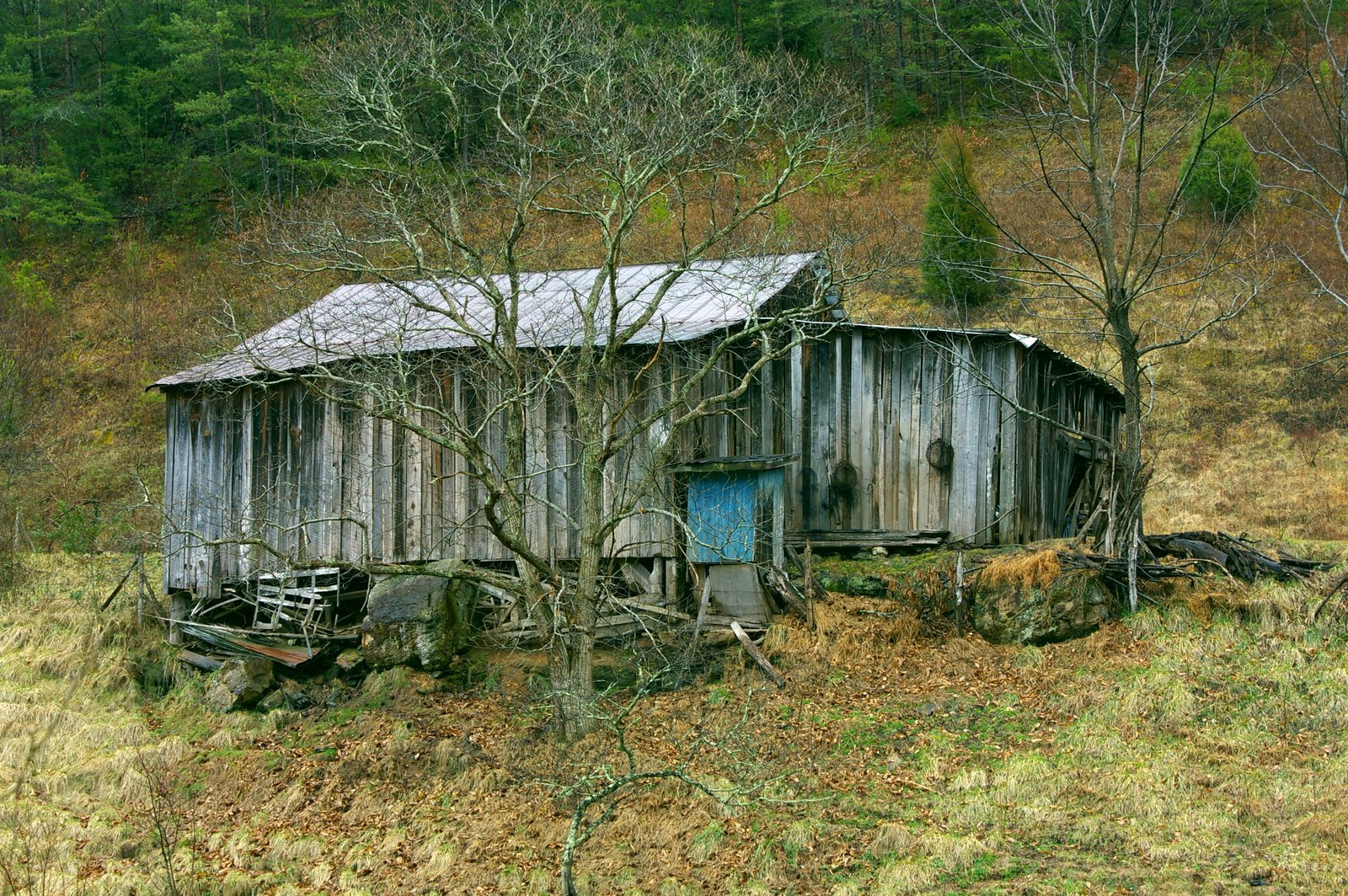
A large shack near Pigeon Forge, Tennessee

A shack (or, in some areas, shanty) is a type of small shelter or dwelling, often primitive or rudimentary in design and construction.

Unlike huts, shacks are constructed by hand using available materials; however, whereas huts are usually rural and made of natural materials (mud, rocks, sticks, etc.) shacks are generally composed of scavenged man-made materials like abandoned construction debris, repurposed consumer waste and other useful discarded objects that can be quickly acquired at little or no cost and fashioned into a small dwelling.

== Background ==
In areas of high population density and high poverty, shacks are often the most prevalent form of housing; it is possible that up to a billion people worldwide live in shacks. Fire is a significant hazard in tight-knit shack settlements. Settlements composed mostly or entirely of shacks are known as slums or shanty towns.

In Australian English, shack can also refer to a small holiday house with limited conveniences, for instance it may not have running water or electricity.

In Canadian oilfield drilling, a shack can also be the word for a wellsite trailer. These structures are notorious among oilfield workers for being cramped, uncomfortable and generally unpleasant to be in.

In the 19th and early 20th centuries, tar paper shacks consisting of wooden frames covered with tar paper were a common form of very low-cost housing in the rural United States and Canada.

== Cultural role in freethought ==
In the frontier history of the United States, freethinkers have often used shacks—small, rundown buildings or structures—as a place to develop new ideas outside the literal confines of the establishment. Professor Michael Lannoo and science writer and editor Eric Engles note the role of shacks in American culture as simple structures that "allow an uncluttered perspective on life's larger questions". Lanoo writes that shacks played a large role in the development of environmental and ecological ideas and philosophy in the United States, allowing people to interact with and investigate nature at a closer level, particularly in the work of Henry David Thoreau, John Muir, Aldo Leopold, and Ed Ricketts. These shacks also served as a meeting place for like-minded people.

== Gallery ==
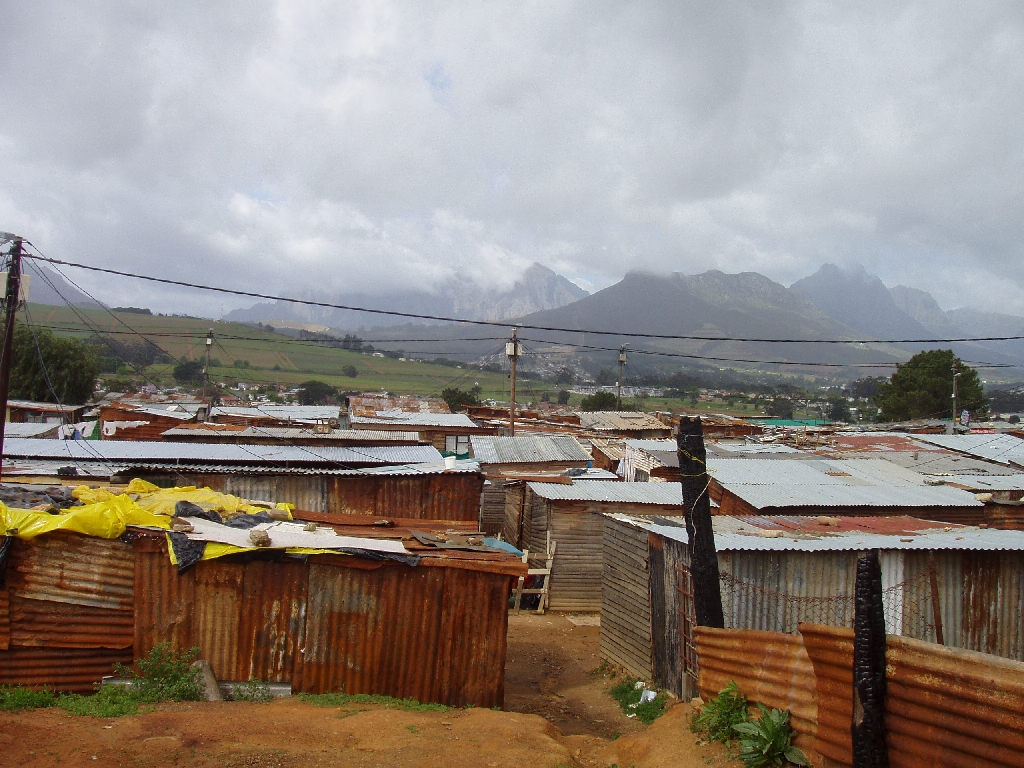
Shacks in Kayamandi, South Africa

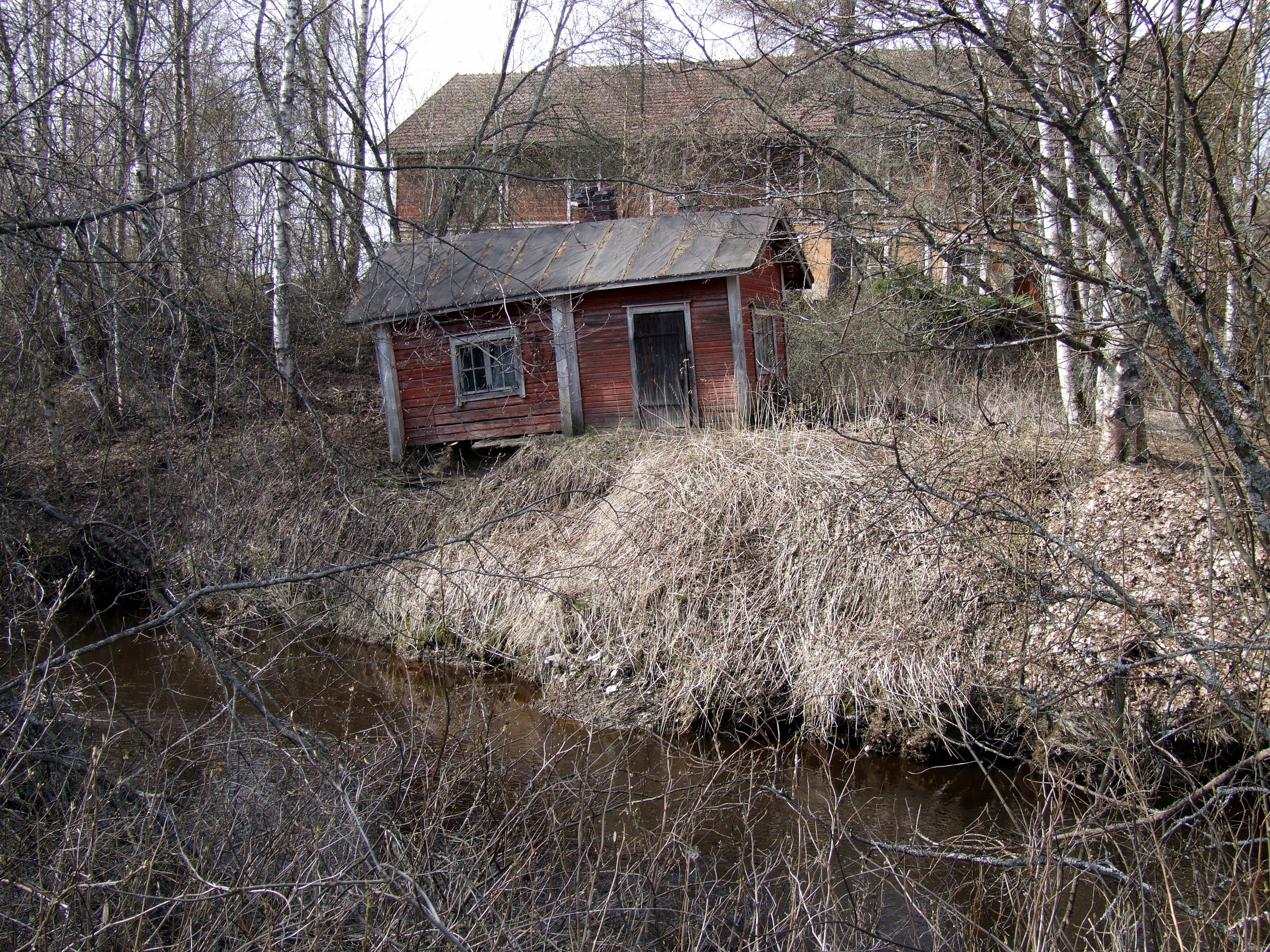
A shack by the Tyrnävä River (Tyrnävänjoki) in Tyrnävä, Finland.

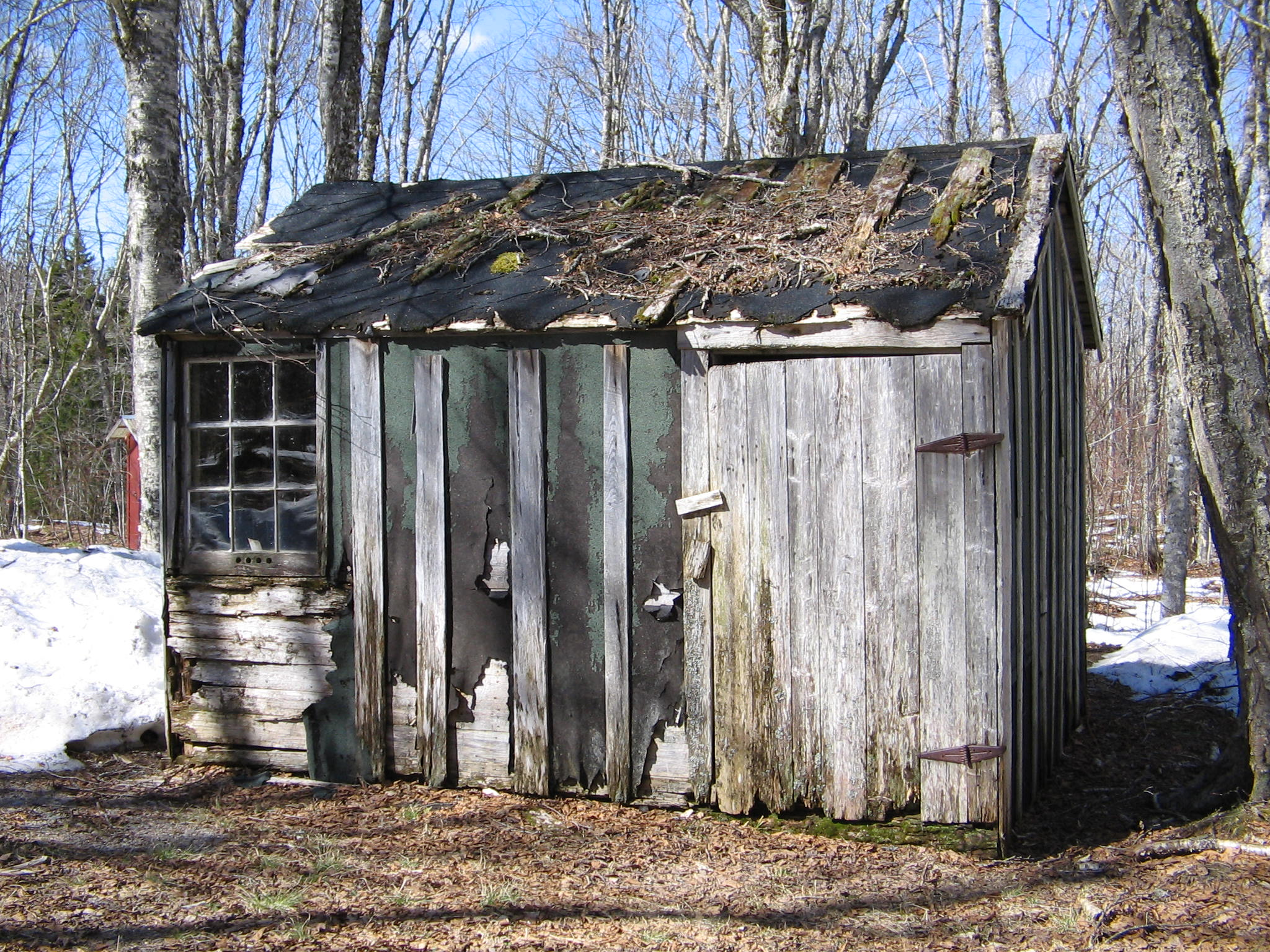
In relatively affluent areas, shacks are often used for storage or have been abandoned.

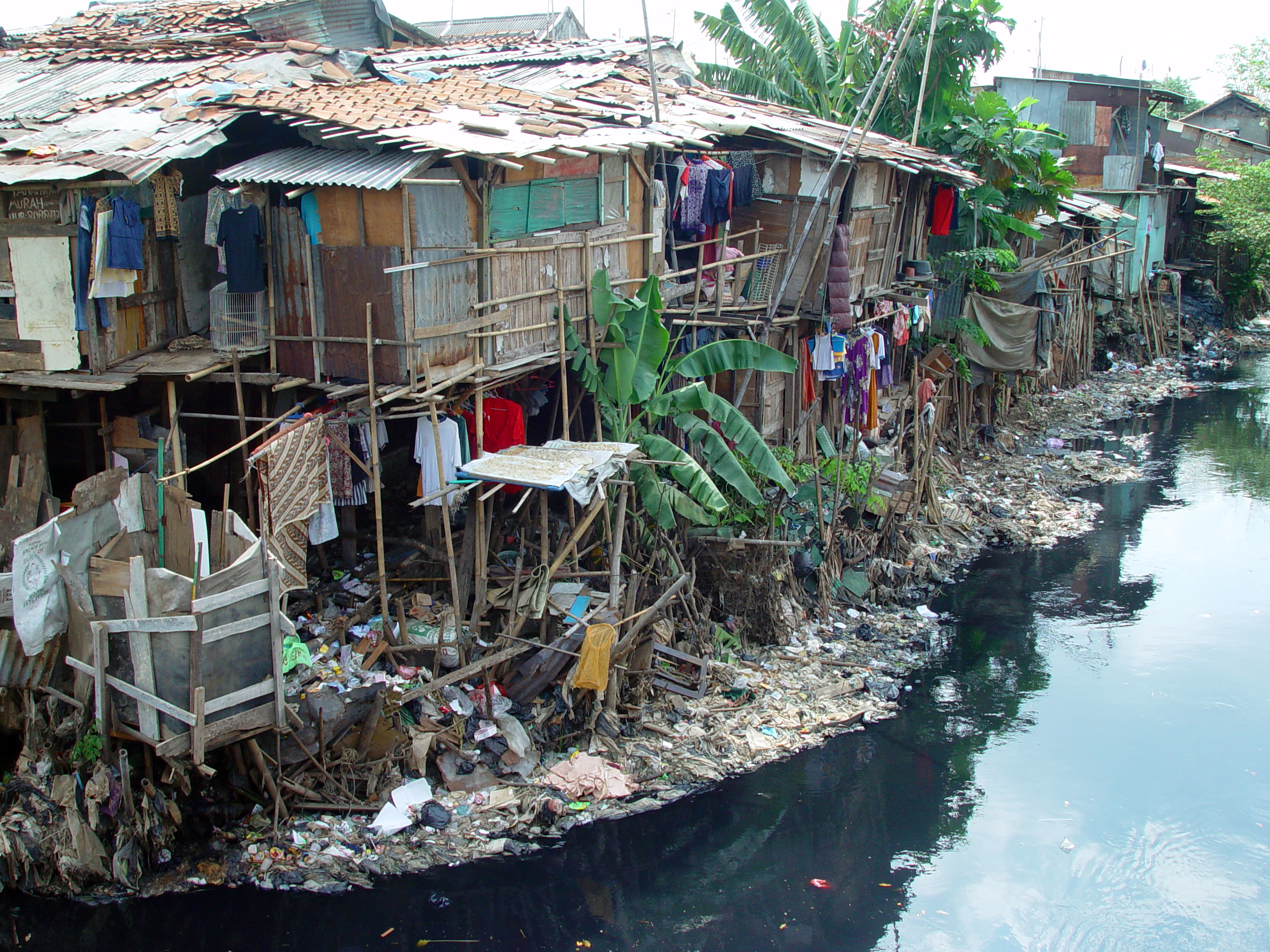
A multi-family shack in a riverside shantytown, Jakarta, Indonesia.

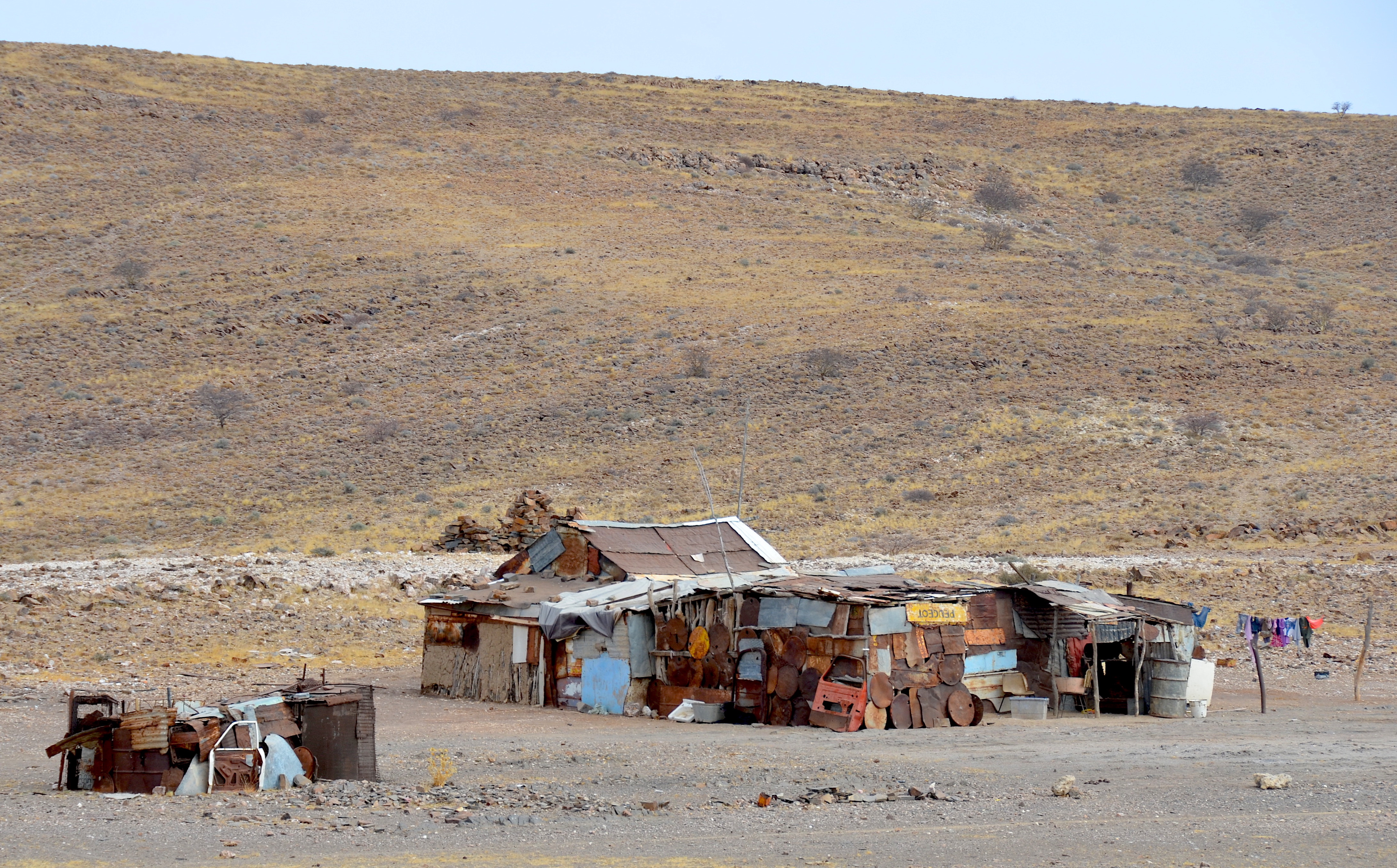
Shacks of Damara people within Namib Desert

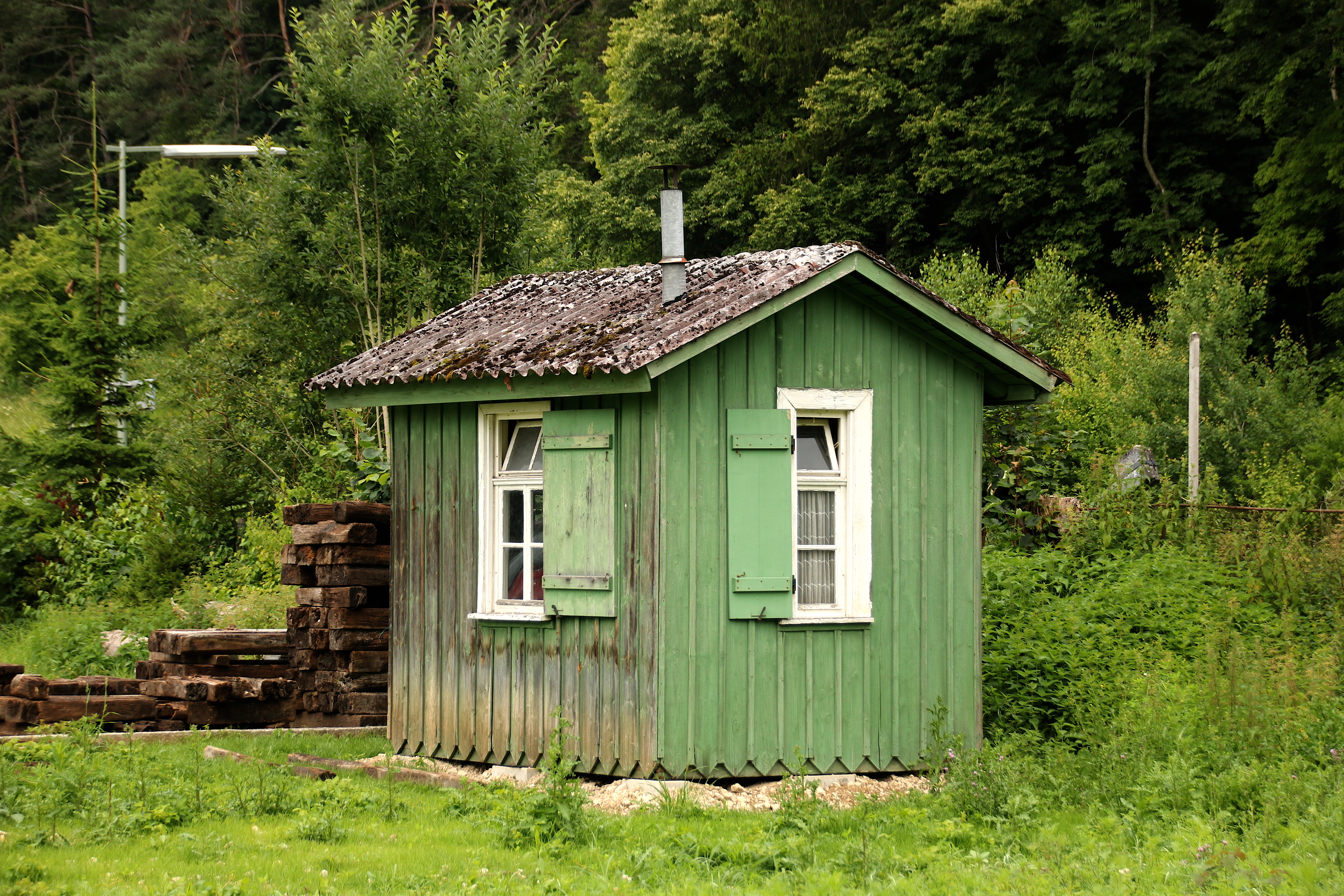
Shack near railway line

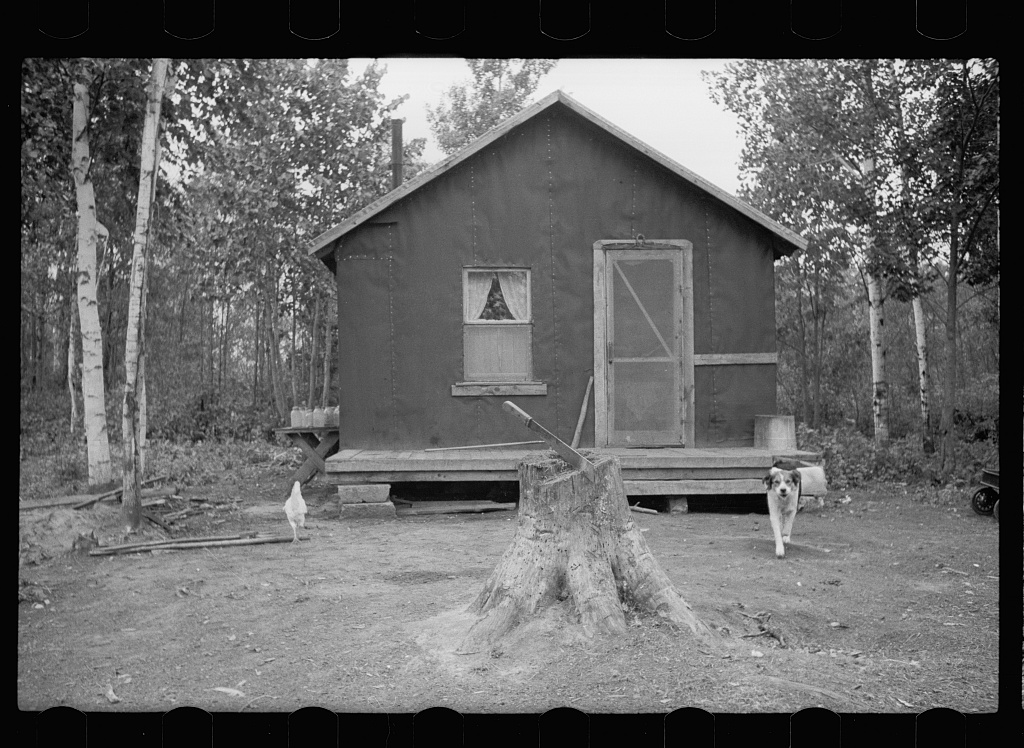
Tar paper shack in the United States, 1930s

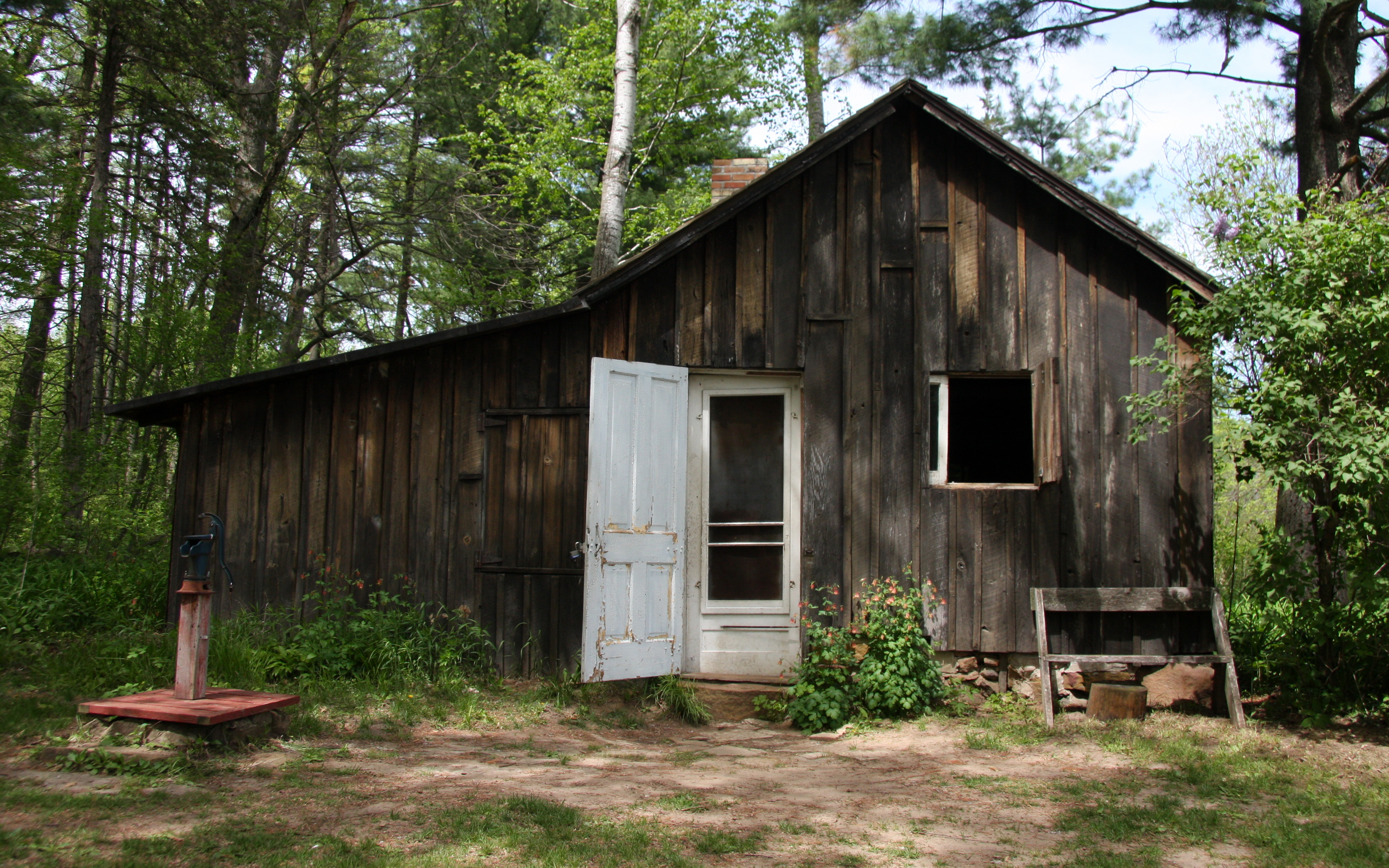
Aldo Leopold's shack

== See also ==
- Radio shack
- Beach hut
- Log cabin
- Log house
- Hunting lodge
- Mountain lodge
- Sweat lodge
- Tipi
