= Temra Costa =

Temra Costa is a regenerative-land stewardship advocate and award-winning author known for her work to advance the viability of sustainable food systems, ecological forestry, and the circular economy. Toward these goals, she develops and implements programs that support local economies, restoration of ecosystems, and preservation of rural working landscapes and communities.

Costa earned her B.S. in International Agriculture and Natural Resource Management from the University of Wisconsin–Madison. She then moved to California in 2003 where she led statewide campaigns to promote local food systems and sustainable agriculture. Her book Farmer Jane: Women Changing the Way We Eat (Gibss Smith, 2010) brought national attention to women's leadership in the food and farming sector.

In 2016, Temra co-founded and developed a land-based project in Sonoma County, CA that advanced her stewardship planning and restoration framework for effecting change. This work led her to form Regenerative Forest Solutions (RFS) in 2022, a nonprofit devoted to research, education and engagement for more resilient landscapes and communities. Since forming RFS, Temra has advanced research and educational projects in carbon sequestration, wood utilization, wildfire resilience, forest restoration, prescribed burning, and land-owner education and engagement. Her work in the field led her to join the Gold Ridge Resource Conservation District as a Director of the Board in 2023.

At the cutting edge of sustainability and circularity, Costa's latest focus is the re-establishment of infrastructure required to support forest restoration and regional resilience. The Hoover Institution of Stanford University selected Costa to serve as a fellow in the Enviropreneur Program in 2026 to develop this concept called Timbershed, a project that supports increased wildfire resilience, forest restoration, and positive public health and economic outcomes.
