= David Orton (deep ecology) =

Canadian ecologist (1934–2011)

David Keith Orton
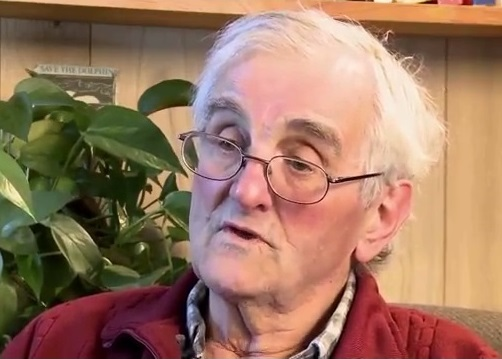
- Orton in 2011
- Born: January 6, 1934; Portsmouth, England
- Died: May 12, 2011 (aged 77); Watervale, Pictou County, Nova Scotia

Philosophical work
- Era: 20th Century
- Region: Western philosophy
- School: Deep ecology, left biocentrism
- Main interests: Environmental ethics

David Keith Orton (January 6, 1934 – May 12, 2011) was a Canadian writer, thinker and environmental activist who played a leading role in developing "left biocentrism" within the philosophy of deep ecology. Orton and his collaborators added the word "left" to biocentrism to indicate their anti-industrial, anti-capitalist orientation and their concern for social justice. Their 10-point Left Biocentrism Primer, published in 1998, accepts the idea that the natural world belongs to all living things, but it also calls for the ethical principles of deep ecology to be applied to sensitive political issues such as working for a reduction in the human population, achieving justice for aboriginal peoples, struggling for workers' rights and redistributing wealth. Orton, however, frequently asserted that the rights of nature had to come first. "Social justice is only possible in a context of ecological justice," he wrote. "We have to move from a shallow, human-centered ecology to a deeper all-species centered ecology." Elsewhere he added: "There is no justice for people on a dead planet."

In his extensive writings for a variety of magazines, journals, websites and his own "Green Web", Orton warned about what he saw as the disastrous effects of basing a society's economy on mass consumption, profit and the exploitation of people and other living beings. "An industrial capitalist society, that does not recognize ecological limits but only perpetual economic expansion and has the profit motive as driver, will eventually consume and destroy itself," he wrote in an online commentary. "But we will all be taken down with it." Orton argued that industrialism, not capitalism, was at the root of ecological destruction. "Industrialism can have a capitalist or a socialist face," he said.

Left biocentrism affirms what one writer calls "a 'collective spirituality' based on the ultimate value of the Earth and its life-forms." Orton himself said that left biocentrism views all living things and the Earth itself as sharing a community. "With such a community," he wrote, "there is a sense of Earth spirituality, as in past animistic indigenous societies, where it acted as a restraint upon human exploitation of nature." Thinkers who influenced Orton and his left-biocentric colleagues included Arne Næss, Richard Sylvan, Rudolph Bahro, and John Livingston.

David Orton practised the voluntary simplicity that is a central tenet of left biocentrism. For 27 years, he lived with his wife and frequent co-author Helga Hoffmann-Orton in a small, 100-year-old farmhouse in Pictou County, Nova Scotia. They grew much of their own food and watched as their 130-acre property gradually reverted to forest habitat for a variety of plants, animals and birds. Orton died of pancreatic cancer in 2011 at age 77. At his own request, he was given a "deep green" burial in the forest near his home.

== Making of an activist ==
=== Early life and education ===
David Orton was born in 1934 in the industrial city of Portsmouth, England. He was one of four boys growing up in a working-class family. In an online autobiography he published six weeks before his death, Orton wrote of his early interest in nature. "In Portsmouth, near where I lived, we had the mudflats of Langston Harbour and not too far away was Farlington Marshes, with its many ducks and geese. Opposite our house was Baffin’s Pond – a large pond with willow trees, swans, ducks, geese, carp and eels."

After failing the exams which "streamed" students to academic or technical programs, Orton ended up at a technical school he disliked because it prepared students for industrial work. Its only redeeming feature for him was its field club which undertook expeditions into the English countryside.

In 1949 at age 15, Orton began a five-year apprenticeship as a shipwright at the Portsmouth Dockyard. His training included building 14-foot sailing dinghies, working on a variety of naval vessels and a stint in the drawing office. Although he graduated 10th out of 44 shipwright apprentices and worked for an additional year in the dockyard, Orton writes that he never felt competent in the trade. In the meantime, he studied evenings at the Portsmouth College of Technology, searching, in his words, for a "'way out' of the industrial life."

To his apparent surprise, Orton passed "Ordinary Level English" in 1954--"most unusual for someone with my educational background at that time." He attributes this unexpected success to his reading of authors such as D. H. Lawrence and his interest in poetry. The qualifications he had earned at the Portsmouth College of Technology gained him admission to the then, Newcastle upon Tyne campus of Durham University in 1955–56 where he studied for a Bachelor of Science degree in naval architecture. However, he found scientific study uninteresting and failed in all subjects in the examinations of June 1956. He did manage to pass chemistry on a second try in September, but once again, failed mathematics and physics. His studies at Durham were over.

=== Military service ===
During the 1950s, young men who were medically fit were required to serve for two years in the British military. However, those who qualified could earn extra pay and choose their assignments if they signed up for an extra year. Orton writes that he "stupidly" signed on for a three-year stint with the Royal Army Educational Corps. The army considered him qualified to instruct other conscripts based on his education. But after 269 days, the army decided he did not have the skills to succeed as an instructor. Orton writes that he failed because he lacked the necessary education, but also disliked army discipline and the way military lessons were conducted. The commanding officer's letter of reference, however, paints a picture of a serious and responsible young man:

He is intelligent and has a sound academic background. Although quiet and reserved he has sound principles and convictions. His appearance is neat and his manner good. He can be trusted to apply himself well at all times.

Orton was told after his release from the educational corps, he would be recalled to complete his two years of military service. "As I did not want this, I knew it meant leaving the country," he writes.

=== Emigration to Canada ===
At age 23, David Orton sailed for Canada arriving in Montreal in November 1957. His skills as a shipwright qualified him for permanent residency in Canada as a landed immigrant. (He became a Canadian citizen on January 7, 1963.) Orton worked as a railway clerk and brewery tank cleaner until he enrolled, in 1959, as a Bachelor of Arts student at Montreal's Sir George Williams University, now known as Concordia. In the meantime, he met and began living with Gunilla Larsson, a woman who worked at the Swedish consulate in Montreal.

Orton received his B.A. degree in 1963 along with a congratulatory letter from the university's vice-principal. It said that although Orton had not won the medal awarded to the highest-ranking B.A. student, "you came very close to it, and your achievement is so fine that I felt that I ought to write to you and congratulate you upon the fine work that you have done here as a student, and to tell you how proud we are of you."

=== Graduate studies ===
In the fall of 1963, Orton, age 29, moved to New York City to attend the New School for Social Research, now known as The New School. He studied in the Graduate Faculty of Political and Social Science earning his Master of Arts degree in 1965 and winning a prize as "outstanding student in sociology". He then passed the qualifying examination for Ph.D studies and, in 1966, passed the Ph.D oral exam, but did not submit the required thesis. In the meantime, he taught at the then, New York City Community College and served as a teaching assistant to sociology professor, Carl Mayer.

Gunilla Larsson joined Orton in New York and they were eventually married. Their son Karl (named after Karl Marx) was born in New York. A daughter, named Johanna, was born later in Montreal.

=== Politics and teaching ===
During his studies in New York, David Orton became engaged in the political struggles that would continue for the rest of his life. He writes that he was influenced by the movement against the Vietnam War and left-wing politics in general. Off campus, he worked in the offices of Science & Society, which describes itself as "the longest continuously published journal of Marxist scholarship, in any language, in the world." On campus, Orton joined other students in demanding that their professors give them more of a say in the content of the courses they were being taught. "It was an uphill battle," Orton writes.

After graduate school, Orton returned to Montreal where he taught as a lecturer in sociology at Sir George Williams from 1967 to 1969. At first, the university seemed eager to hire a "local boy" who had done well academically. But Orton's brand of socialism and his immersion in the hippie culture of New York's Greenwich Village did not endear him to his colleagues in the sociology department. "I had a beard," he writes "and hippy beads around my neck, with the casual clothes to match."

Differences in outlook soon led to a series of clashes. Orton advocated blending socialist theory and practice, but those he termed "academic Marxists," wanted him to stop trying to organize and learn German so that he could read Marx in his original language. Orton's proposed reading lists for his classes and his tentative ideas for allowing students to influence course content led to a full meeting of the department where he was rebuked for not sharing "the consensus of the discipline of sociology." His involvement with the "Movement for Socialist Liberation" displeased university officials especially when the group actively opposed the on-campus recruitment of students by war-related industries.

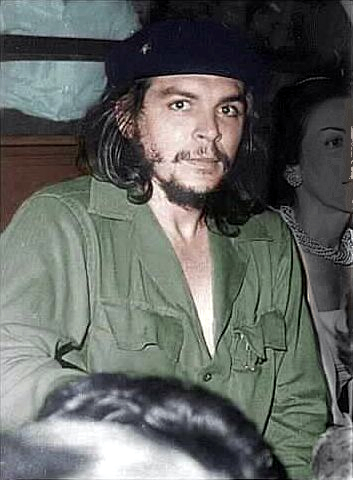
Che Guevara in 1959. David Orton admired Guevara's practise of revolutionary principles.

After the death of the revolutionary communist Che Guevara in 1967, Orton wrote an article for the student newspaper that he says, landed him in considerable trouble:

Che Guevara was no coffee-house revolutionary. He could not be classified as an academic Marxist. Many of these gentlemen—who may be spotted on university campuses in America and Canada, well salaried, well fed and well clothed—make absolute distinctions between revolutionary theory and revolutionary action...Che had an interest in revolutionary theory but he also believed in praxis. His message was brutally simple, yet profound: The revolution will be made by those who act, not by those who endlessly talk and contribute to left-wing journals, regarding strategy, tactics, objective versus subjective conditions, etc, etc.

In 1969, the university did not renew his teaching contract partly because Orton had not completed his PhD thesis, but also, he writes, because of general hostility toward him from other faculty members. For example, English professor David Sheps wrote an article for the magazine Canadian Dimension that attacked Orton's scholarly credentials:

He is a self-proclaimed Marxist Leninist who, as far as anyone can tell, has read practically no Marx or Lenin. Since he also refuses on principle to read 'bourgeois sociology' (which he seems to interpret broadly enough to include most left-wing sociologists), many have wondered if he has read anything at all. The Sociology department had chosen not to renew his contract, a decision every left-wing faculty member regarded as eminently sensible.

Orton writes that the article "helped to create the material conditions such that I would never again obtain a full-time teaching position in Canada."

=== Communist organizing ===
Sometime during his academic career at Sir George Williams, David Orton became active in the Internationalists, originally a Maoist student group that declared itself a political party in 1970 under the banner of the Communist Party of Canada (Marxist-Leninist). Both Orton and his wife Gunilla served on the party's central committee and Orton himself became vice-chairman. He ran as a Marxist-Leninist political candidate in Montreal in two federal elections.

Orton's party organizing work in Montreal, Regina and Toronto led to clashes with the law. After he helped organize a protest against a visiting American military band in Regina, Orton was arrested, but charges against him were eventually dropped. In 1972, however, he chose to spend 40 days in a Toronto jail rather than pay a $400 fine after participating in a demonstration against a meeting of a white supremacist group called the Western Guard.

Although he didn't know it at the time, the Royal Canadian Mounted Police sought evidence so they could charge Orton with sedition over incidents that occurred in November 1969 during a seminar at the Regina campus of the University of Saskatchewan. The 1978 book, An Unauthorized History of the RCMP by Lorne and Caroline Brown, reports that during a panel discussion on "Revolt vs. the Status Quo", Orton stated the Marxist-Leninist position that armed revolution was the only way to change the political system. The book adds that during a later session, Orton denounced Harry Magdoff, a visiting American Marxist as a liberal reformist and attempted unsuccessfully to take over the microphone. Fifteen months later after the invocation of Canada's War Measures Act, the Mounties tried to gather evidence against Orton, but the university authorities refused to release a tape recording of the panel discussion or co-operate in any other way.

Orton and Gunilla resigned from the Marxist-Leninists in 1975 because they felt the party organization was undemocratic.

=== Refocus on environment ===
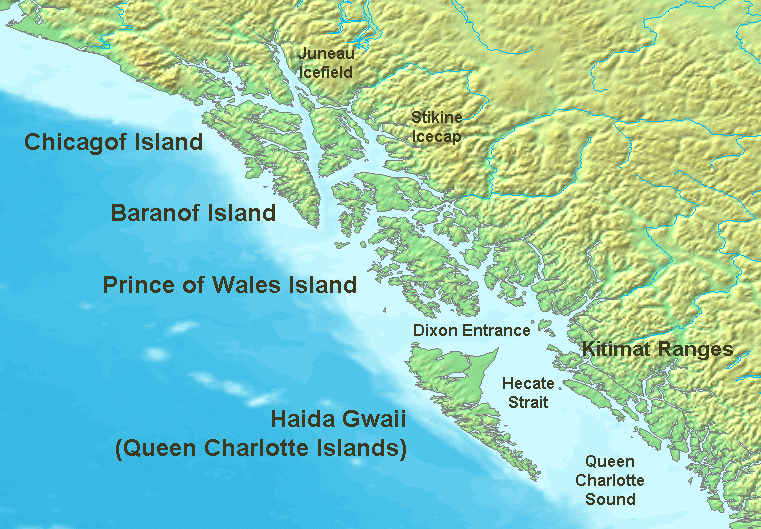
Map showing Queen Charlotte Islands

After a couple of years working as a shipwright carpenter on the Montreal waterfront, Orton moved with his family in 1977 to the Queen Charlotte Islands or Haida Gwaii, "Islands of the People," off the northern coast of British Columbia. The move proved to be a turning point in the evolution of Orton's ideas. A job with a fish-packing outfit brought him into contact with the fishing community. He also became interested in the Haida people's environmental ideas as they pursued their land claims. "I decided to refocus my organizing work on environmental issues and not social justice politics," Orton writes in his autobiography.

Orton made contact with the B.C. Federation of Naturalists and eventually wrote a 30-page report for them on a controversial issue—a proposal that would eventually lead to protected, national park reserve status for part of South Moresby Island. The report, entitled "The Case against the Southern Moresby Wilderness Proposal," pointed to a number of contradictions in the naturalists' position. In a book outline written in 2005, Orton suggests that during his time in B.C. he started to understand the inherent conservatism of naturalists' organizations and "the limiting assumptions of mainstream environmentalism." He also realized that the logging industry promoted the management of forests primarily for the production of timber and he saw the fallacies of "multiple use" or "integrated resource management." Orton felt these approaches devalued wilderness as a set of resources to be exploited for the benefit of human beings. He later called it "resourcism" or "the world view that the non-human world exists as raw material for the human purpose."

Orton writes that he and Gunilla Larsson decided to separate shortly after arriving in the Queen Charlotte Islands. "It was a difficult, although friendly, parting," he adds. "(She eventually took our children, Karl and Johanna, back to Sweden.)" Orton decided to move in with Helga Hoffmann, a woman he knew from his days as a Marxist-Leninist. Hoffmann, whom he would later marry, lived in Victoria, B.C.

Helga brought a two-person kayak up to the Charlottes and we took it into the Southern Moresby Wilderness Proposal area. We mainly lived off edible plants and the fish we caught from the kayak. It was a pretty unplanned trip, with no life jackets or signalling gear, just a compass and a map. This forced us to confront and adjust to some extreme weather, plus the natural rhythms of the oceans. I believe this trip was important in developing my environmental consciousness.

In the fall of 1977, Orton moved to Victoria to live with Helga. While there, he joined the local naturalists club and worked on a number of environmental issues including the defence of the Tsitika Watershed on northern Vancouver Island. Orton went to meetings where he clashed with loggers and logging company representatives in his attempts to defend the watershed's ecological integrity. He also wrote a long article about the issue for the B.C. Federation of Naturalists newsletter. "I had come to really oppose the land tenure system, exploited by the logging companies in British Columbia, who used their forest land 'crown leases' to demand millions of dollars in compensation when a park or protected area was proposed," he writes. Orton also sent letters to local newspapers on wildlife and forestry issues and he became a regional vice-president of the Federation. "I found the naturalists generally quite conservative on environmental issues," he writes. "They liked observing nature, but did not want to fight in its defence."

== Path to left biocentrism ==
We believe the worldwide industrial capitalist system is destroying the Earth. This system, with its human-centered view of nature as a "resource" and its roots in endless economic growth and consumerism, has us all on a death path.

– From The Green Web–An Introduction by David Orton.

In September 1979, Orton, then 45, moved with Helga Hoffmann-Orton to Nova Scotia. By the mid-1980s, they were living with their one-year-old daughter, Karen, on a 130-acre farm in Pictou County. By then, Orton had also become acquainted with the philosophy of deep ecology and had begun formulating ideas that would eventually lead him to "left biocentrism" which he defines as "an evolving theoretical tendency within the deep ecology movement." In 1988, he established his website, the Green Web. "By researching and publishing bulletins through the Green Web," he notes, "I eventually began writing from a left biocentric perspective." He took part in an Internet discussion group called "left bio." The group adopted the deep ecology recognition of the inherent value of all living things but supplemented it with a left biocentric concern for social justice.

Orton also contributed to Canadian Dimension, a left-wing, anti-corporate magazine. Some of his articles explored what Orton himself acknowledged was an extremely sensitive topic—relations between environmental groups and aboriginal peoples. While he contended that environmentalists needed to form alliances with aboriginal peoples, he also warned against what he saw as an uncritical endorsement of aboriginal positions that violated biocentric or Earth-first principles. He pointed, for example, to aboriginal support for the fur industry and commercial trapping as well as for the killing of wolves in the Yukon to save a caribou herd. Orton criticized the portrayal of native peoples as having lived in complete harmony with nature before the coming of Europeans. He argued that aboriginal groups had hunted several large animals to extinction including mammoths, mastodons and giant bison. "In Canada, a class-based industrial capitalist society imprints its value system upon Native communities as well as upon the non-Native environmental movement," he wrote. "It is not helpful to present a romanticized view of the past as the contemporary Indigenous reality."

During his years in Nova Scotia, Orton took part in many environmental campaigns against what he saw as destructive practices. He vigorously opposed forest clearcutting and spraying; the slaughter of seals; the widespread use of all-terrain vehicles; uranium mining and the installation of industrial wind turbines.

=== Deep ecology ===
Judging by his writings, Orton seems to have been attracted to deep ecology partly because of its anti-industrial, anti-capitalist orientation and its belief that industrialism is to blame for the ecological crisis threatening the Earth. For Orton, the realization that major environmental problems cannot be resolved within an industrial system, distinguishes deep ecology from "shallow ecology."

The soul of deep ecology is the belief that there has to be a fundamental change in consciousness for humans, in how they relate to the natural world. This requires a change from a human-centered to an ecocentric perspective, meaning humans as a species have no superior status in Nature. All other species have a right to exist, irrespective of their usefulness to the human species or human societies. Humans cannot presume dominance over all non-human species, and see Nature as a "resource" for human and corporate utilization.

Orton's experiences waging environmental campaigns in Nova Scotia may also have led him to adopt the central principles of deep ecology. The province's economy is heavily dependent on the extraction of natural resources, and it relies heavily on industrial forestry.

In his article, My Path to Left Biocentrism: Part II-Actual Issues, Orton writes about living 30 kilometres from a big pulp mill and smelling its hydrogen sulphide emissions when the wind blew in his direction. He could also hear the noises from big forestry machines clearcutting huge areas, many of which were sprayed with biocides:

These clearcuts have also meant extensive wildlife habitat destruction, blowdowns in adjacent woodlots, increased human recreational access, and a significant lowering of water levels in the river, the West River, which runs through the valley. Very large areas around here have absolutely no forest canopy remaining. This environmental vandalism, a direct consequence of the softwood, pulp mill forestry orientation in Nova Scotia, has intensified throughout the province. This is the on-ground reality, no matter the increasing use of "eco-rhetoric" by the companies and their government regulatory partners, e.g. proposed "model forests" or "integrated resource management" of crown lands; no matter the increasing awareness of deep ecology by some environmentalists; or the forestry critiques which have come from a number of people, including myself.

Orton writes that it is these concrete examples of forest and wildlife destruction that form the basis for "mobilizing activists to fight pulp mill forestry and to fight biological and chemical herbicide spraying programs." He adds that the term "pulp mill forestry" encompasses pulp mills themselves as well as industrial practices such as forest spraying and clearcutting. "The issues are interdependent and need to be fought together."

=== Left biocentrism ===
David Orton argued that mainstream deep ecology seems to believe in what he called the "educational fallacy," namely, that ideas are enough to effect fundamental change in the human relationship to the natural world. For him, this approach fails to come to terms with the issues of class and power in industrial, capitalist society. He notes that, at first, he used the term "socialist biocentrism" to signal the importance of fighting for social justice as part of the struggle against the destruction of Nature. However, he abandoned the label partly because he felt it excluded non-socialists and partly because it glossed over what he saw as the anti-ecological characteristics of socialism itself. For Orton, other positions, such as Eco-Feminism and Eco-Marxism, put human concerns ahead of the needs of the natural world. "Ecology must be primary," he wrote, and if it is, one can be involved in peace/anti-war and social justice issues. Left biocentrism says that you must be involved in social justice issues as an environmental activist, but ecology is primary."

The new social order, which will respect the rights of all species and their specific habitats, will be based on spirituality and morality, not the economy.

– From My Path to Left Biocentrism by David Orton.

In 1998, after lengthy discussion among "left bio" adherents, Orton compiled the Left Biocentrism Primer, a 10-point guide outlining the basic tenets of their "left focus" within the deep ecology movement. Among other things, the primer says "left biocentrism believes that deep ecology must be applied to actual environmental issues and struggles, no matter how socially sensitive." It mentions the need for reducing the human population and considering "aboriginal issues" and "workers' struggles" in the context of a philosophy that puts the needs of the natural world ahead of human-centred concerns.

Although Orton saw the eight-point deep ecology platform as the basis for unity, he criticized the movement's ambiguity when it came to taking positions against economic development. He noted, for example, that Arne Næss, one of the movement's founders, had promoted the concept of sustainable development while arguing against the economic philosophy of zero growth.

Orton criticized mainstream environmental organizations such as the Canadian Environmental Network for accepting government money and working with industrial interests. He saw the network as inhibiting "the emergence of a grass-roots controlled and funded, more radical environmental movement in Canada." He also criticized green parties for adopting "shallow" ecological positions in their pursuit of electoral success.

In calling for a radical reduction in the impact of industrialism on the natural world, Orton wrote that life can only be protected by mobilizing the species that is destroying it. "Paying attention to social justice and questions of class, corporate power, and entrenched self-interest, is a necessary part of that human mobilization, and the movement to a deep ecology world," he wrote. "The new social order, which will respect the rights of all species and their specific habitats, will be based on spirituality and morality, not the economy."

=== Immigration reduction ===
Orton repudiates the left-wing accusations of the population issue, saying, “Deep ecology supporters, contrary to some social ecology slanders, seek population reduction, or perhaps controls on immigration from a maintenance of biodiversity perspective, and this has nothing to do with fascists.
