= Charles W. Schwartz =

Charles W. Schwartz (June 2, 1914 – July 4, 1991) was an American wildlife artist, biologist, author, conservationist, and filmmaker known for his work on Missouri wildlife.

== Early life and education ==
Schwartz was born in St. Louis to parents Frederick O. Schwartz and Clara Walsh Schwartz. He received his AB in Zoology from the University of Missouri in 1938. A graduate assistantship during his MA led Schwartz to work with Elizabeth Reeder, a Ph.D. candidate. They married in 1938 and later had three children. In 1940, Schwartz completed his MA and began work at the Missouri Conservation Commission as a biologist.

== Career ==
Schwartz's career with the Missouri Department of Conservation lasted for thirty-nine years. A short stint from 1946 to 1947 was spent in Hawaii studying wildlife conditions for Hawaii's Board of Agriculture and Forestry. Throughout the late twentieth century, the Schwartzes wrote and illustrated books, created films, and made artwork on wildlife and conservation topics. In 1949, Game Birds of Hawaii was published and selected by the Wildlife Society as the best publication in wildlife management and ecology for 1949–1950. Several other films won awards, including a 1952 CONI Grand Medal for Bobwhite through the Year and the American Association for Conservation Information best North American wildlife movie award in 1959 for Story of the Mourning Dove.

In 1949, Schwartz illustrated Aldo Leopold's landmark book on conservation, A Sand County Almanac: And Sketches Here and There.

Another Schwartz collaboration, The Wild Mammals of Missouri, was co-published by the University of Missouri Press and the Missouri Department of Conservation. Containing over four hundred illustrations and information about sixty-six species, Wild Mammals proved to be one of their most important works. The American Association for Conservation Information selected it as the outstanding wildlife book in 1959 and revised editions were published in 1981 and 2001.

Schwartz's artwork was used for Missouri trout and duck stamps, conservation fundraising for the Conservation Federation of Missouri and other efforts, and books by other Missouri wildlife writers. From 1965 to 1987, he completed murals for the Missouri Department of Conservation headquarters in Jefferson City.

Schwartz retired in 1981. He remained active as an artist and outdoorsman. He died from pancreatic cancer at his home in Coeur d'Alene. A posthumous book, About Mammals and How They Live, was completed by Libby, published in 1993, and selected by the Wildlife Society for its 1994 Conservation Education Award.
