= Paul W. Taylor =

American philosopher

- Born: November 19, 1923
- Died: October 14, 2015 (aged 91)
- Occupation: Philosopher

Paul W. Taylor (November 19, 1923 – October 14, 2015) was an American philosopher best known for his work in the field of environmental ethics.

== Biography ==
Taylor's theory of biocentric egalitarianism, related to but not identical with deep ecology, was expounded in his 1986 book Respect for Nature: A Theory of Environmental Ethics, and has been taught in university courses on environmental ethics. Taylor taught philosophy for four decades at Brooklyn College, City University of New York and was professor emeritus there at the time of his death.

== Respect for Nature ==
Taylor's Respect for Nature is widely considered one of the fullest and most sophisticated defences of a life-centered (biocentric) approach to nature. In this work, Taylor agrees with biocentrists that all living things, both plants and animals, have inherent value and deserve moral concern and consideration. More radically, he denies human superiority and argues that all living things have equal inherent value. Recognizing that human interests inevitably conflict with the interests of plants and animals, Taylor carefully lays out and defends a variety of priority principles for the fair resolution of such conflicts.

Taylor's new theory of environmentalism based on the "biocentric outlook" was used in opposition to speciesism. His theory advocated four beliefs: that humans are equal members of the earth's community of life, that humans and members of other species are interdependent, that "all organisms are teleological centres of life in the sense that each is a unique individual pursuing its own good in its own way" and that "humans are not inherently superior to other living things."

Taylor's biocentric outlook emphasizes "species impartiality" and because of this it is said to provide the justification for the respect for nature including the recognition that wild animals and plants have "inherent worth" and thus deserve moral respect, so they should not "be harmed or interfered with in nature, other things being equal".

Taylor argued that humans should behave towards nonhuman organisms by four guided rules: the rule of nonmaleficence, the rule of non-interference, the rule of fidelity and the rule of restitutive justice. The four rules prohibit humans from harming any living entity in the natural environment without good reason. Taylor admitted that none of the four rules are absolute and offered "priority principles" for handling conflicts. For example his principle of self-defense allows humans to protect themselves against life-threatening organisms by destroying them and his principle of minimum wrong permits humans to further their nonbasic interests over the basic interests of animals and plants only under the condition of minimizing wrongs done to nonhumans. His principle of restitutive justice requires that animals and plants receive a form of compensation for any harm done to them.

Taylor was a critic of animal rights and he held the view that only humans have moral rights. He argued that animals and plants cannot have rights because they lack certain capacities for exercising them. Despite this, his biocentric outlook asserted that humans are not superior to wild animals or plants and they all have inherent worth.

A 25th anniversary edition of the book was published in 2011 with a new foreword by Dale Jamieson.

== Reception ==
Kristin Shrader-Frechette wrote that Taylor broke new grounds in environmental ethics with his concepts of biocentric outlook and inherent worth and suggested that he developed "the most philosophically sophisticated theory of environmental ethics that has yet appeared". However, she noted various flaws with his theory.

Shrader-Frechette said that a problem with Taylor's biocentric outlook is giving "inherent worth" to all animals, humans and plants that requires compensation for every control or intrusion affecting their lives. She commented that "if everyone has duties of compensation to virtually every other living entity, as indeed we must in Taylor's scheme, then applying Taylor's ethics is complex, cumbersome and unworkable. We would each have hundreds of conflicting duties of compensation alone". Shrader-Frechette also noted a problem of incoherence in Taylor's claim that only humans have moral rights because he also argued that the interests of humans and nonhumans "must equally be taken into consideration" and that humans are not superior but this is incoherent because he held the view that human interests are protected by rights but nonhuman interests are not.

Philosopher Louis G. Lombardi also noted Taylor's odd position on rights considering he denied human superiority over animals and plants but restricted moral rights to humans.

== Selected publications ==
- Normative Discourse (Prentice-Hall, 1961; Greenwood Press, 1973, 1976)
- Principles of Ethics: An Introduction (Dickenson, 1975; Wadsworth, 1980)
- In Defense of Biocentrism (Environmental Ethics, 1983)
- Are Humans Superior to Animals and Plants? (Environmental Ethics, 1984)
- Respect for Nature: A Theory of Environmental Ethics (Princeton University Press, 1986)
- Inherent Value and Moral Rights (The Monist, 1987)

== See also ==
- American philosophy
- List of American philosophers
