= Reverence for Life =

Concept in Albert Schweitzer's ethical philosophy

The phrase Reverence for Life (German: Ehrfurcht vor dem Leben) came to Albert Schweitzer on a boat trip on the Ogooué River in French Equatorial Africa (now Gabon), while searching for a universal concept of ethics for modern times. In the German book with the same title its editor, Hans Walter Bähr, used the explanatory expression 'solidarity with life'.

In Civilization and Ethics, Schweitzer wrote:

Ethics is nothing other than Reverence for Life. Reverence for Life affords me my fundamental principle of morality, namely, that good consists in maintaining, assisting and enhancing life, and to destroy, to harm or to hinder life is evil.

James Brabazon, author of Albert Schweitzer: A Biography, defined Reverence for Life as follows:

Reverence for Life says that the only thing we are really sure of is that we live and want to go on living. This is something that we share with everything else that lives, from elephants to blades of grass—and, of course, every human being. So we are brothers and sisters to all living things, and owe to all of them the same care and respect, that we wish for ourselves.

Schweitzer made Reverence for Life the basic tenet of an ethical philosophy, which he developed and put into practice. He gave expression to its development in numerous books and publications during his life and also in manuscripts which have recently been published; the main work being his unfinished four-part Philosophy of Culture (German: Kulturphilosophie) subtitled: "The World-view of Reverence for Life". He also used his hospital in Lambaréné, Gabon, to demonstrate this philosophy in practice.

== Origins ==
Albert Schweitzer believed that ethical values which could underpin the ideal of true civilization had to have their foundation in deep thought and be world- and life-affirming. He therefore embarked on a search for ethical values in the various major religions and world-views accessible to him, but could not find any that were able, unequivocally, to combine ethics with life-affirmation. It was not until two years after moving out to Gabon to establish the Albert Schweitzer Hospital that he finally found the simple statement which answered his quest.

In his autobiography Out of My Life and Thought, Schweitzer explains this process: "Having described how at the beginning of the summer of 1915 he awoke from some kind of mental daze, asking himself why he was only criticizing civilization and not working on something constructive." He relates how he asked himself the question:

But what is civilization?

The essential element in civilization is the ethical perfecting of the individual as well as society. At the same time, every spiritual and every material step forward has significance for civilization. The will to civilization is, then, the universal will to progress that is conscious of the ethical as the highest value. In spite of the great importance we attach to the achievements of science and human prowess, it is obvious that only a humanity that is striving for ethical ends can benefit in full measure from material progress and can overcome the dangers that accompany it. The present situation was terrible proof of the misjudgment of the generation that had adopted a belief in an immanent power of progress realizing itself, naturally and automatically, and which thought that it no longer needed any ethical ideals but could advance toward its goals by means of knowledge and work alone.

The only possible way out of chaos is for us to adopt a concept of the world based on the ideal of true civilization.

But what is the nature of that concept of the world in which the will to the general progress and the will to the ethical progress join and are linked?

It consists in an ethical affirmation of the world and of life.

What is affirmation of the world and of life?....

In that mental state, I had to take a long journey up the river ... Lost in thought, I sat on deck of the barge, struggling to find the elementary and universal concept of the ethical that I had not discovered in any philosophy. I covered sheet after sheet with disconnected sentences merely to concentrate on the problem. Two days passed. Late on the third day, at the very moment when, at sunset, we were making our way through a herd of hippopotamuses, there flashed upon my mind, unforeseen and unsought, the phrase: "Reverence for Life". The iron door had yielded. The path in the thicket had become visible. Now I had found my way to the principle in which affirmation of the world and ethics are joined together!"

According to some authors, Schweitzer's thought, and specifically his development of Reverence for Life, was influenced by Indian religious thought and in particular Jain principle of ahimsa (non-violence). Albert Schweitzer has noted the contribution of Indian influence in his book Indian Thought and Its Development:

The laying down of the commandment to not kill and to not damage is one of the greatest events in the spiritual history of mankind. Starting from its principle, founded on world and life denial, of abstention from action, ancient Indian thought – and this is a period when in other respects ethics have not progressed very far – reaches the tremendous discovery that ethics know no bounds. So far as we know, this is for the first time clearly expressed by Jainism.

It should not be overlooked, however, that as a child Schweitzer felt deeply for the suffering of all the creatures around him. He wrote, "As far back as I can remember I was saddened by the amount of misery I saw in the world around me. Youth's unqualified joie de vivre I never really knew...One thing especially saddened me was that the unfortunate animals had to suffer so much pain and misery....It was quite incomprehensible to me – this was before I began going to school – why in my evening prayers I should pray for human beings only. So when my mother had prayed with me and had kissed me good-night, I used to add silently a prayer that I composed myself for all living creatures. It ran thus: "O heavenly Father, protect and bless all things that have breath guard them from all evil, and let them sleep in peace...."

Schweitzer twice went fishing with some boys "because they asked [him] to" and "this sports was soon made impossible for me by the treatment of the worms that were put on the hook...and the wrenching of the mouths of the fishes that were caught. I gave it up...From experiences like these, which moved my heart....there slowly grew up in me an unshakeable conviction that we have no right to inflict suffering and death on another living creature, and that we ought all of us to feel what a horrible thing it is to cause suffering and death..."

This awareness affected him throughout his life, as when he would carefully, gently scoop a spider out of a hole it had fallen into before planting a crop there, to feed his patients and their families who also worked on the hospital farm. He wrote that, just as our own existence is significant to each of us, "[a creature's] existence is significant to it." He wrote that "...my relation to my own being and to the objective world is determined by reverence for life. This reverence for life is given as an element of my will-to-live..." and this will-to-live existed in all creatures and was to be respected.

In his book The Philosophy of Civilization, Schweitzer wrote, "Ethics are responsibility without limit toward all that lives....Love means more, since it includes fellowship in suffering, in joy, and in effort...

== The will to live ==
Schweitzer held the view in the 1920s that people had largely lost touch with their own will, having subjugated it to outside authority and sacrificed it to external circumstances. He therefore pointed back to that elemental part of ourselves that can be in touch with our will and can exercise it for the good of all.

In Out of My Life and Thought, Schweitzer wrote:

The most immediate fact of man's consciousness is the assertion "I am life that wills to live in the midst of life that wills to live"

Affirmation of life is the spiritual act by which man ceases to live thoughtlessly and begins to devote himself to his life with reverence in order to give it true value. To affirm life is to deepen, to make more inward, and to exalt the will to live.

At the same time the man who has become a thinking being feels a compulsion to give to every will to live the same reverence for life that he gives to his own.[...] This is the absolute, fundamental principle of ethics, and is a fundamental postulate of thought.

In his search for an answer to the problems posed by what was to him the obvious decline of western civilization, Albert Schweitzer was not prepared to give up the belief in progress which is so much taken for granted by Europeans. Rather, he sought to identify why this 'will to progress' was seemingly going off the rails and causing the disintegration of European civilization.

He came to the following conclusion in Out of my Life and Thought:

By itself, the affirmation of life can only produce a partial and imperfect civilization. Only if it turns inward and becomes ethical can the will to progress attain the ability to distinguish the valuable from the worthless. We must therefore strive for a civilization that is not based on the accretion of science and power alone, but which cares most of all for the spiritual and ethical development of the individual and of humankind. Standing, as all living beings are, before this dilemma of the will to live, a person is constantly forced to preserve his own life and life in general only at the cost of other life. If he has been touched by the ethic of reverence for life, he injures and destroys life only under a necessity he cannot avoid, and never from thoughtlessness.

== See also ==
- Animal ethics
- Ahimsa
- Ahimsa in Jainism
- Compassion
- Consistent life ethic
- Land ethic
- Right to life
- Struggle for existence
