= Aldo Leopold Shack and Farm =

Historic house in Wisconsin, United States

- U.S. National Register of Historic Places
- U.S. National Historic Landmark District
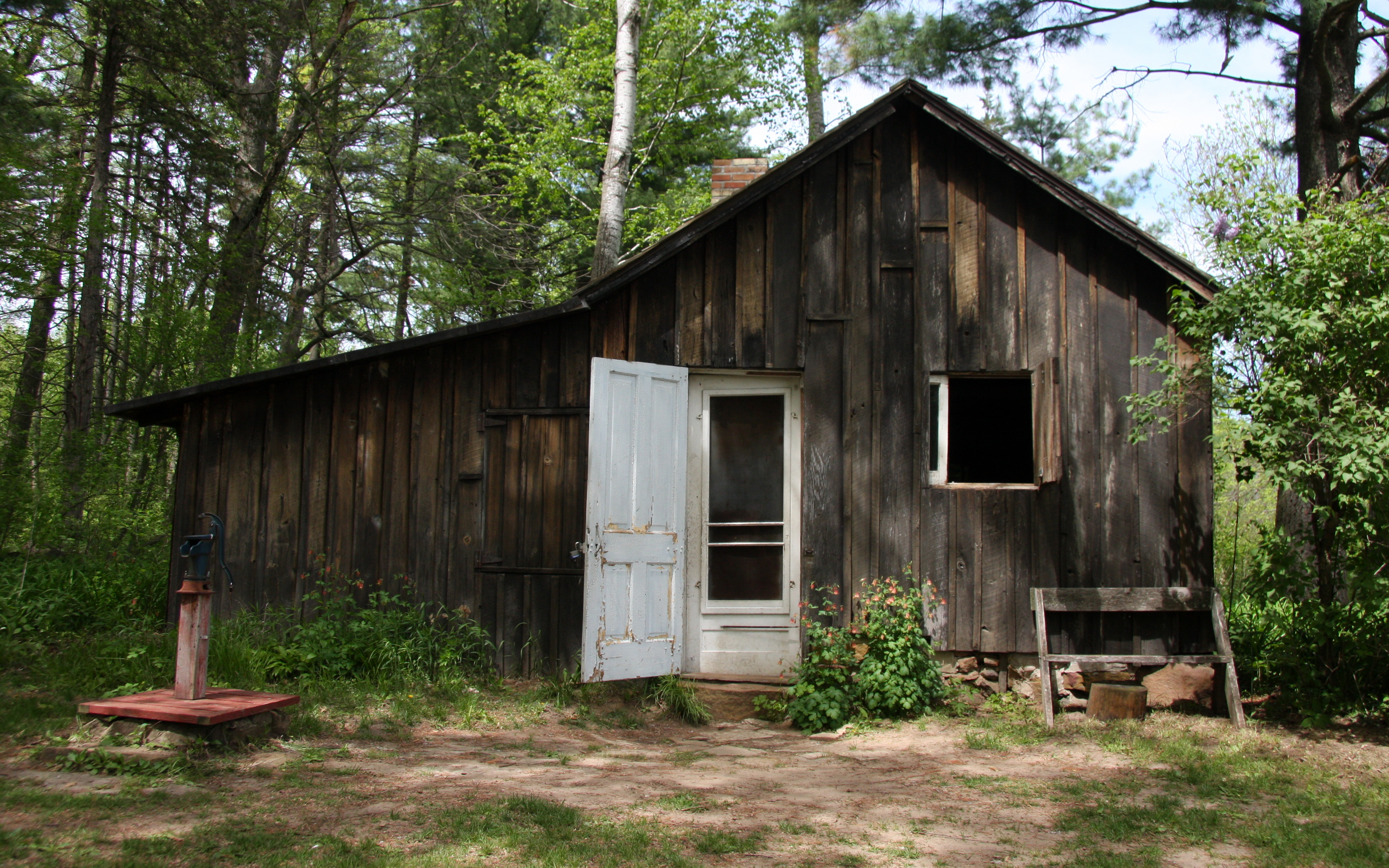
- Aldo Leopold Shack in 2014

- Location within Wisconsin Location within the United States
- Nearest city: Lewiston, Wisconsin
- Coordinates: 43°33′46″N 89°39′33″W
- Area: 264 acres (107 ha)
- Built: 1935
- NRHP reference No.: 78000082

Significant dates
- Added to NRHP: July 14, 1978
- Designated NHLD: January 16, 2009

The Aldo Leopold Shack and Farm is a historic farm on Levee Road in rural Sauk County, Wisconsin, United States. The property was acquired in the 1930s as a family summer retreat by the noted conservationist and writer Aldo Leopold and is the landscape that inspired his conservation ethic and the writing of his best-known work, A Sand County Almanac. The property is now owned and managed by the Aldo Leopold Foundation, which provides tours and other educational programs on the property and the adjacent visitors center. It was listed on the National Register of Historic Places in 1978 and was designated a National Historic Landmark in 2009.

== History and description ==
Leopold began buying land here in 1935, acquiring more than 150 acres (61 ha) by the time of his death in 1948. The family continued to acquire land until 1970, including a small island in the river. The family then donated the property to the Aldo Leopold Foundation. The property is about 264 acres (107 ha) on the south bank of the Wisconsin River northeast of Baraboo, Wisconsin. The property is roughly rectangular in shape, extending south from the river, and roughly bisected by Levee Road. The foundation has a visitors' center about 0.5 miles (0.80 km) east of the property at the junction of Levee and Schemp Roads. The farm is biologically diverse, with floodplain forest and marshland and former fields that have been restored to native prairie. The principal built feature of the farm is the former chicken coop, set midway between Levee Road and the river, where Leopold spent his time; there is also a small outhouse nearby. The soil in the region is sandy, the result of deposition during the Cambrian Period that was reworked by the Wisconsin glaciation.

Leopold's writings on conservation and the environment were significantly influenced by this landscape. A Sand County Almanac, a compilation of his writings, is widely regarded as one of the most influential works on conservationism of the 20th century. Leopold wrote the essay, "Marshland Elegy," in 1937 which warned that sandhill cranes could become extinct in Wisconsin and the upper Midwest as the species had dwindled to just 25 breeding pairs in Wisconsin.

== See also ==
- List of National Historic Landmarks in Wisconsin
- National Register of Historic Places listings in Sauk County, Wisconsin
