= Land stewardship =

Land stewardship has various connotations across the world but the common underlying theme is caring for a piece of land regardless of its ownership taking into consideration ecological, economic, social, and cultural dimensions.

== Background and definition ==
A closely connected term is land ethic coined by American environmentalist Aldo Leopold. While land ethic is considered a theoretical and philosophical framework that has its roots in the environmentalism of the United States, Land stewardship as a movement is slowly gaining traction in European countries, most notably in Spain where it even has legal recognition. According to Forest Europe, the concept of Land stewardship was introduced in 2003 by the Xarxa de Custòdia del Territori (Catalan Land Stewardship Network), an NGO actively working to promote land stewardship as a conservation strategy in Catalonia. The term has been defined by Xarxa de Custòdia del Territori as "…a conservation strategy that involves a wide range of civil society stakeholders. Nature, biodiversity, ecological integrity, cultural heritage and landscape values are maintained and restored through voluntary agreements between landowners/users and land stewardship organisations, General Administration, funding institutions and research centres, usually act as enabling agents". These voluntary agreements or contracts have been recognised by the Catalan Civil Code (2017).

== Related concepts ==
The concept of land stewardship is closely connected but not exactly the same as a Land trust or Environmental stewardship. While Land trusts can also be an arrangement between two individuals, land stewardship is explicitly undertaken in the interest of ecological, social and cultural values, and is therefore often a particular type of land trust. Furthermore, land stewardship is broader than environmental stewardship, as it connects land to community, and the importance of not only ecological sustainability, but also the sustainability of social and cultural practices, values and benefits.

== Examples ==
=== Mas Blanco in Spain ===
A very interesting case of the application of Land Stewardship can be found in the project carried out by the Spanish association Recartografías that takes place in Mas Blanco, located in the municipality of San Agustín (Teruel).

==== Overview ====
Mas Blanco is one of the fifteen neighbourhoods belonging to the municipality of San Agustin which has approximately 119 inhabitants and is located in Teruel region of Gúdar-Javalambre. More correctly, Mas Blanco can be described as a mas or masada, terms that designate a type of rural construction and exploitation model. Mas Blanco is included within the so-called Celtiberian mountain range or "South Lapland", a territory that covers about 65.000 km^{2} and includes municipalities of ten Spanish provinces (Soria, Teruel, Guadalajara, Cuenca, Valencia, Castellón, Zaragoza, Burgos, Segovia and La Rioja) with a population density of approximately 7,34 inhab/km^{2}.

The origin of Mas Blanco can be dated back to the first half of the 19th century, when the arrival of some families from Gúdar mountain range took place. They were probably looking for more proper lands and less harsh climatic conditions. In the middle of the 20th century, shortly before the rural exodus began, in Mas Blanco almost a hundred people lived, constituting one of the most important neighbourhoods in the area.

Mas Blanco's constructions were built up using local materials that the surrounding environment provides. It is interesting to point out that Mas Blanco has a curious rainwater collection system. The existence of underground cisterns located under the houses allows the storage of the water that fell on roofs of corrals and houses and that is conducted using something similar to gutters placed on the roofs. Mas Blanco's inhabitants devised this system due to the lack of sources or rivers in the vicinity.

The main activities that the inhabitants carried out and that made up their livelihood were on the one hand, the cultivation of vine, various types of cereal, as well as sheep farming. On the other hand, most of the houses had pens with pigs, chickens and rabbits, which complemented their diet and allowed them to elaborate sausages and hams. It was common to exchange those products, together with wine, with visitors. They also often travelled to other population centers in order to exchange products. Those exchanges made it possible for Mas Blanco's neighbours to obtain rice, oil, fruits, vegetables but also clothes, medicines or tools.

It is also important to add that life in Mas Blanco, as well as in many rural areas, was not idyllic due to the harsh life conditions. Inhabitants needed to perform intense work in order to maintain themselves, to which must be added the lack of basic services such as a doctor, a school or running water. Some examples are the fact that Mas Blanco's inhabitants had to go to the neighbouring mas called "El Pozo de la Muela", three kilometres away, in order to pick up water from the fountain using jugs, or to wash the clothes in the puddle there. Also, children had to travel several kilometers to go to the school, and in case of emergency it was needed to go on horseback to San Agustin (1 km away) to bring the doctor. However, the difficult conditions of life does not mean that those life models were less worthy.

==== Social organisation ====
As mentioned below, the lack of basic services led Mas Blanco's inhabitants, together with their neighbourhoods from other villages (Pozo de la Muela, Tarín Nuevo, Tarín Viejo, Casa Carrasco and Los Linares), to the creation of a community based society called "La Humanitaria". Its creation took place in 1919 and the basic goal was to guarantee mutual aid and relief in the event of illness and death. One of the main tasks of this organisation was the creation of a common annual fund for the payment of the doctor, as well as the organization between the neighbourhoods in order to assist the sick or deceased.

Communal traits of social organization can be also found looking at the communal buildings. These buildings were built up by and for the masoveros, the inhabitants of Mas Blanco. The storage of rainwater was possible thanks to the cistern (aljibe), built with a seven-meter vault, and allowed the watering of the livestock. The building for the pressing of the vine and storage of the wine was managed in a way that according to the quantity of vine that each family harvested, they took the equivalent amount in wine. Another important example is the common oven. Every 15 days, each family was in charge of turning on it in order to reach the right temperature for cooking food such as bread. Furthermore, Mas Blanco's inhabitants, due to the fact of the hard winters and the insecurity of the paths during the postwar period that followed the Spanish Civil War, decided to carry out the project of building a school for their children. After getting the permission of the Civil Government, the inhabitants were the ones that managed to build up the building which was finished in the 1950. Together with the school, a house for the teacher was constructed as well. Another example of communal practices in Mas Blanco and San Agustin's area can be found in the so-called "luck of firewood", which has lasted until today. Every year the city council raffles municipal and communal forest plots so that neighbourhoods are associated to a plot in which they can collect firewood to heat the houses.

It is also interesting to point out that money and monetary relations were not regular in neighbourhoods like this one. As mentioned previously, the barter of products played a fundamental and significant role.

==== The Project ====
Recartografías is a territory custody association dedicated to the study of rural heritage and depopulation. It was born precisely as an investigation-action association in 2014. The motivation that led the founders was their concern about the consequences of the depopulation of the rural world, specifically in Spain, and its consequences both in terms of cultural loss and environmental degradation (the latter caused by the abandonment of the Mediterranean mountain, which has a close relationship with human beings).

The original objectives of the project were to avoid the ruin of several buildings and to recover community use through land stewardship, trying to restart old activities but also new ones. The land stewardship agreement was signed with the local administration, establishing that the latter had to transfer the management of the neighbourhood's communal buildings to the association. This voluntary agreement, without economic use, has not only the objective of reactivating the social fabric and community organization in Mas Blanco but also to rediscover the history and environmental and cultural heritage of this area. Similar agreements have been reached with some owners and ancient inhabitants. Another important idea that the association performs is the interest for the inhabitants, in other words, the importance to let them to take part of the project and to get involved in the local environment instead of having a sufficient attitude. This is very important to achieve that locals perceive the project as something important and meaningful not only for them but for their place.

Despite the fact of the significant deterioration of the buildings, some of them have already been recovered by the members of the association themselves with the help of volunteers using mainly traditional, low-impact construction techniques. Nowadays Recartografías has achieved the recovery of the school, the common oven and the teacher's house. They have been doing some maintenance tasks in other buildings and spaces as well as signaling tasks. The result of this work has been that several buildings can be used again and some of them are part of one of the most important projects of the association: the rural museum (Museo de las Masías y de la Memoria Rural, in Spanish).

The museum, inaugurated in February 2019, has the main objective of showing and recovering the culture of masoveros, it is said how was the life there and how was their relation with the environment and surroundings. Furthermore, some important historical episodes and its consequences are reviewed as well, such as the Spanish Civil War and postwar period or the intense rural exodus and therefore the rural depopulation. Eight visitable spaces are part of the museum: the teacher's house, the school, the common oven, the pressing building, a cellar, the cistern (aljibe) and a shelter and command post of the Civil War. Behind the final result there is not only a hard task of recovering the buildings but also a very important task of research.

Disclosure, research and sharing knowledge are significant tasks for Recartografías as well. The association promotes an educational space called "La Universidad de las Masías". Within this project, Recartografías organises an annual seminar in the University of Valencia with the aim to address an issue related to the rural world. Moreover, in August 2019 took place the first summer course in Mas Blanco, named "Architecture, environment and socio-politics in the masovero world". This course had talks, excursions and practical workshops in order to learn more about the masovero’s culture, the rural environment and the challenges that the rural world faces. Not only that, Recartografias organises visits to the museum and some playful days in Mas Blanco directed to the use of the communal oven or a camp with boys scouts, among others. Moreover, the association been participating in some researches related to different aspects of the rural environment not only in Mas Blanco.

Some outcomes of the activity that Recartografias has been doing since 2014 are the direct enrichment of the participants; an increased visibility of Mas Blanco, its surroundings and therefore of the importance and challenges of the rural world; the enhancement of different ways of life and rural knowledge; the return of some Mas Blanco's inhabitants after several years to attend the re-opening of the school, among others; the awakening of the consciousness of many of them about the value that their life had; the meeting of different people interested and concerned about similar issues and the possibility to create network.

==== An example to think about new ways of commoning ====
Despite the fact that there has not been a real return of communal goods in this village, the renewal of Mas Blanco in the form of land stewardship can be seen as a form of commoning. It is a project that tries to break with capitalist logic that pursues profit, and tries to pursue, safeguard and revalorise other ways of organising social life. We see this in the fact that the houses were rebuilt in an ecologically sustainable way, while using traditional materials. That way, the traditional architectural style was revived and saved from ruins. People also built a room that was meant to be a space for both cultural expression and workshops related to ecology and other fields. They also rehabilitated the communal oven, thereby not only revaluing traditional baking methods, but also showing that this oven can be communally owned, and need not be privatised.

As has been already pointed out, one of the most important outcomes of the project for the association is the change in the way that the people that had to leave Mas Blanco and the surrounding neighbourhoods perceive this space. Different neighbours returned to their place of origin to rebuild their properties. Many of them had not been in town for years, even decades. The recovery of common spaces and the organisation of activities have favoured that social relations happen again in Mas Blanco. Communal goods and common spaces have made possible the recovery of meeting spaces and therefore the social practices that are likely to appear.

It can also be said that through this commoning practice, not only the people that has collaborated with the association has had the opportunity to experience and reflect about the rural world, but also and very important: people that came from this rural place or that live there have experimented a subjective process and therefore a psychological shift which has empowered them in the sense of dignifying and appreciate their lifestyles, culture, knowledge and the rural space. Hence, the recovery of the materiality of some communal goods has led to a continuous transformation of the space and the interactions that take place between people, favouring subjectivation and learning processes.

=== The Sonoma Land Trust of California ===
The Sonoma Land Trust is a land trust located in Sonoma County, in California. Its mission is to take care of the land of Sonoma county and protect its beauty and vitality. This means they conserve the natural area and protect its biodiversity and wildlife. However, as they say, it is not only about the natural world: land is the heart of the community. They are convinced that a healthy environment promotes a healthy community. They also aim to make this land accessible to the community and help local farmers. Finally, they reach out to school children to increase their experience with sustainable land practices, and actively encourage volunteer participation. Though the land trust is a private organisation, it is enabling a protection of nature from unsustainable economic exploitation, while creating benefits freely accessible to the whole community, and offering people the experience of working with nature.

=== The Land Stewardship Centre of Canada ===
The Land Stewardship Centre is a private, non-profit organisation dedicated to steward farmland, promote sustainable agriculture and to develop sustainable communities. This organisation has as its core values stewardship, justice and democracy.

Some of their goals include:

- Opposing consolidation of land ownership and increasing land access for small- and mid-sized farmers. This means we work to ensure access to beginning farmers, indigenous people, people of color, women, existing small- and mid-sized farmers, and low-income people.
- Working to keep small- and mid-sized farmers on the land by winning major reforms to farm policy that will support families currently living and working on the land, further preventing land consolidation.
- Creating new, alternative, and creative solutions for secure land tenure for farmers, including farming cooperatives and community land trusts.

They also aim to advance "our own narrative of food and farming that rejects the dominant narrative that tells us corporate agriculture feeds the world, that only profits matter, and that all of us are on our own. Our narrative will lift up what we know is true — we can accomplish much more together than we can alone, that the land and the people who work with it are what sustain and feeds us, and that a better food and farming system is possible."

The Land Stewardship Centre realises that land stewardship is not just about ecological conservation. It is related to a different organisation of land access and agriculture, that benefits communities. Therefore, they aim to create land as commons, whereby people can take control of the land they live on, and through mutual aid and solidarity provide for their own needs. It proposes explicitly to think about the social good, rather than profits.

== See also ==
- Custòdia del territori
- Land ethic
- Land trust
- Environmental stewardship
