= A Sand County Almanac =

Book by Aldo Leopold

- First edition
- Author: Aldo Leopold
- Cover artist: Charles Schwartz
- Language: English
- Subject: Ecology, Environmentalism
- Publisher: Oxford University Press
- Publication date: 1949
- Publication place: United States
- Pages: 240 pp
- ISBN: 0-19-500777-8
- OCLC: 3799061

A Sand County Almanac: And Sketches Here and There is a 1949 non-fiction book by American ecologist, forester, and environmentalist Aldo Leopold. Describing the land around the author's home in Sauk County, Wisconsin, the collection of essays advocate Leopold's idea of a "land ethic", or a responsible relationship existing between people and the land they inhabit. Edited and published by his son, Luna, a year after Leopold's death, the book is considered a landmark in the American conservation movement. Interspersed throughout the book are illustrations by American wildlife artist Charles W. Schwartz.

The book has had over two million copies printed and has been translated into at least fourteen languages. It has informed and changed the environmental movement and stimulated a widespread interest in ecology as a science.

== Overview ==
A Sand County Almanac is a combination of natural history, scene painting with words, and philosophy. It is perhaps best known for the following quote, which defines Leopold's land ethic: "A thing is right when it tends to preserve the integrity, stability, and beauty of the biotic community. It is wrong when it tends otherwise." The original publication format was issued by Oxford University Press in 1949. It incorporated a number of previously published essays that Leopold had been contributing to popular hunting and conservation magazines, along with a set of longer, more philosophical essays. The final format was assembled by Luna Leopold shortly after his father's death, but based closely on notes that presumably reflected Aldo Leopold's intentions. Subsequent editions have changed both the format and the content of the essays included in the original.

In the original publishing, the book begins with a set of essays under the heading "Sand County Almanac," which is divided into twelve segments, one for each month. These essays mostly follow the changes in the ecology on Leopold's farm near Baraboo, Wisconsin. (There is, in fact, no "Sand County" in Wisconsin. The term "sand counties" refers to a section of the state marked by sandy soils). There are anecdotes and observations about flora and fauna reactions to the seasons as well as mentions of conservation topics.

The second section of the book, "Sketches Here and There," shifts the rhetorical focus from time to place. The essays are thematically organized around farms and wildernesses in Canada, Mexico and the United States. Some of these essays are autobiographical. "Red Legs Kicking," for example, recounts Leopold's boyhood experience of hunting in Iowa. The seminal essay "Thinking Like a Mountain" recalls another hunting experience later in life that was formative for Leopold's later views. Here Leopold describes the death of a she-wolf killed by his party during a time when conservationists were operating under the assumption that elimination of top predators would make game plentiful. The essay provides a non-technical characterization of the trophic cascade where the removal of single species carries serious implications for the rest of the ecosystem.

The book ends with a section of philosophical essays grouped together under the heading "The Upshot". Here Leopold explores ironies of conservation: in order to promote wider appreciation of wild nature and engender necessary political support, one encourages recreational usage of wilderness that ultimately destroys it. Musings on "trophies" contrasts the way that some need a physical specimen to prove their conquest into the wilderness, though photographs may be less damaging than a trophy head to be mounted on the wall. He suggests that the best trophy is the experience of wilderness itself, along with its character-building aspects. Leopold also rails against the way that policy makers need to find an economic motive for conservation. In the concluding essay, "The Land Ethic", Leopold delves into a more appropriate rationale for conservation. In "The Ecological Conscience" section, he wrote: "Conservation is a state of harmony between men and land." Leopold felt it was generally agreed that more conservation education was needed; however quantity and content were up for debate. He believed that land is not a commodity to be possessed; rather, humans must have mutual respect for Earth in order not to destroy it. He philosophizes that humans will cease to be free if they have no wild spaces in which to roam.

== Importance and influence ==
In a 1990 poll of the membership by the American Nature Study Society, A Sand County Almanac and Rachel Carson's Silent Spring stand alone as the two most venerated and significant environmental books of the 20th century. The book was little noticed when published but, during the environmental awakening of the 1970s, a paperback edition turned into a surprise bestseller.

The book has had immense popular influence and has been described as: "one of the benchmark titles of the ecological movement", "a major influence on American attitudes toward our natural environment", "recognized as a classic piece of outdoor literature, rivaling Thoreau's Walden".

The book has also had great influence on environmental thinkers: "along with Walden and Rachel Carson’s Silent Spring, one of the main intellectual underpinnings of environmentalism in America". The book has "attracted such overwhelming attention from environmental philosophers as a source of inspiration and ideas".

Leopold's home, Aldo Leopold Shack and Farm, was listed on the U.S. National Register of Historic Places in 1978, and was uplisted to National Historic Landmark status in 2009.

== See also ==
- Conservation in the United States
- Environmental history of the United States
- Environmental ethics
