= Julie Lockwood =

American ecologist and academic

- Born: Julie L. Lockwood
- Education: Georgia Southern University (BS, MS); University of Tennessee (PhD)
- Scientific career
- Fields: Conservation Biology; Invasion Ecology
- Workplaces: Rutgers University
- Thesis: Assembling ecological communities : investigations into theory and applications (1991)
- Doctoral advisor: Stuart L. Pimm
- Doctoral students: José R. Ramírez-Garofalo
- Website: www.lockwoodlab.com/people

Julie L. Lockwood (born September 17, 1969) is an American ecologist who is a professor in the Department of Ecology, Evolution, and Natural Resources at Rutgers University since 2004. She was the Interim Director of the Institute of Earth, Ocean, and Atmospheric Sciences from February 2022- September 2023. Her research investigates how invasive species impact natural ecosystems. In 2022, she was elected a Fellow of the American Association for the Advancement of Science.

== Early life and education ==
Lockwood was an undergraduate student in biology at Georgia Southern University. Her masters research investigated passerine communities. She moved to the University of Tennessee for her doctorate in zoology, where she studied the assembly of ecological communities.

== Research and career ==
Lockwood studies how invasive species impact their environments. She has studied how humans have impacted biodiversity, and designed interventions to slow the rate of species extinctions. Her research has contributed to the protection of native species across the United States. She served as Champion of "Rutgers Earth 2100", a research activity that will monitor regional weather dynamics as a model to manage climate change. She proposed that Earth 2100 would work with decision makers to link science to policy action, protecting the biological rich and culturally diverse communities of New Jersey.

In 2022, Lockwood was made Chair of the Rutgers University Climate Change Task Force. She was named Director of the Institute of Earth, Ocean, and Atmospheric Sciences in 2022.

== Awards and honors ==
- 2018 Rutgers University in Research Excellence Award
- 2020 Excellence in Mentoring of Graduate Students
- 2020 Elected a Fellow of the Ecological Society of America
- 2022 Elected a Fellow of the American Association for the Advancement of Science

== Selected publications ==
- McKinney ML; Lockwood JL (November 1, 1999). "Biotic homogenization: a few winners replacing many losers in the next mass extinction". Trends in Ecology & Evolution. 14 (11): 450–453. doi:10.1016/s0169-5347(99)01679-1. ISSN 0169-5347. PMID 10511724. Wikidata Q45241136.
- Julie L Lockwood; Phillip Cassey; Tim Blackburn (May 1, 2005). "The role of propagule pressure in explaining species invasions". Trends in Ecology & Evolution. 20 (5): 223–228. doi:10.1016/j.tree.2005.02.004. ISSN 0169-5347. PMID 16701373. Wikidata Q51727250.
- Anthony Ricciardi; Martha F. Hoopes; Michael P. Marchetti; Julie L. Lockwood (August 2013). "Progress toward understanding the ecological impacts of nonnative species". Ecological Monographs. 83 (3): 263–282. doi:10.1890/13-0183.1. ISSN 0012-9615. Wikidata Q56487876.
