= Tony Sinclair (biologist) =

- Born: Anthony Ronald Entrican Sinclair; March 25, 1944 (age 82); Zambia
- Education: University of Oxford
- Known for: Serengeti research
- Awards: Fellow of the Royal Society (2002); Fellow of the Royal Society of Canada (1996)
- Scientific career
- Fields: Zoology
- Workplaces: University of British Columbia
- Thesis: Studies of the ecology of the East African buffalo (1971)
- Doctoral advisor: Niko Tinbergen
- Doctoral students: Stan Boutin
- Website: www.zoology.ubc.ca/person/sinclair

Anthony Ronald Entrican Sinclair FRSC FRS (born March 25, 1944) is a professor emeritus of zoology at the University of British Columbia.

== Education and early life ==
The son of Sir Ronald Ormiston Sinclair, Tony Sinclair spent his early childhood in the African bush in Tanzania, where his love for Africa and animals led him to study for degrees in zoology at Pembroke College, Oxford. For his doctoral dissertation, Sinclair conducted research into the ecology of African Buffalo under Niko Tinbergen at the University of Oxford with supervision from Hugh Lamprey at the Serengeti Research Institute.

== Research and career ==
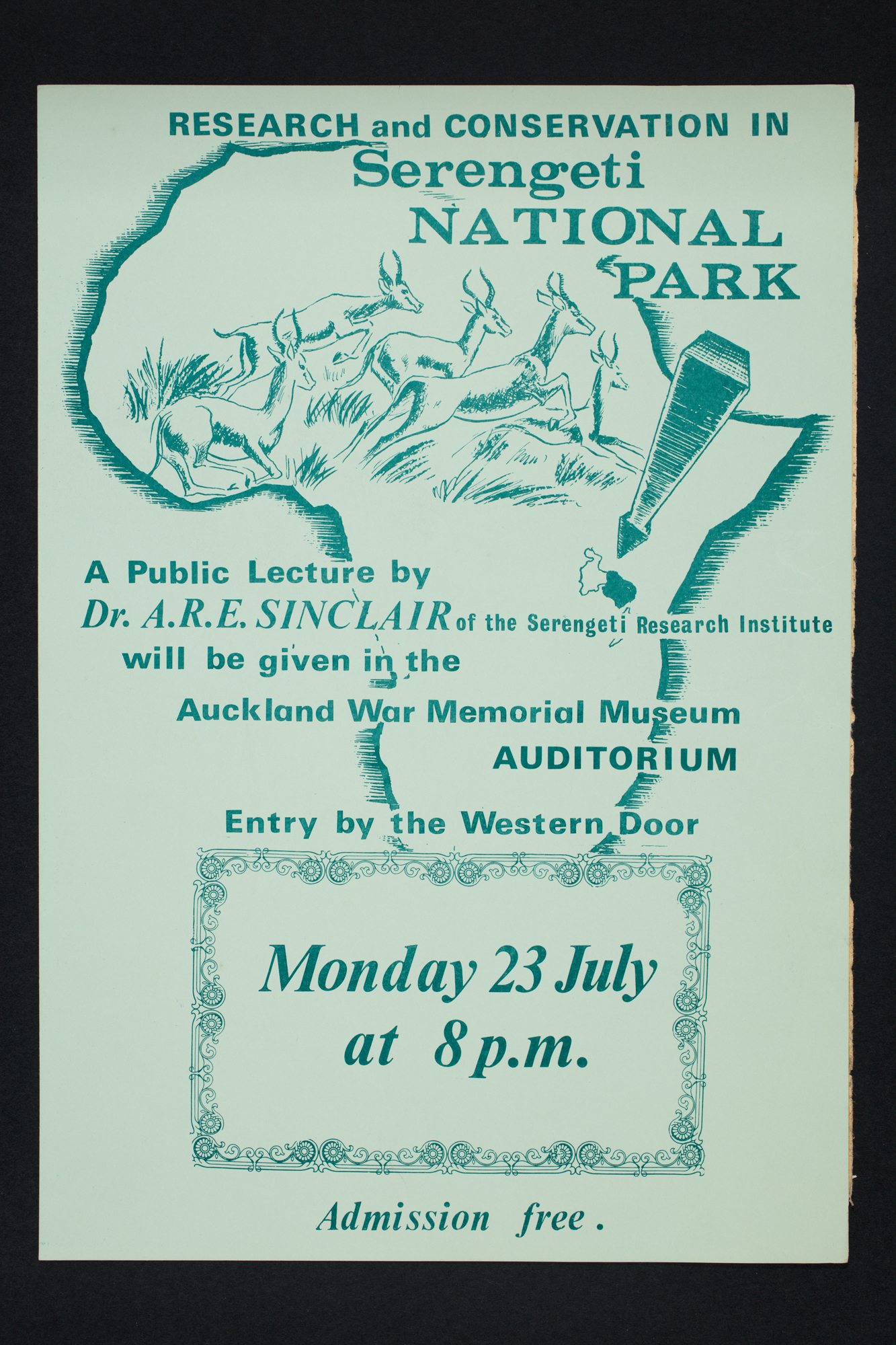

Sinclair is an ecologist and leading authority on the ecology, population dynamics and community structures of large mammals. He is the former Director of the Biodiversity Research Center at UBC. His work is of importance for the management and conservation of the environment in Africa, North America and Australia. He is particularly interested in the areas of predator sensitive foraging, predator–prey theory, migration and the regulation of populations.

By conducting long-term research on large mammals in the Mara–Serengeti ecosystem and elsewhere in East Africa, Sinclair showed the ways in which different animal populations are regulated. In the Mara-Serengeti ecosystem his research demonstrated periodic rinderpest outbreaks acted as a limiting factor for buffalo and wildebeest until the 1950s when rinderpest was greatly reduced by a vaccination program. He has also investigated how plant-eating animals are able to co-exist with each other, even when they have overlapping food sources. For example, he analyzed Thomson Gazelle, wildebeest, and buffalo populations dynamics in the Mara-Serengeti ecosystem. His research showed that larger ungulates, such as wildebeest and buffalo, have food-limited populations, meaning their respective populations are limited by intraspecific competition. However, smaller ungulates, such as Thomson gazelle, have predator-limited populations because there are so many predator species that prey upon them in the Mara-Serengeti. Interestingly, zebras, although large, appear to have a predator-limited population because of low first-year survival rates.

Sinclair's research has also extended beyond just large mammals. His group in the Serengeti researched vegetation characteristics of the highly dynamic Mara-Serengeti ecosystem. One paper published by his group, asserted that the reduction in abundance of a certain broad-leaved thicket was due to an increase in the grazers after a rinderpest outbreak in the early 20th century, frequent fires, and competition from grasses near streams and rivers. Secondly, his group found that wildebeest population recovery after disease outbreak resulted in less widespread bush fires and changes in tree density. These changes in tree density may have resulted in a change in the species abundance and richness of birds within Serengeti. Finally, his research in the early 2000s focused on transitions between savanna and woodland, and vice versa, and the factors affecting the transitions (elephants, bush fire, grazers). Sinclair's research has shown that all trophic levels and abiotic factors interact to create the complex and dynamic ecosystems we observe.

Sinclair and his work are featured prominently in his book, The Serengeti Story, released in 2012, and the documentary film, The Serengeti Rules, which was released in 2018.

== Awards and honours ==
In 1996, he was elected a Fellow of the Royal Society of Canada (FRSC) and he was elected a Fellow of the Royal Society (FRS) in 2002.
