= The Serengeti Rules =

- Directed by: Nicolas Brown
- Produced by: David Allen
- Starring: Greg Kriek; Ashlyn Jade Lopez; Johnathan Newport
- Cinematography: Tim Cragg
- Edited by: Andy R. Worboys
- Music by: Anne Nikitin
- Production companies: HHMI Tangled Bank Studios; Passion Planet
- Distributed by: Abramorama
- Release dates: April 21, 2018 (Tribeca); May 10, 2019 (United States)
- Running time: 84 minutes
- Country: United States
- Language: English

The Serengeti Rules is a 2018 American documentary film directed by Nicolas Brown and based on the book by Sean B. Carroll. The film explores the discoveries of five pioneering scientists—Tony Sinclair, Mary E. Power, Bob Paine, John Terborgh, and Jim Estes—whose decades of research laid the groundwork for modern ecology and offer hope that environmentalists today may be able to “upgrade” damaged ecosystems by understanding the rules that govern them.

The film was produced by David Allen. Executive producers are David Guy Elisco, John Battsek, and Dennis WC. Liu. The Serengeti Rules received support from Science Sandbox, an initiative of the Simons Foundation. The Serengeti Rules premiered April 21, 2018, at the Tribeca Film Festival and was released theatrically in select theaters in North America beginning on May 10, 2019, at the Quad Cinema in New York City. The Serengeti Rules aired as an episode of the PBS series Nature on October 9, 2019.

The Serengeti Rules features the song “Society”, performed by Eddie Vedder, and written by Jerry Hannan.

== Synopsis ==
Beginning in the 1960s, a small band of young scientists went into the wilderness, driven by an insatiable curiosity about how nature works. Immersed in some of the most remote and spectacular places on Earth—from the majestic Serengeti to the Amazon jungle; from the Arctic Ocean to Pacific tide pools—they discovered a single set of rules that govern all life. Now in the twilight of their eminent careers, these five unsung heroes of modern ecology—Bob Paine, Jim Estes, Mary Power, Tony Sinclair, and John Terborgh—share the stories of their adventures and how their pioneering work flipped our view of nature on its head. Across the globe, they discovered that among the millions of species on our planet, some are far more important than others. They called these species keystone species, because they hold the natural world together.

The role of keystone species is both revelatory and surprising: sea otters help kelp forests flourish, supporting everything from salmon to eagles; wolves enable rivers to run clear and help forests thrive; and the humble wildebeest controls the numbers of trees, butterflies, elephants, and even giraffes on the savanna.

Unfortunately, these deep connections also work in reverse. When keystones are removed, ecosystems unravel and collapse—a phenomenon no one had imagined—or understood until their revolutionary discoveries. But with new knowledge also comes new hope, and these same visionaries reveal the remarkable resilience of nature—and how the rules they discovered can be used to upgrade and restore the natural world. They give us the chance to reimagine the world as it could and should be. The film is based on the book by Sean B. Carroll.

== Awards ==
The Serengeti Rules has received the following awards:

- 2019 Chuck Jonkel Scientific Legacy Award, International Wildlife Film Festival
- 2019 Best Environmental Film, Vancouver International Mountain Film Festival
- 2018 Wildscreen Panda Award: Smithsonian Channel Best Theatrical Film, Wildscreen Film Festival
- 2018 Jackson Hole Science Media Award for Editing
- 2018 Golden Owl Award, Best Science Documentary, Bergen International Film Festival
- 2018 Green Fire Award, American Conservation Film Festival
- 2018 Family Friendly Documentary, Maui Film Festival
- 2019 Best Environmental Film, Sedona International Film Festival
- 2019 Best Film, Ocean Environment; Best Film, Audience Choice; Waimea Ocean Film Festival
- 2019 Prix Grand Écran, Festival international du film scientifique Pariscience
- 2020 News & Documentary Emmy Award nominee for Best Nature Documentary.

== Cast ==
- Tony Sinclair (scientist, as himself)
- Greg Kriek (Young Tony Sinclair)
- Mary Power (scientist, as herself)
- Ashlyn Jade Lopez (Mary Power age 8)
- Samantha Nugent (Mary Power age 33)
- Bob Paine (scientist, as himself)
- Matthieson McCrae (Young Bob Paine)
- John Terborgh (scientist, as himself)
- Johnathan Newport (Young John Terborgh)
- Jim Estes (scientist, as himself)
- Jaime Excell (Young Jim Estes)
- Sean B. Carroll (scientist, as himself)
- Laurie Spiegel (Mary Power’s Mother)
