= David Read (botanist) =

Sir David Read, FRS, is Emeritus Professor of Plant Science in the Department of Animal and Plant Sciences at the University of Sheffield. His first degree and PhD came from the University of Hull, the latter in 1963. He also serves on the Rothamsted Research Board of Directors.

Read's research focuses on plant and fungal physiology and ecology, particularly the biology of root-fungus symbioses.

== Honours and awards ==
Read was elected a Fellow of the Royal Society in 1990 and was formerly its Vice President and Biological Secretary until 2008, when he was succeeded by Professor Dame Jean Thomas. He was the 2002 recipient of the Kempe Award for Distinguished Ecologists. He was knighted in 2007. The same year, he was made an honorary doctor at Lund University.

== Works ==
- Francis, R.; Read, D. J. (January 1984). "Direct transfer of carbon between plants connected by vesicular–arbuscular mycorrhizal mycelium". Nature. 307 (5946): 53–56. Bibcode:1984Natur.307...53F. doi:10.1038/307053a0. ISSN 0028-0836. S2CID 4310303.
