= Ralph Raitt =

American ornithologist (1929–2000)

- Born: February 9, 1929; Santa Ana, California
- Died: December 12, 2000 (aged 71); Las Cruces, New Mexico
- Education: Stanford University (BS), University of California, Berkeley (PhD)
- Awards: Guggenheim Fellowship
- Scientific career
- Fields: Ornithology
- Workplaces: New Mexico State University
- Doctoral advisor: A. Starker Leopold
- Doctoral students: Stuart L. Pimm

Ralph J. Raitt (February 9, 1929 – December 12, 2000) was an American ornithologist and ecologist whose career spanned over three decades at New Mexico State University (NMSU).

== Life ==
Born in Santa Ana, California, Raitt developed an early love for the outdoors, particularly hunting and fishing, which later led him to biology. He earned his BA in zoology from Stanford University in 1950 and completed his Ph.D. at the University of California, Berkeley in 1959, focusing on California Quail under the mentorship of A. Starker Leopold.

Raitt joined NMSU's Department of Biology in 1958, where he worked as Curator of Birds and played a significant role in developing the university's scientific bird collection. His research spanned ornithological studies across the western United States, Mexico, Central America, and South America. He was particularly known for his meticulous fieldwork, studying bird species such as quail, bushtits, thrushes, and New World jays, often conducting research in rugged and undeveloped locations. His work on Neotropical ornithology provided key insights into bird communities, especially in the Chihuahuan Desert, often in collaboration with graduate students.

Raitt's distinguished career earned him multiple honors. In 1967–1968, he received a John Simon Guggenheim Memorial Fellowship to conduct research in Costa Rica and Venezuela. He was awarded NMSU's Westhafer Award in 1970, the institution's most prestigious academic recognition. He also served as a Fulbright-Hays Senior Lecturer in Colombia in 1976 and as a Visiting Lecturer in Ecology in Mexico in 1980.

In addition to his research, Raitt contributed to scientific publishing as Editor of The Condor from 1969 to 1971 and Studies in Avian Biology from 1974 to 1985.

== Honors and distinctions ==
Ralph Riatt was a recipient of:

- John Simon Guggenheim Memorial Fellowship (1967–1968)
- Westhafer Award, New Mexico State University (1970)

== Professional and public service ==
- Editor of The Condor (1969–1971)
- Editor of Studies in Avian Biology (1974–1985)
