= F. Stuart Chapin III =

American ecologist (born 1944)

F. Stuart Chapin III (or Terry Chapin) (born February 2, 1944) is a professor emeritus of Ecology at the Department of Biology and Wildlife of the Institute of Arctic Biology, University of Alaska. He was President of the Ecological Society of America (ESA) from August 2010 until 2011.

The grandson of sociologist F. Stuart Chapin and son of regional planner F. Stuart Chapin, Jr., Chapin III is better known to students and colleagues as 'Terry'. Chapin served as principal investigator of the Bonanza Creek Long-Term Ecological Research (LTER) program (1996-2010) and directed the graduate educational program in Resilience and Adaptation (2001-2011) at the University of Alaska, Fairbanks. He has a background in plant physiological ecology and ecosystem ecology. His research addresses the effects of changes in climate and wildfire on Alaskan ecology and rural communities. He explores ways that communities and agencies can increase sustainability of ecosystems and human communities over the long term despite rapid climatic and social changes. In this way, society can proactively shape changes toward a more sustainable future. He pursues this internationally through the Resilience Alliance, nationally through the Ecological Society of America, and in Alaska through partnerships with rural indigenous communities. As President of ESA, he focused on the "critical issue" of planetary stewardship. With Mary Power and Steward Pickett, Chapin led a Planetary Stewardship initiative "whose goal is to reorient society toward a more sustainable relationship with the biosphere."

In 2019 Terry Chapin received the Volvo Environment Prize. The jury citation states: "Professor Terry Chapin is not only a world-leading ecologist, he is also one of the world's most profound thinkers and actors on stewardship of the Earth System. [...] His work will have a long-lasting impact on the ways we seek to build a sustainable future, with the concept of Earth Stewardship supporting the deep institutional and structural change required to meet the challenges ahead."

== Academic career ==
| 1966 | BA in Biology, Swarthmore College |
| 1966–1968 | Visiting Instructor in Biology (Peace Corps) Universidad Javeriana, Bogotá, Colombia |
| 1973 | Ph.D. in Biological Sciences, Stanford University |
| 1973–1984 | Assistant/Assoc. Professor, University of Alaska Fairbanks |
| 1981–1983 | Assistant Director, Institute of Arctic Biology, University of Alaska Fairbanks |
| 1984–1989 | Professor, University of Alaska Fairbanks |
| 1989–1998 | Professor of Integrative Biology, University of California, Berkeley |
| 1996-2011 | Professor, University of Alaska Fairbanks |
| 2011- | Professor Emeritus, University of Alaska Fairbanks |

== Awards, grants, and honors ==
- Guggenheim Fellowship, 1979–1980
- Kempe Award for Distinguished Ecologists, 1996
- Hill Professor, 1995 (Univ. of Minnesota)
- Member Ecology Institute (Germany) 1986-
- Usibelli Award (top researcher in all fields; Univ. of Alaska) 2000
- Fellow of the American Association for the Advancement of Science 2000
- Member Royal Swedish Academy of Agriculture and Forestry 2000
- Outstanding faculty member, University of Alaska (selected by students) 2002
- Fellow of American Academy of Arts and Sciences 2002
- Member National Academy of Sciences 2004
- US Forest Service Wilderness Research Award on behalf of the Resilience and Adaptation Program.
- Sustainability Science Award, 2008 (F. Stuart Chapin, III and Colleagues). Ecological Society of America
- Fellow of the Ecological Society of America 2012
- Alexander von Humboldt Award, International Association of Vegetation Science 2017
- Eminent Ecologist Award, Ecological Society of America 2018
- Volvo Environment Prize 2019

== Notable publications ==
- Chapin, F S (1980). "The Mineral Nutrition of Wild Plants". Annual Review of Ecology and Systematics. 11 (1): 233–260. doi:10.1146/annurev.es.11.110180.001313. ISSN 0066-4162.
- Chapin III, F. Stuart; Zavaleta, Erika S.; Eviner, Valerie T.; Naylor, Rosamond L.; Vitousek, Peter M.; Reynolds, Heather L.; Hooper, David U.; Lavorel, Sandra; Sala, Osvaldo E.; Hobbie, Sarah E.; Mack, Michelle C. (2000). "Consequences of changing biodiversity". Nature. 405 (6783): 234–242. doi:10.1038/35012241. hdl:11336/37401. ISSN 0028-0836. PMID 10821284. S2CID 205006508.
- Chapin, F. Stuart; Shaver, Gaius R.; Giblin, Anne E.; Nadelhoffer, Knute J.; Laundre, James A. (1995). "Responses of Arctic Tundra to Experimental and Observed Changes in Climate". Ecology. 76 (3): 694–711. Bibcode:1995Ecol...76..694C. doi:10.2307/1939337. ISSN 1939-9170. JSTOR 1939337.
- Chapin, F. Stuart III (2011). Principles of terrestrial ecosystem ecology. P. A. Matson, Peter Morrison Vitousek, Melissa C. Chapin (2nd ed.). New York: Springer. ISBN 978-1-4419-9504-9. OCLC 755081405.
