= List of fellows of the Royal Society elected in 2002 =

Fellows of the Royal Society elected in 2002.

== Fellows ==
1. Allan Bradley
2. Robin Carrell
3. Michael John Crawley
4. Stuart Cull-Candy
5. John Dainton
6. Roger John Davis
7. Anne Dell
8. David Dolphin
9. David Fowler
10. Steve Furber
11. Graham Goodwin
12. Jean-Pierre Hansen
13. Nicholas Hastie
14. Christopher Hawkesworth
15. Judith Howard
16. Philip Ingham
17. David Ish-Horowicz
18. James A. Jackson
19. Bruce Ernest Kemp
20. John Vincent Kilmartin
21. David Malcolm James Lilley
22. Terry Lyons
23. Georgina Mace
24. John McCanny
25. Brian Cecil Joseph Moore
26. David Parker
27. Martyn Poliakoff
28. Eric Priest
29. Terence Quinn
30. Peter John Ratcliffe
31. Mary Rees
32. Miles Reid
33. David Rhind
34. Thomas Maurice Rice
35. Roy Sambles
36. Peter Sarnak
37. Anthony Ronald Entrican Sinclair
38. Andrew Benjamin Smith
39. Anthony John Stace
40. Nicholas Strausfeld
41. Mark Welland
42. Ian Wilmut

== Foreign members ==
1. Claude Jean Allegre
2. Per Oskar Andersen
3. Hubert Simon Markl
4. Alexander Pines
5. Peter Raven
6. Carl Isaac Wunsch
