= Kempe Award for Distinguished Ecologists =

The Kempe Award for Distinguished Ecologists is a prize awarded biennially from 1994 onwards to recognise outstanding individuals within the science of ecology. The Award is an honorarium of SEK 50,000. The award is given by the Kempe Foundations (Kempefonden), Umeå University and the Swedish University of Agricultural Sciences in cooperation.

== Kempe Award Laureates ==
- 1994 Stuart L. Pimm (United States)
- 1996 F. Stuart Chapin III (United States)
- 1998 John Lawton (United Kingdom)
- 2000 Daniel Simberloff (United States)
- 2002 David Read (United Kingdom)
- 2004 Mary Power (United States)
- 2006 Peter M. Vitousek (United States)
- 2008 Stephen P. Hubbell (United States)
- 2011 Ilkka Hanski (Finland)

== See also ==
- List of ecology awards
