= James A. Estes =

American ecologist

- Born: October 2, 1945; Sacramento, California
- Died: May 20, 2025 (aged 79)
- Citizenship: United States
- Education: University of Minnesota
- Awards: C. Hart Merriam Award (2012)
- Scientific career
- Workplaces: U.S. Fish and Wildlife Service; U.S. Geological Survey; University of California, Santa Cruz (UCSC)

James Allen Estes (October 2, 1945 – May 20, 2025) was an American ecologist and Distinguished Professor at University of California, Santa Cruz (UCSC), known for his studies of sea otters and kelp forest ecology. Born in Sacramento, California, he graduated from the University of Minnesota in 1967, earned a master's degree in Biology from Washington State University in 1969, and a Ph.D. in biology and statistics from the University of Arizona in 1974. He worked for the U.S. Fish and Wildlife Service and the U.S. Geological Survey from 1974 to 2007 before joining the UCSC faculty. He is a wildlife ecologist known for his work on ecosystem effect of large predators on ecosystems, including sea otters in the Aleutian Islands of Alaska, USA. He co-edited the books The Community Ecology of Sea Otters (1988), Whales, Whaling, and Ocean Ecosystems (2007), and Trophic Cascades: Predators, Prey, and the Changing Dynamics of Nature (2010), and is the author of Serendipity: An Ecologist's Quest to Understand Nature (2016). He was elected to the National Academy of Sciences in 2014. Estes and his work are featured prominently in the 2018 documentary film The Serengeti Rules.
