= F. Stuart Chapin =

American sociologist and educator (1888–1974)

Francis Stuart Chapin (3 February 1888 – 7 July 1974) was an American sociologist and educator; he was a professor of sociology at the University of Minnesota from 1922 to 1953.

== Background ==
He received his bachelor's degree from Columbia University in 1909, as well as his PhD from the same school in 1911.

== Career ==
He taught economics at Wellesley College for one year. He then moved to Smith College where he taught sociology and served as department chair (1912–1921). In 1920 he was elected as a Fellow of the American Statistical Association.

He played an important role in creation of a quantitative, statistical sociology in the United States in the years between World War I and World War II (1920–40).

He also served as the 25th President of the American Sociological Association. He was a prime mover in the creation of the Social Science Research Council.

== Legacy ==
His grandson, F. Stuart Chapin III, is a professor of ecology at the University of Alaska.

One of his students was writer Myra Page.
