= Michelle Cailin Mack =

Ecologist

- Education: University of California, Berkeley
- Scientific career
- Thesis: Effects of exotic grass invasion on ecosystem nitrogen dynamics in a Hawaiian woodland (1998)
- Doctoral advisor: Carla D'Antonio

Michelle Cailin Mack is an ecologist working on the connections between plants and climate in polar regions. She is a fellow of the Ecological Society of America and the American Geophysical Union. She currently holds the title of Regent's Professor at Northern Arizona University.

== Education and career ==
Mack has both a B.A. and a B.S. from Evergreen State College (1990) and went on to earn a Ph.D. from the University of California, Berkeley in 1998. Following her Ph.D. she worked at the University of Alaska Fairbanks until 2002, first as a postdoc working with F. Stuart Chapin III and then as a research associate in the Institute of Arctic Biology. In 2002 she moved to the University of Florida where she was promoted to professor in 2013. In 2014 she moved to Northern Arizona University.

== Research ==
Mack's research investigations include examining how human activity and the introduction of non-native species impacts terrestrial ecosystems. For example, she has examined how changes in C_{4} grasses have changed nitrogen cycling in Hawaii Volcanoes National Park, and how changes in nutrients change the storage of carbon and bacterial communities in polar regions. Her research includes investigations of the role of fire, thermokarst lakes, and permafrost thawing on carbon cycling in polar regions.

== Selected publications ==
- Mack, Michelle C.; D'Antonio, Caria M. (1998). "Impacts of biological invasions on disturbance regimes". Trends in Ecology & Evolution. 13 (5): 195–198. Bibcode:1998TEcoE..13..195M. doi:10.1016/s0169-5347(97)01286-x. ISSN 0169-5347. PMID 21238260.
- Chapin III, F. Stuart; Zavaleta, Erika S.; Eviner, Valerie T.; Naylor, Rosamond L.; Vitousek, Peter M.; Reynolds, Heather L.; Hooper, David U.; Lavorel, Sandra; Sala, Osvaldo E.; Hobbie, Sarah E.; Mack, Michelle C.; Díaz, Sandra (2000). "Consequences of changing biodiversity". Nature. 405 (6783): 234–242. doi:10.1038/35012241. hdl:11336/37401. ISSN 0028-0836. PMID 10821284. S2CID 205006508.
- Mack, Michelle C.; Schuur, Edward A. G.; Bret-Harte, M. Syndonia; Shaver, Gaius R.; Chapin, F. Stuart (2004). "Ecosystem carbon storage in arctic tundra reduced by long-term nutrient fertilization". Nature. 431 (7007): 440–443. Bibcode:2004Natur.431..440M. doi:10.1038/nature02887. ISSN 0028-0836. PMID 15386009. S2CID 4338923.
- Mack, Michelle C.; Walker, Xanthe J.; Johnstone, Jill F.; Alexander, Heather D.; Melvin, April M.; Jean, Mélanie; Miller, Samantha N. (2021-04-16). "Carbon loss from boreal forest wildfires offset by increased dominance of deciduous trees". Science. 372 (6539): 280–283. Bibcode:2021Sci...372..280M. doi:10.1126/science.abf3903. ISSN 0036-8075. PMID 33859032. S2CID 233245004.

== Awards and honors ==
- Kavli Frontiers of Science Fellow, National Academy of Science (2008)
- Fellow, Ecological Society of America (2016)
- Fellow, American Geophysical Union (2021)
