= Stuart Pimm =

American ecologist (born 1949)

Stuart Leonard Pimm
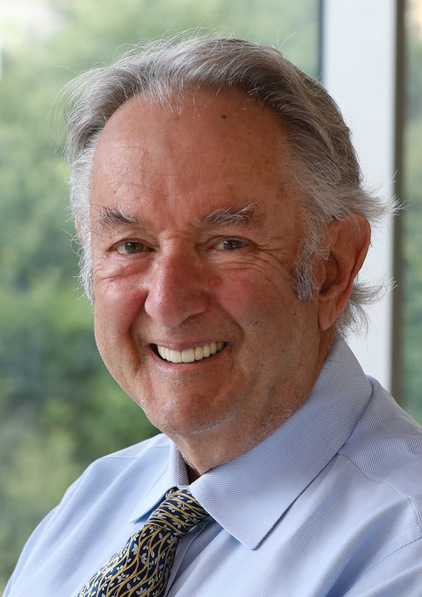
- Stuart Pimm, in 2021
- Born: February 27, 1949 (age 77); Derbyshire
- Citizenship: Joint Citizenship (USA, UK)
- Spouse: Julia Killeffer
- Awards: Fellow of the American Academy of Arts and Sciences; Kempe Award for Distinguished Ecologists; Heineken Prize; Tyler Prize for Environmental Achievement; International Cosmos Prize; World Sustainability Award
- Scientific career
- Workplaces: Duke University; University of Oxford; New Mexico State University
- Thesis: Community Process and Structure (1974)
- Doctoral advisor: Ralph Raitt
- Doctoral students: Julie L. Lockwood; Krithi Karanth
- Website: savingnature.com nicholas.duke.edu/people/faculty/pimm

Stuart Leonard Pimm (born 27 February 1949) is the Doris Duke Chair of Conservation Ecology at Duke University. His early career was as a theoretical ecologist but he now specializes in scientific research of biodiversity and conservation biology.

== Education ==
Pimm was born in Derbyshire, United Kingdom. He was educated at the University of Oxford and was awarded a PhD in Ecology from New Mexico State University in 1974.

== Research ==
Pimm is currently Doris Duke Chair of Conservation Ecology in the Nicholas School of the Environment at Duke University, Durham, North Carolina. Pimm has collaborated with a wide range of other scientists, including Robert May, Peter H. Raven, Joel E. Cohen, George Sugihara, Thomas Lovejoy, and Jared Diamond. His early work has examined the mathematical properties of food webs and indicated that complex food webs should be less stable than simple food webs. Since 1990s, he concentrated on the patterns of species extinctions, the rate of species extinction and practical methods to stop them. His research has included quantifying modern extinction rates and examining conservation approaches in tropical ecosystems.

== Publications ==
Pimm has published more than 350 peer-reviewed scientific articles, including several in the scientific journals Nature and Science. He has published several books including, A Scientist Audits the Earth and he has published articles in popular science publications such as Scientific American. Up until mid-2019, he was a regular contributor to the National Geographic blog.

== Awards ==
He is an acknowledged authority in the field of conservation biology, recognized with several awards:

- World Sustainability Award (2025)
- International Cosmos Prize (2019).
- Tyler Prize for Environmental Achievement (2010).
- Dr. A. H. Heineken Prize from the Royal Netherlands Academy of Arts and Sciences (2006).
- Edward T. LaRoe III Memorial Award from the Society of Conservation Biology (2006).
- Marsh Prize for Conservation from the Zoological Society of London (2003).

New Mexico State University made him an alumnus of the year in 2005. A new wasp species from the cloud forests of Colombia's tropical Andes has been named Dolichomitus pimmi in honor of Pimm and his conservation efforts in that region.

== SavingSpecies and Saving Nature ==
In 2010, Pimm founded a non-profit organization called SavingSpecies to preserve and restore natural habitats. In 2019, the organization was dissolved and Saving Nature was created to reflect a broader mission from the work that Saving Species has started. Saving Nature partners with local nonprofit organizations to connect fragmented habitats into biocorridors for wildlife. It works in biodiversity hotspots, such as in Colombia, Brazil, Ecuador, India, Indonesia and Tanzania. In Colombia, Pimm has worked with local organizations, on projects linking fragmented forests, including expansion of the La Mesenia - Paramillo Nature Reserve.

== Controversy ==
In 2014, Pimm was involved in a controversy related to allegedly sexist remarks he made in a book review published by the Elsevier journal Biological Conservation. Pimm's article "sparked debate on Twitter almost immediately." Pimm defended his stance by stating that the line which had received criticism was dialogue from a movie.

The journal did issue a mea culpa, indicating an opinion of Pimm's article. "We would like to inform our readers that parts of the book review Keeping Wild: Against the Domestication of the Earth by Stuart Pimm, Volume 180, pages 151–152 are denigrating to women.". Of Pimm's article, the journal admitted that "It just contains some offensive language." When challenged, Pimm responded that he did not think his "wording was sexist..." However, some disagreed. In a later letter to the editor, Amanda Stanley, then Conservation Science Program Officer at the Wilburforce Foundation, explained why Pimm's "...book review [was] so offensive." An article in The New Yorker later that year explored the debate between conservationists that led to Pimm's controversial remark. The article asserted that, in his review, "Pimm's emotions got the better of him." For his part, according to the article, Pimm was reported as being "totally unrepentant."

== Personal ==
Pimm married Julia Killeffer in 1990. He has two daughters from a previous marriage, both in the United States. He lives in Durham, North Carolina in USA but travels extensively around the world.
