= Stan Boutin =

Canadian population ecologist

- Born: 1955 (age 70–71)
- Education: University of Alberta; University of British Columbia
- Known for: Kluane Red Squirrel Project
- Scientific career
- Fields: Population ecology
- Workplaces: University of Alberta
- Thesis: An experimental analysis of juvenile survival and dispersal in snowshoe hares (1983)
- Doctoral advisor: Anthony R.E. Sinclair
- Website: uofa.ualberta.ca/biological-sciences/faculty-and-staff/academic-staff/stan-boutin

Stanley A. Boutin FRSC (born 1955) is a professor of population ecology in the University of Alberta Department of Biological Sciences. He is scientific co-director of the Alberta Biodiversity Monitoring Institute and an Alberta Biodiversity Conservation Chair.

== Select awards and recognition ==
- 2006 – Fellow, Royal Society of Canada
- 2009 – Miroslaw Romanowski Medal, Royal Society of Canada
- 2018 — C. Hart Merriam Award, American Society of Mammalogists
