= Alberta Biodiversity Monitoring Institute =

- Predecessor: Alberta Biodiversity Monitoring Program
- Formation: 1998
- Type: Collaborative monitoring
- Board of directors: Greg Taylor Chair Stephen Lougheed Shawn Wasel Secretary/Treasurer Roger Gibbins
- Affiliations: Alberta Innovates-Technology Futures; University of Alberta; University of Calgary; Royal Alberta Museum
- Budget: $11 M (2012-2013)
- Revenue: $9,513,809 (2013)
- Website: Official website, archived from the original on 2008-12-01
- Formerly called: Alberta Biodiversity Monitoring Program

Alberta Biodiversity Monitoring Institute (ABMI) is an agency that monitors and reports on biodiversity status throughout the province of Alberta, Canada, that is funded equally by the government of Alberta and the oil and gas industry. The Alberta Biodiversity Monitoring Institute is based in Edmonton, Alberta. According to Alberta Innovates-Technology Futures (AITF), a key partner in the ABMI, the ABMI, which acts as "an early warning system by monitoring the cumulative effects of biodiversity change in regions throughout Alberta" is "the largest project of its kind ever attempted in Canada." Collaborating agencies include the government-industry research agency Alberta Innovates-Technology Futures, the University of Alberta, University of Calgary and the Royal Alberta Museum. Along with the Alberta Forest Management Planning Standard, the ABMI are key components to implementing resource planning based on ecosystem management principles. Alberta Environment and Parks consults the Alberta Biodiversity Monitoring Agency's reports in monitoring and preservation of species, setting benchmarks for biodiversity for land use plans. If industry contributes to the endangerment of a species that falls below these benchmarks, the Government of Alberta can order remedial action.

== Location ==
The ABMI Science Centres are located at the University of Alberta, Alberta Innovates and the University of Calgary. Their Processing Centre is at the Royal Alberta Museum and their Information and Application Centre is at the University of Alberta. The ABMI Monitoring Centre is located at Alberta Innovates Technology Futures offices in Vegreville. Dan Farr has been Director at the Application Centre since April 2010.

== History ==
Since the 1990s it was recognized that Alberta needed a comprehensive provincial biodiversity monitoring program but at that time the province did not have the capacity to conduct such a program.

Phase 1 (1998-2002) of what was then called Alberta Biodiversity Monitoring Program (ABMP) was funded by $1 M cash from Alberta forest industries, oil and gas industries, the provincial government, and non-government organizations.

A team of more that 20 scientists identified protocols to survey a broad diversity of biota, habitat structures, vegetation communities, and landscapes patterns within Alberta. These protocols have been reviewed by other scientists from across North America and have been amalgamated into an integrated design that will effectively and efficiently survey all elements. The ABMP is designed to monitor long-term, broad-scale changes in biodiversity, many of which are anticipated to be difficult to detect because they occur slowly over time. The ABMP will facilitate comparisons among geographic regions, and will feed information into an adaptive management process so that resource managers can evaluate long-term sustainability of biodiversity and natural resources. Information and analyses generated from the ABMP will be used to delineate potential causal relationships between development events and changes in biodiversity. Above all, the ABMP is designed to be scientifically credible, transparent, and to satisfy the needs of government, industry, and the public. This program will provide early warning of biodiversity change, and reduce the cost of sustaining biodiversity by reducing the need for expensive species recovery programs.

— Alberta Research Council 2003

Between 1998 and 2003 a group of researchers reviewed literature regarding protocols for sampling terrestrial biota and habitat structures. Scientists involved in the research included "Dan Farr, Chris Shank, Rich Moses, Stan Boutin, Erin Bayne (vertebrates), Phil Lee, Steve Hanus (forest structure and vascular plants), Jennifer Doubt, Rene Belland (mosses), Anna-Liisa Sippola, Jogeir Stokland (fungi), Neville Winchester, Bert Finnamore, Jeff Battigelli, Heather Proctor (arthropods), and others." Jim Schieck, Chris Shank and Dan Farr combined these protocols into an integrated suite "designed to be cost effective and capable of monitoring a diversity of biota, over broad spatial scales and long time periods." In a 2007 interview ABMI lead scientist, Jim Schieck of the Alberta Research Council, described how the ABMI "program was developed in the last 5 years, 6 or 7 years." The team of 7 or 8 people at the University of Alberta were investigating effective management and monitoring of biota using statistical data management on species and habitats and ecosystems to set benchmarks for future reference.

Phase 2 (2003-2007) involved the development of a prototype "designed to test the protocols, develop systems and generate product streams to the satisfaction of the sponsors and potential future clients." Funding for 2003 was $675,000. By 2006 the team had completed the background scientific development and moved into the prototype project, a small scale program.

The ABMI began working in 2003 and at that time one of the ABMI projects involved working with a small company in Saskatoon to develop equipment with highly sensitive microphones to record bird vocalizations digitally that could then be interpreted in a laboratory setting. This standardized the process using "technology that records bird calls at a very fine level, and then having an expert go through the calls to identify the birds correctly."

In 2006 the Collaborative Research and Development (CRD) at the Alberta Biodiversity Monitoring Program published A Manual for Estimating Biodiversity Intactness for the Alberta Biodiversity Monitoring Program: Description and Working Example.

With funding from ABMI, a team of researchers from Alberta Research Council and the University of Alberta used winter mammal tracking sites in the boreal forest of Alberta to measure biodiversity intactness to be used as baselines in monitoring biodiversity. The "southern boreal forest had the lowest intactness and the greatest human footprint." They published their findings in an article in Biological Conservation.

However, from 2007 to 1 April 2013, the ABMI's financing and administration was not self-managed but was dependent on the University of Alberta's systems.

In 2012 the Province of Alberta passed legislation to enable the ABMI to generate and collect funds to finance their program. "New legislation to formally establish the provincial monitoring entity was expected in the fall of 2013." By February 2012 although the ABMI was "identified as a key component of the Joint Canada-Alberta Monitoring Plan and has many strong elements – scientific leadership, publicly accessible information, and value-neutral result presentation" the Institute had not secured full funding which limited "its ability to deliver sound monitoring data." By 2013 the private sector increased payments $4,190,445 from $2,896,000 in 2012. In 2012 the Government of Alberta gave $5,205,000 and increased that to $5,305,000 in 2013 when the Government of Canada decreased their funding to $0.

A 2014 ABMI report commissioned by the Canadian Oilsands Innovation Alliance (COSIA), one of ABMI's stakeholders, showed a decline of 20 per cent among bird species in northern Alberta. The report covered all three oil sands areas, Peace River, Fort McMurray and Cold Lake. ABMI board member and Pembina Institute Director, Simon Dyer, described how "what gets measured, gets managed." While "longtime agriculture on private land has a bigger footprint on northern Alberta landscape than the oilsands industry or forestry", the former is static whereas the latter are expanding and they are on Crown land where the government has more authority.

== Board of directors ==
The ABMI Board of Directors has from seven to fourteen Directors "representing the Government of Alberta, environmental non-governmental organization sector, forest sector, energy sector, agriculture sector, and the research community." The Pembina Institute and the Canadian Association of Petroleum Producers CAPP are represented on the ABMI board.

== Partners and Sponsors ==
According to the ABMI 2012-2013 Annual Report, partners and sponsors include industry, universities, governmental and non-governmental organizations: Alberta Innovates Bio Solutions, Alberta Innovates Technology Futures, Alberta Land Institute, Alberta Livestock and Meat Agency Ltd, Alberta-Pacific Forest Industries Inc, Athabasca Oil Corporation, Canadian Natural Resources Limited, Cenovus Energy, Climate Change and Emissions Management Corporation, Connacher Oil and Gas Corporation, ConocoPhillips Canada, Devon Operating Corporation (now operating as Brion Energy Corporation), Ecological Monitoring Committee for the Lower Athabasca, Environment Canada, Government of Alberta, Hammerstone Corporation, Husky Energy, Imperial Oil, Ivanhoe Energy Inc., Japan Canada Oilsands Ltd., Laricina Energy Ltd., MEG Energy, NEXEN Inc., Oilsands Developers Group, Royal Albert Museum, Shell Canada, Southern Pacific Research Corp., Statoil, Suncor Energy, Sunshine Oilsands Ltd, Syncrude, Teck Resources Ltd., Total E & P Canada Ltd., the University of Alberta and the University of Calgary.

== Collaborating agencies ==
Collaborating agencies include the government-industry research agency Alberta Innovates-Technology Futures (AITF), the University of Alberta, home to the ABMI Executive Office, Science Centre, and Information Centre, Alberta Research Council, home to the ABMI Monitoring Centre. The Alberta Conservation Association (ACA) which "manages fisheries and aquatic sampling in lakes and rivers" and the Royal Alberta Museum which "manages specimen identification and storage."

The Pembina Institute is a member of the Alberta Biodiversity Monitoring Institute (ABMI) – "one of the primary existing programs that the implementation plan endorsed for expansion and more funding." Pembina Institute's Simon Dyer who is also on the board of the ABMI argued that, "There is nothing like [the ABMI] anywhere else in the world, in terms of its comprehensiveness, the number of species it looks at and its ability to monitor changes in biodiversity over large landscapes over long time periods. What the ABMI provides, for the first time, is a meaningful metric of environmental impact or biodiversity performance that governments could use to inform decision making." According to Dyer, in pristine northeastern Alberta "there is still time to do proper land use planning, identify conservation areas for biodiversity and ensure good planning going forward." Dyer explains that the projected quadrupling of oil sands production "without a proper plan in place to mitigate those impacts" is what concerns oil sands critics, not the current impacts. According to the Pembina Institute blog, "The ABMI is identified as a key component of the Joint Canada-Alberta Monitoring Plan and has many strong elements – scientific leadership, publicly accessible information, and value-neutral result presentation. However, the ABMI still has not secured full funding, so the ABMI's ability to deliver sound monitoring data is limited by the availability of resources to support its work."

== Joint Canada-Alberta Monitoring Plan ==
In February 2012 Canada's Environment Minister, Peter Kent announced the launch of the Joint Canada-Alberta Monitoring Plan or Joint Canada-Alberta Implementation Plan for Oil Sands Monitoring, with aspirations of becoming a transparent, accountable world class oil sands environmental monitoring system. The Alberta Biodiversity Monitoring Institute (ABMI) is the key component of the Joint Canada-Alberta Monitoring Plan.

== Methodologies ==
The ABMI and the Alberta Forest Management Planning Standard are based on the cumulative approach and ecosystem management principles.

The basic survey design consists of 1656 sites, 20 km apart, evenly spaced on a grid pattern across Alberta. Sites will be sampled over a five-year period at a rate of 350 sites/year. Standardized sampling protocols will be used to cover a broad range of species and habitat elements within terrestrial and aquatic environments, as well as broader landscape-level features.

— Stadt, Schieck, Stelfox 2006

According to Cathy Olesen MP,

The biodiversity and, therefore, the health of over 2,000 species is assessed by the changes in habitats and human land use through a cumulative effects approach. Cumulative effects monitoring attempts to uncover the link between environmental stressors and the many indicators that are monitored. The methodology employed is such that the province is divided into 1,656 evenly spaced monitoring areas. Each year approximately 330 sites are assessed. An assessment is comprised of site visits, aerial photography, and satellite imagery. This results in a comprehensive snapshot of the entire province every five years. The next time around when a site gets re-examined, it is done within a week's window to reduce any seasonal variability.

— Cathy Olesen MP

Researchers from ABMI and the University of Alberta using the oil sands industry of Alberta as case study in their paper in which they challenged the economic prudence of the costly equivalency-based biodiversity offset systems by using ABMI's "empirically derived index of biodiversity intactness to link offsets with losses incurred by development."

Biodiversity offsets are designed to compensate for residual environmental damage caused by development after avoidance, minimization, and mitigation of environmental impacts have been considered and implemented. The goal of offsets is to compensate for the loss of biodiversity at one location with conservation gains elsewhere. Typical forms of biodiversity offsets include land protection, restoration, or enhancement, and they are typically applied to achieve no net loss of a particular biodiversity feature.

— Habib et al 2013

== Boreal woodland caribou ==
According to the 2014 ABMI report all six herds of caribou including the threatened boreal and the endangered mountain caribou "have suffered annual rates of decline ranging from 4.6% to 15.2% from 1993 to 2012" in the oil sands region (OSR) as oil and gas production booms in northern Alberta. As these herds in the oil-sands region are "genetically distinct" from other boreal caribou populations, the ABMI report concludes that, "It is therefore unlikely that populations in the (region) will gain new members from caribou populations in other parts of the province." In an article in The Wall Street Journal, Dawson observed that, "The report comes amid controversy over Alberta's recent sales of oil and gas development leases in areas populated by both boreal and mountain caribou."
