= Leopold Report =

1964 report on wildlife management in US National Parks

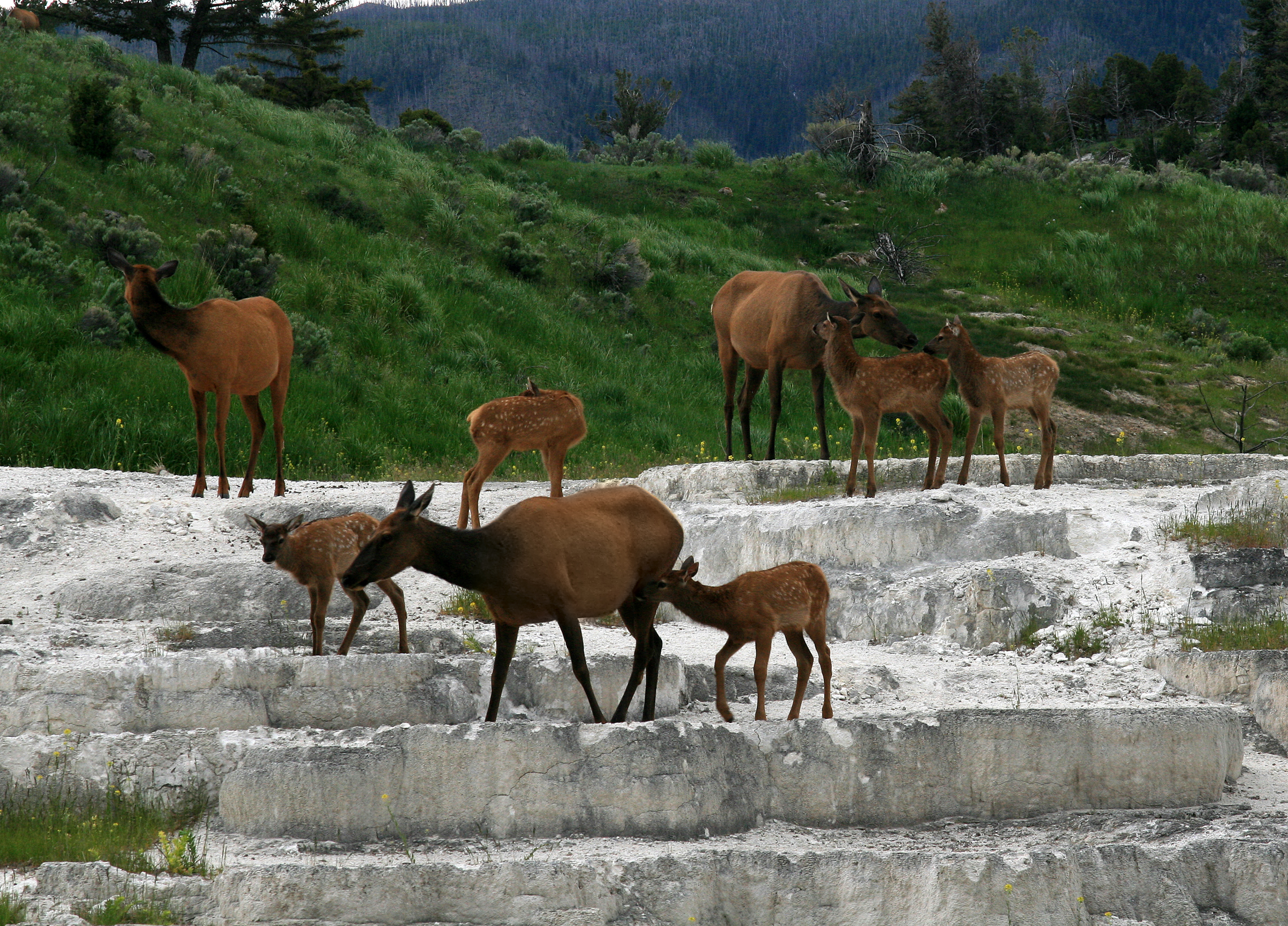
Elk at the Opal Terrace at Mammoth Hot Springs, Yellowstone National Park

The Leopold Report, officially known as Wildlife Management in the National Parks, is a 1963 paper composed of a series of ecosystem management recommendations that were presented by the Special Advisory Board on Wildlife Management to United States Secretary of the Interior Stewart Udall. Named for its chairman and principal author, zoologist and conservationist A. Starker Leopold, the report proved influential for future preservation mandates.

After several years of public controversy regarding the forced reduction of the elk population in Yellowstone National Park, Udall appointed an advisory board to collect scientific data to inform future wildlife management of the national parks. The committee observed that culling programs at other national parks had been ineffective, and recommended different management of Yellowstone's elk population. In addressing the goals, policies, and methods of managing wildlife in the parks, the report suggested that in addition to protection, wildlife populations should be managed and regulated to prevent habitat degradation. Touching upon predator control, fire ecology, and other issues, the report suggested that the National Park Service (NPS) hire scientists to manage the parks using current scientific research.

The Leopold Report became the first concrete plan to manage park visitors and ecosystems under unified principles. It was reprinted in several national publications, and many of its recommendations were incorporated into the official policies of the NPS. Although the report is notable for proposing that park management have a fundamental goal of reflecting "the primitive scene ... a reasonable illusion of primitive America", some have criticized it for its idealism and limited scope.

== Background ==
Logo of the United States National Park Service

Yellowstone National Park was established by the United States Congress on March 1, 1872, as the first U.S. national park, and quickly became a popular tourist destination. At first, national parks were overseen by a variety of agencies and lacked bureaucratic support. In 1916, more than four decades after Yellowstone's founding, President Woodrow Wilson signed a bill creating the National Park Service (NPS), giving it the power "to conserve the scenery and the natural and historic objects and wildlife therein, and to provide for the enjoyment of the same in such manner and by such means as will leave them unimpaired for the enjoyment of future generations." The NPS was tasked with both preservation and tourism, two divergent goals that would prove divisive during the resurgence of the conservation movement in the 1940s and 1950s.

NPS managers became interested in attracting more tourists to Yellowstone during the 1910s and 1920s. Species such as elk and antelope were considered a major attraction for park visitors, and an attempt was made to increase their numbers through winter feeding and predator control. The effort was successful, and the number of elk expanded significantly, but to the detriment of other wildlife such as bighorn sheep. Despite sporadic reductions of elk by hunters, the animals still posed a problem to the northern range ecosystems, mainly because of overgrazing. In the winter of 1961, park rangers responded to this dilemma by shooting and killing approximately 4,300 elk. This aggressive reduction by the Park Service caused a massive public outcry; network television and newspaper coverage of the culling resulted in public opposition and congressional hearings. The International Association of Game and Fish Commissioners protested the "slaughtering of elk by hired killers" rather than by sportsmen, and schoolchildren from across the country were inspired to write letters of condemnation. Facing public backlash, the NPS announced it would stop killing elk.

== Advisory board and reporting ==
The controversy surrounding the reduction of elk in Yellowstone shed a negative light upon the NPS and their management of wildlife populations within the country's national parks. In response to what was deemed a "crisis in public relations", Secretary of the Interior Stewart Udall assembled the Special Advisory Board on Wildlife Management in 1962 to conduct thorough studies to be conducted on its science and resource management. The purpose of the board was to collect scientific data and investigate the necessity of wildlife population control. Chairing the board was A. Starker Leopold, the eldest son of noted conservationist Aldo Leopold. A respected zoologist, professor of ecology, and assistant to the chancellor at the University of California, Berkeley, Leopold was joined on the board by other prominent scientists and conservationists: Professor Stanley A. Cain of the Department of Conservation at the University of Michigan; Ira N. Gabrielson, formerly of the U.S. Fish and Wildlife Service (FWS) and president of the Wildlife Management Institute; Thomas L. Kimball, executive director of the National Wildlife Federation; and Clarence Cottam, former assistant director of the FWS and director of the Welder Wildlife Foundation.

The formation of the advisory board was historically important, as this was the first time an outside group was asked to evaluate wildlife programs within the NPS. The report was officially named "Wildlife Management in the National Parks" when it was first presented on March 4, 1963, but it became informally known as the "Leopold Report". At the same time, a separate advisory board was formed by the National Academy of Sciences (NAS) to produce "A Report by the advisory committee to the National Park Service on Research". The NAS Report, more commonly known as the Robbins Report, was named after its primary author, biologist William J. Robbins. The Robbins Report was released on August 1, 1963, five months after the Leopold Report.

== Recommendations ==
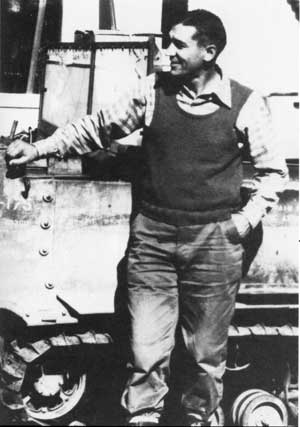
The Leopold Report was primarily written and prepared by zoologist and conservationist A. Starker Leopold.

The report began by arguing that not only was it necessary to control the elk population in Yellowstone National Park, but direct reduction of elk was presented as the most suitable option. According to scientific findings, reduction programs at other national parks had not been implemented on a large enough scale; as a result, the advisory board recommended future reductions of animals should "be larger and in many cases repeated annually". The report also supported the concept of carrying capacity, and the idea that the elk population could be actively managed to restore its natural balance.

Although the advisory board recommendations focused on wildlife and habitat management, they also touched upon the recreation of primitive, uncontrolled conditions. Revisiting fire ecology and the importance of fire, which had long been suppressed in national parks and other federal lands, the report recommended the use of prescribed fire as a cheap and natural tool for shaping the park environment.

Predator control was also reviewed, and deemed unnatural and unpopular. Recreational hunting was strongly opposed, but the report allowed for select members of the public to assist in the "sole purpose of animal removal". The main goal of the NPS, the report explained, was to preserve national parks primarily for the "aesthetic, spiritual, scientific and educational values they offered to the public".

The report strayed from arguments based on scientific data and veered into environmental philosophy, concluding that national parks should serve a historical purpose. One of the most popular passages in the report is from the section "The Goal of Park Management in the United States"; here, the report alludes to recreating an unaltered landscape, a sentiment touching upon a national park ideal: "As a primary goal, we would recommend that the biotic associations within each park be maintained, or where necessary recreated, as nearly as possible in the condition that prevailed when the area was first visited by the white man. A national park should represent a vignette of primitive America." It continues:

Restoring the primitive scene is not done easily nor can it be done completely. Some species are extinct. Given time, an eastern hardwood forest can be regrown to maturity but the chestnut will be missing and so will the roar of pigeon wings. The colorful drapanid finches are not to be heard again in the lowland forests of Hawaii, nor will the jack-hammer of the ivory-bill ring in southern swamps. The wolf and grizzly bear cannot readily be reintroduced into ranching communities, and the factor of human use of the parks is subject only to regulation, not elimination. Exotic plants, animals, and diseases are here to stay. All these limitations we fully realize. Yet, if the goal cannot be fully achieved it can be approached. A reasonable illusion of primitive America could be recreated, using the utmost in skill, judgment, and ecologic sensitivity. This in our opinion should be the objective of every national park and monument.

Most importantly, the Leopold Report emphasized the need for scientific research and ecological management expertise in the national parks. Acknowledging the harm caused to nature by humans, the advisory board asked for the implementation of "a set of ecologic skills unknown in this country today". A call to arms was raised for exploring new methods of active protection and restoration of plant and animal life in the national parks: "Americans have shown a great capacity for degrading and fragmenting native biotas. So far we have not exercised much imagination or ingenuity in rebuilding damaged biotas. It will not be done by passive protection alone."

== Reception and publication ==
The report was first presented on March 4, 1963, and originally published in the Transactions of the Twenty-Eighth North American Wildlife and Natural Resources Conference. Conrad L. Wirth, director of the NPS from 1951 to 1964, stated that the report reworded the Service's 1916 mandate into "modern language", using a scientific perspective to redefine the basic purpose of national parks. Secretary Udall supported the report and instructed the NPS to incorporate the findings into the agency's operations. In a memorandum dated May 2, 1963, he reiterated the purpose of the national park in the scope of the Leopold Report: "... a primary goal of park management is to maintain the biotic associations within each park as nearly as possible in that relationship which existed at a predetermined time period. The goal then is to create or maintain the mood of wild America."

The advisory board was reconstituted in part as a permanent Natural Sciences Advisory Board to the NPS. In 1964, Wirth's successor, George B. Hartzog Jr., established the Division of Natural Science Studies, naming biologist George Sprugel Jr. the Service's chief scientist. The memorable idea of a "vignette of primitive America" drew popular attention from readers and the report received widespread publicity and praise amongst conservationists. It was reprinted in several national publications and was also noted in the Sierra Club Bulletin. Leopold often said that had he known the report would be widely read and dissected, he probably would have written it more carefully.

== Legacy ==
The Leopold Report was the first concrete plan for managing park visitors and ecosystems under unified principles. With an infusion of scientists and resource programs, it set into motion a series of ecologically positive legislative actions in the 1960s and into the 1970s. While direct management of the elk population in Yellowstone National Park continues to spark debate amongst scientists, the report nonetheless successfully influenced multiple areas of park management. Prior to the report's publication, California's Sequoia National Park was beset by a thick underbrush, which the report directly referred to as a "dog-hair thicket ... a direct function of overprotection from natural ground fires". This underbrush would have been naturally eradicated by lightning storms, but because of policies that supported wildfire suppression, the growth threatened the park's Giant Sequoia trees. As a direct result of the report's advice regarding the usefulness of controlled burning, in 1964 the park began performing trial controlled burns, which led to a 1968 policy championing the continuation of burns for the betterment of the park's forest ecosystems. Fire ecologist Bruce Kilgore credited the Leopold Report as being a true catalyst for change, stating that it was the "document of greatest significance to National Park Service [fire] policy".

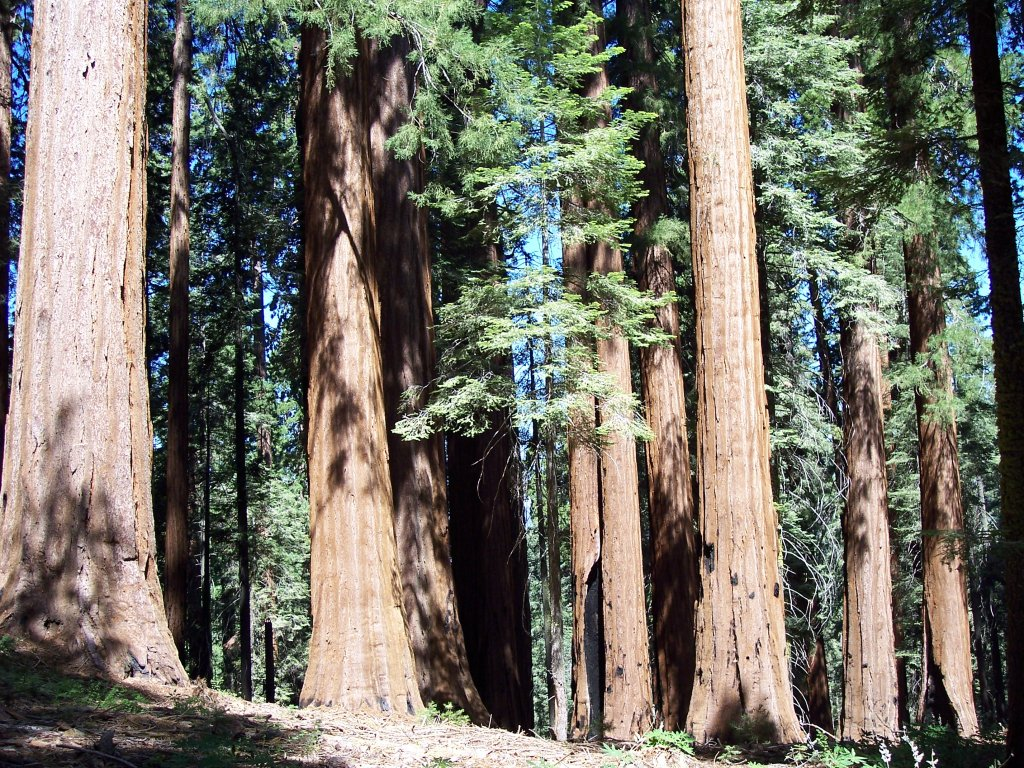
Giant Sequoia trees in the Giant Forest, Sequoia National Park

Although the Robbins Report did not receive the same recognition as the Leopold Report, it reached similar conclusions. However, unlike the Leopold Report, the Robbins Report criticized the NPS for its lack of scientific research and made recommendations for sweeping changes in the structure of the NPS, with a proposal for a strong focus on a science-based approach. In 1972, the far more detailed Cain Report was released; amounting to 207 pages in comparison to the Leopold Report's scant 28, its committee was chaired by Stanley A. Cain, who also worked on the Leopold Report. Although this report made similar recommendations to the one primarily written by Leopold, it stated that little had been done to advance the previous report's findings, especially in terms of predator control. As a result of the Cain Report's recommendations, President Richard Nixon signed Executive Order 11643, which restricted the usage of poisons such as strychnine and sodium cyanide for predator control.

The report's visionary goal for preservation has been both lauded and criticized. Author of the book Searching for Yellowstone: Ecology and Wonder in the Last Wilderness, Paul Schullery, wrote of the report: "Scholars return to it for new interpretations and even inspiration regularly, speakers invoke it on all occasions, and it is trotted out to prove almost every perspective in debates about modern park management." On the other hand, Alston Chase, a vocal critic of the National Park Service, disapproved of the limited scope of the Leopold Report, arguing that it had "inadvertently replaced science with nostalgia, subverting the goal it had set out to support". The report's insistence to return parks to the condition that "prevailed when the area was first visited by the white man" has also been criticized for ignoring the Native Americans' historical presence in the area. Historian and author Philip Burnham in particular stated in his 2000 book, Indian Country, God's Country: Native Americans and the National Parks, that although Leopold et al. were more progressive than their predecessors, they "still dismissed native people as passive onlookers".
