= Mary Eleanor Power =

American ecologist

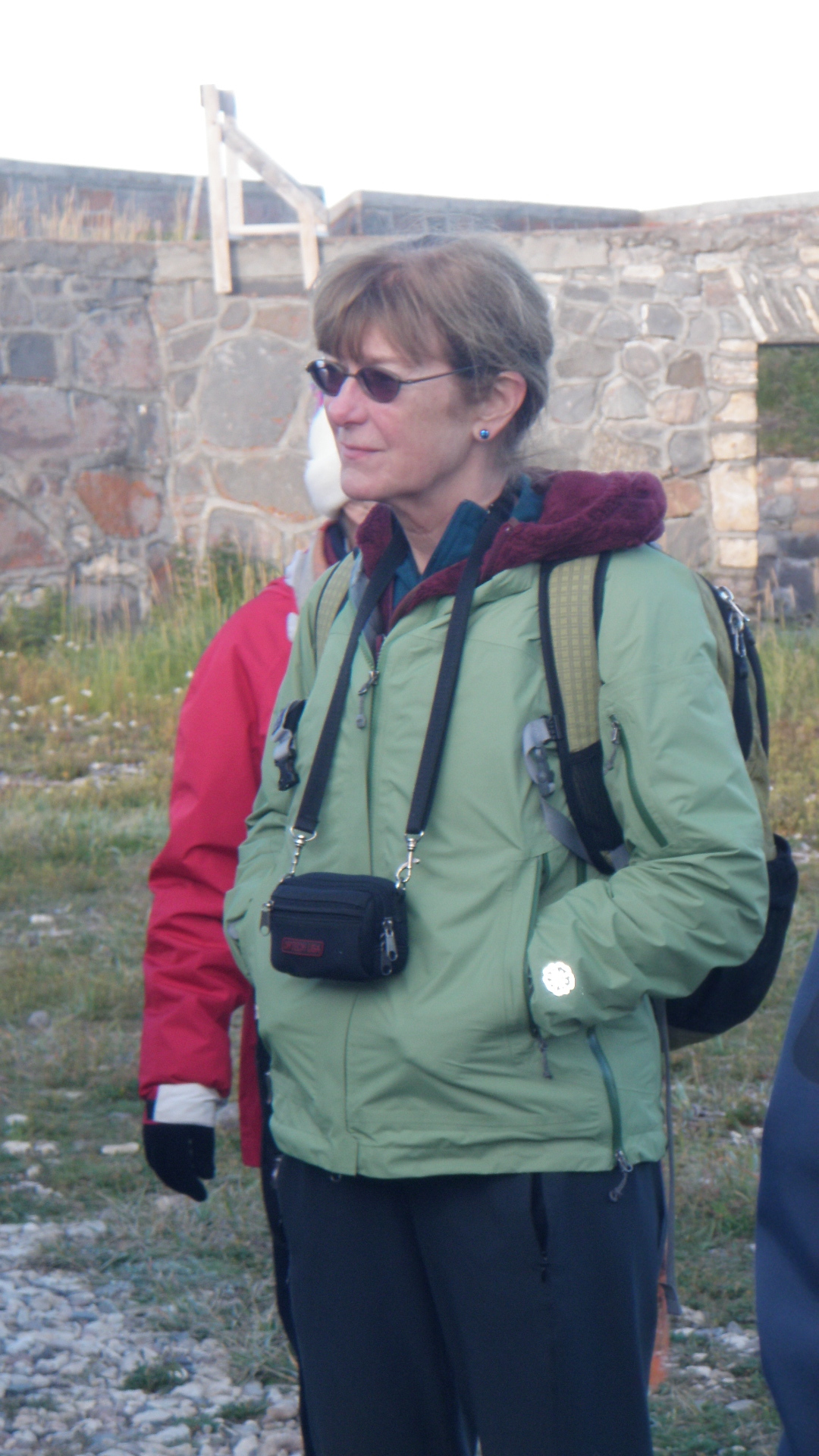
- Power at Fort Churchill, Manitoba (August 2011)
- Born: August 22, 1949 (age 76)
- Citizenship: US Citizen
- Education: University of Washington (Ph.D); Boston University Marine Program at Woods Hole, Massachusetts (M.S.); Brown University (B.A)
- Spouse: William Dietrich
- Awards: Member, National Academy of Sciences (Elected 2012); Honorary doctorate from Umeå University, Sweden (2011); Fellow, American Academy of Arts and Sciences (elected 2007); Fellow, California Academy of Sciences (elected 2005); G. Evelyn Hutchinson Medal, American Society of Limnology and Oceanography (2005); Kempe Award for Distinguished Ecologists (2004); John and Margaret Gompertz Chair in Integrative Biology (2002-2007)
- Scientific career
- Fields: Ecology: food webs
- Thesis: The grazing ecology of armored catfish in a Panamanian stream

Mary Eleanor Power is Professor of the Graduate School in the Department of Integrative Biology at the University of California, Berkeley. Power is a member of the U.S. National Academy of Sciences, the American Academy of Arts and Sciences, and the California Academy of Sciences. She holds an honorary doctorate from Umeå University, Sweden, and is a recipient of the G. Evelyn Hutchinson Award of the Association for the Sciences of Limnology and Oceanography (formerly known as the American Society of Limnology and Oceanography (2005)), and the Kempe Award for Distinguished Ecologists (2004).

Power is a past president of the Ecological Society of America (2009–10) and the American Society of Naturalists (2005–2006).

Power and her work are featured prominently in the documentary film, The Serengeti Rules, which was released in 2018.

== Biography ==
Power earned her Ph.D. in zoology from the University of Washington in 1981 and has been professor in the Department of Integrative Biology at the University of California Berkeley since 1987. She has also been the Faculty Director of the Angelo Coast Range Reserve in Mendocino County since 1989.

== Professional work ==
Power's research on river food web ecology, community and landscape ecology has influenced theory on the importance of species interaction in food webs and of food webs in ecosystem functioning. Her long-term research has examined how species influence changes in food webs, how energy flows among ecosystems, and how species interactions vary in different environmental regimes, with relevance to Biogeomorphology and food web alterations.

Power's study of armored catfish was an early (1981) demonstration that ideal free distribution could be achieved by foragers in the wild. Power has studied river food webs in Panama, Oklahoma priaries, the Ozarks, and the Eel River of northwestern California.

== Major publications ==
- Power, M.E., D. Tilman, J. A. Estes, B.A. Menge, W.J. Bond, L.S. Mills, G. Daily, J.C. Castilla, J. Lubchenco, and R.T. Paine. 1996. Challenges in the quest for keystones. BioScience 46: 609–620.
- Power, M. E. 1992. Top-down and bottom-up forces in food webs: do plants have primacy? Ecology 73: 733–746.
- Power, M. E. 1990. Effects of fish in river food webs. Science 250: 811–814.
