= Ouzel Fire =

1978 fire in Rocky Mountain National Park

On August 9, 1978, a lightning strike near Ouzel Lake in Rocky Mountain National Park sparked the Ouzel Fire. The Ouzel Fire of 1978 tested the strength and support of the new controlled burning policies, as well as paved the way for future changes in fire management. The fire initially simmered on the ground for weeks with the occasional tree burning. However, in mid-September, the Chinook winds picked up and caused the fire to drastically spread, covering over 1000 acres. The winds carried the fire in a specific direction, five miles in length but less than half a mile wide. Soon, the fire approached Allenspark, threatening the town and homes in the surrounding area. Residents evacuated, but no harm came to their homes. At this point, the fire stations signaled the alarms to begin fighting the fire. The fire continued to blaze for a time, and officials speculated that nature might halt what it had created through humidity, rain, or snow. On Monday, September 16, 1978, 3–4 feet of new snow rested just 2000 feet above where the fire was blazing. Although the snow helped the 500 firefighters in their battle, they were still unable to put out the fire. Topography was what saved the town: a small ridge drove the wind upwards and halted the fire on the outskirts of the town. Through a months-long battle, the fire was finally declared out on December 4, 1978. The threat that this fire imposed on surrounding communities and the rate at which it exponentially increased in size convinced the public that the new natural burning policy was misguided. Complete fire suppression had been the main policy of wildfire control since the founding of the Forest Service in the early 1900s. These policies changed in the mid-1970s, and the Ouzel Fire, among others, were crucial in determining the success of the new policies. A Louisville Times article published in February 1979, a couple of months after the fire was finally put out, described the "deficiencies" in the new fire program, specifically, disregard for air quality, residential development, urban interferences, and pre-existing fire conditions. This fire was the first of the natural fires to actually threaten a community, which led to the perception that the new policy was irresponsible and dangerous. This doubt in the new Federal Policy caused scientists to look into what went wrong with the Ouzel Fire. They came to conclusions similar to what the Louisville Times article stated: plans were not fully thought out, landscape and topography of the Rocky Mountain National Park was not fully considered, and fire conditions were ignored. Since the Ouzel Fire ravaged through Rocky Mountain National Park, the federal government has revised the prescribed and natural burning policies to prevent another mishap that threatens surrounding communities. The 2000 National Fire Plan forced controlled burning plans to implement a three step checklist considering weather conditions, nearby resources, and homes: the three factors that were ignored when initially managing the Ouzel fire. The abundance of residential areas in the United States makes implementing this policy difficult, as many fires often threaten some sort of surrounding community. However, since the Ouzel Fire, Rocky Mountain National Park has burned 7 times between 1978 and 2005. Therefore, despite the protest of controlled burnings after the Ouzel Fire grew out of control, prescribed burns still remained a main policy for wildfire management. The Ouzel Fire of 1978 was one of the first major wildfires after the implementation of prescribed burning as the main fire management policy and because of the way the fire acted, new stricter policies were enacted.
