= A. Starker Leopold =

American author, forester, zoologist and conservationist

- Born: Aldo Starker Leopold; October 23, 1913; Burlington, Iowa
- Died: August 23, 1983 (aged 69); Berkeley, California
- Education: University of Wisconsin (BS), University of California, Berkeley (PhD)
- Scientific career
- Fields: Forestry, Ornithology
- Workplaces: University of California, Berkeley
- Doctoral advisor: Alden Miller
- Other academic advisors: Joseph Grinnell
- Doctoral students: Ralph Raitt

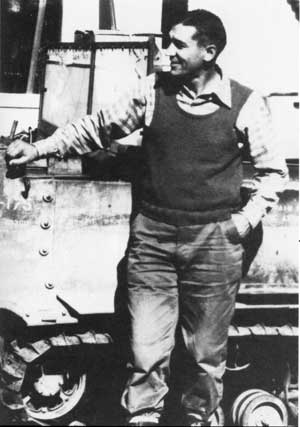
A. Starker Leopold known for his conservation efforts and contribution to wilderness areas.

Aldo Starker Leopold (October 22, 1913 – August 23, 1983) was an American author, forester, zoologist and conservationist. Leopold served as a professor at the University of California, Berkeley, for thirty years within the Zoology, Conservation, and Forestry departments. Throughout his life, Leopold was a public face for science. He was active in numerous wildlife and conservation groups and made significant research contributions in ornithology, mammalogy, and wildlife ecology. Leopold is notable for his ecosystem management paper, the Leopold Report, and his considerable presence in some of the most controversial wildlife issues, including national park wildlife policy, predator control, wildlife refuge, and fire policy.

== Personal life and death ==
Born in Burlington, Iowa, on October 22, 1913, A. Starker Leopold was the oldest son of noted conservationist Aldo Leopold and Estella Bergere Leopold. His siblings—Luna, Carl, Estella, and Nina—also contributed significantly to the conservation movement. As a result of his father's employment by the United States Forest Service, Starker spent his early childhood in Albuquerque, New Mexico. When Starker was eleven years old, the Leopold family moved to Madison, Wisconsin, as his father took a faculty position at the University of Wisconsin in 1924.

As Starker spent his early boyhood fishing on the Rio Grande River and hunting in the oak and prairie country of Madison, Wisconsin, he learned to feel secure in nature from a young age. It is clear that Starker's passion for nature was instilled during his childhood, spent with his distinguished father. Another critical experience that developed Starker's mindset and opinions on nature was a guided hunting trip in northern Mexico’s Sierra Madre mountain system with his brother Carl and father Aldo in the winter of 1937 - 1938. Starker experienced an ecosystem untouched by humans, with all its processes intact, which allowed him to gain insight into the beneficial and essential roles predators and frequent low-burning fire play in wilderness landscapes.

In 1938, he married Elizabeth Weiskotten when both were students at the University of California, Berkeley; the couple had two children—Fredric S., born in 1941, and Sarah Leopold, born in 1948. In August 1983 A. Starker Leopold, died due to a heart attack in his Berkeley home. He was survived by his wife, two children, and three grandchildren.

== Education ==
He received his B.S. from the University of Wisconsin in 1936, and then studied at the Yale Forestry School before transferring to the University of California, Berkeley, where he received his Ph.D. in Zoology in 1944. With the help of professors, Joseph Grinnell and Alden H. Miller, and his specific interest in ornithology, he completed his dissertation research on the nature of heritable wildness in turkeys. The findings in his research are credited as a major contribution to the understanding of wild avian biology and behavior. During his education, he worked as a junior biologist with the U.S. Soil Erosion Service from 1934 - 1935 and as a field biologist for the Missouri Conservation Commission from 1939 - 1944. After receiving his Ph.D., he worked in Mexico for the Conservation Section of the Pan-American Union as Director of Field Research from 1944 - 1946.

== Career at Berkeley ==
After working in Mexico for the Conservation Section of the Pan-American Union, Leopold returned to the University of California, Berkeley, in 1946 as Assistant Professor of Zoology and Conservation in the Museum of Vertebrate Zoology. He was promoted to Associate Professor in 1952 and then Professor in 1957. Starker was an accomplished, enlightening teacher who was easy going which had earned him admiration from his students. In 1958, he was appointed Associate Director of the Museum of Vertebrate Zoology and became the acting Director of the Museum after the death of Alden H. Miller in 1965. He was Assistant to the Berkeley Chancellor for three years (from 1960–1963). In early 1967, he changed his affiliation to the School of Forestry and Conservation, where he was professor of Zoology and Forestry until his retirement as Professor Emeritus in 1978. Additional positions at Berkeley included serving as the Director of the Sagehen Creek Field Station from 1965 to 1979.

== Conservation and authorship ==
In 1962, A. Starker Leopold began his role in advisory work for the National Park Service as he was appointed as chairman of the Special Advisory Board on Wildlife Management by Secretary of the Interior Stewart Udall, who was in search of recommendations over the debate of reduction methods of elk in Yellowstone. Leopold retained this association until his death twenty years later. Being an expert on population irruption, ecosystems, and hunting, Leopold understood that implementing management methods in National Parks was required to approach this issue. In response, Leopold and the Advisory Board published Wildlife Management in National Parks, better known as the Leopold Report, in 1963. Many of the ideas in the Leopold Report reaffirmed those promoted in the 1930s by Joseph Grinnell and his students George Wright and Joseph Dixon, who asserted that management practices must be implemented to preserve the park's original state. While Wright and his students' ideas had little influence during the 1930s, the Leopold Report greatly impacted public policy within the National Park Service due to the ideas being presented in the environmentally conscious 1960s. This series of additional ideas and recommendations was groundbreaking for the National Park Service as it was the first ambition to manage parks' visitors and ecology together. The main concepts of the report surrounded the goals, policies, and methods of wildlife management in national parks. It was recommended that the current method of wildlife protection alone was unsatisfactory and that the goal of the parks should be to preserve or, where necessary, recreate habitats that support native species, along with the regulation of animal populations to prevent habitat damage.

In 1964, the Advisory Board and Leopold scrutinized the United States Fish and Wildlife Service's Branch of Predatory and Rodent Control for excessive killing of animals that have not caused damage or danger to the public. This report is considered one of the most critical and intense assessments of a United States federal agency regarding the responsibility of animal control.

The final evaluation completed by Leopold and the Board was on the National Refuge System's evaluation of the importance of national refuges in migratory bird conservation. The recommendation included increasing the number of refuges, increasing financial support for existing refuges, and using these refuges for research and ecology education. The concepts of the Leopold Report not only applied to managing wildlife in order to protect the natural ecosystem but also to predator control, controlled use of fire, and the inclusion of scientific research in decision-making.

Starkers' advisor role for the National Park Service continued when he chaired a 1969 meeting of the Natural Sciences Advisory Committee to discuss grizzly bear management at Yellowstone. The meeting was held to question the bear management program implemented to reduce the number of bear-caused human injuries, property damage, and fatal attacks related to bears' access to human food and garbage sources by removing troublesome bears.

In addition to the more than 100 scientific papers he authored, Leopold wrote five books during his life, he was working on a sixth at the time of his death. While his writings were not at the forefront in the scientific community, his later works started to focus less on research and more on developing public policy. Leopold took ideas in the scientific community and launched them into political arena, forming many policies that still stand today.

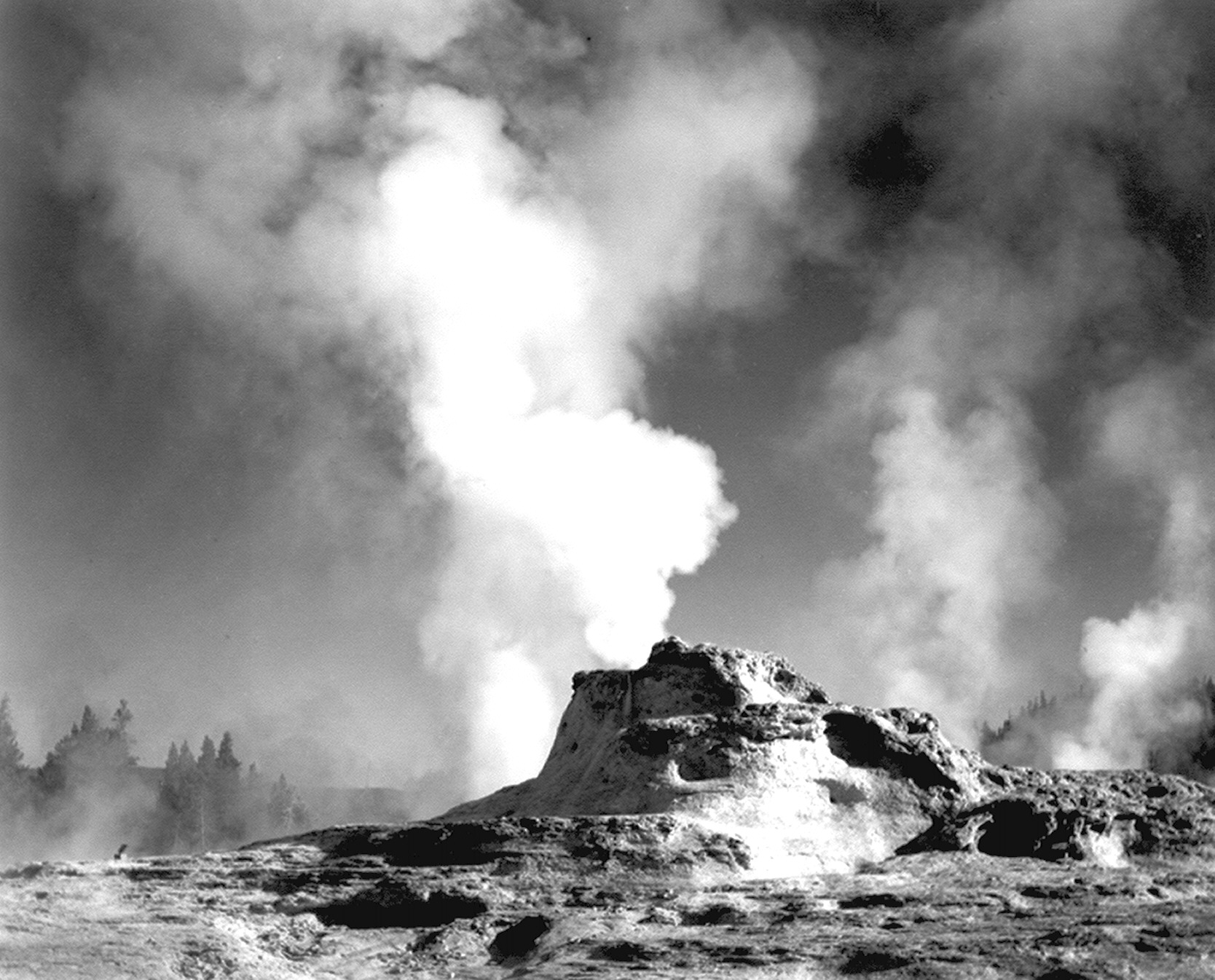
A geyser in Yellowstone National Park, Where Leopold did substantial work

== Professional and public service ==
Leopold was also an active member of numerous conservation committees and organizations, including

- Advisory Board on National Parks (1977 - 1978)
- Marine Mammal Commission, appointed by the President (1972 - 1975)
- Board of Ecology Team Consultant for U.S. Plywood Champion Papers, Inc (1970)
- Consultant on Research Policy, Tanzania National Parks (1970)
- Chairman, Committee to Appraise the Program of the Missouri Conservation Commission (1969 - 1970)
- Advisory Committee, Lawrence Hall of Science (1969)
- Chief Scientist and Chairman, Advisory Committee, National Park Service (1968 - 1972)
- Knapp Professorship, University of Wisconsin (1968)
- Board of Advisors, National Wildlife Federation (1967 - 1983)
- Consultant, California Water Quality Control Board (1965 - 1969)
- President, Board of Governors, Cooper Ornithological Society (1964)
- Advisory Trustee, Alta Bates Hospital Association (1964)
- Chairman, Wildlife Management Advisory Committee, appointed by Secretary of the Interior Stewart L. Udall (1962 - 1968)
- President, Northern Division, Cooper Ornithological Society (1960)
- President, California Academy of Sciences (1959 - 1966)
- President, Wildlife Society (1957 - 1958)
- Member of Science Council and Board of Trustees, California Academy of Sciences (1956 - 1983)
- Vice President and Member of the Board of Directors, Sierra Club (1955 - 1960)
- Editorial Board, Sierra Club Bulletin (1955 - 1959)
- Council Member, Wilderness Society (1954 - 1957)
- Board of Governors, Nature Conservancy (1954 - 1956)
- Editorial Board, Pacific Discovery (1948 - 1966)
- American Ornithological Society, Member (1940); Elective Member (1946); Fellow (1959)

== Books ==
In addition to the more than 100 scientific papers he authored, Leopold authored five books during his life and was working on a sixth at the time of his death.

- Wildlife in Alaska (with F. F. Darling) (1953)
  - In 1952, Starker Leopold teamed up with ecologist F. Fraser Darling to complete an ecological reconnaissance of Alaska, surveying the current and potential impact of economic growth and technology on the territory's natural resources. With a focus on big game, the team spent four months traveling, observing, and conducting interviews to understand the state and its natural resources. Sponsored by the New York Zoological Society and the Conservation Foundation, their research resulted in the publication of Wildlife in Alaska in 1953.
- Wildlife of Mexico: The Game Birds and Mammals (1959)
  - Leopold began his fieldwork in 1944, with fifty-one camp study sites extending from the northern Sonoran Desert border to the Yucatan Peninsula. His fluency in Spanish aided him in receiving official sanction from Mexican officials and guidance from landowners and farmers. Published in 1959, Wildlife of Mexico: The Game Birds and Mammals won the Wildlife Society Publication of the Year Award.
- The Desert (1961; Revised 1962; Series: LIFE Nature Library)
  - The Desert, published in 1961 for Time-Life’s Life Nature Library series, Starker traced desert geographic features made by wind and water and the ecology of plants, animals, and humans living in arid environments.
- The California Quail (1977)
  - This guide contains suggestions for managing western quails based on insight into the species' ecology and life history. California Quail, a wildlife ecology publication, won the Wildlife Society Publication Award in 1979.
- North American Game Birds and Mammals (1982) (with R. Gutierrez and M. Bronson)
  - In 1981, Leopold published his final book, a collaboration with ecologists Ralph J. Gutierrez and Michael T. Bronson. North American Game Birds and Mammals is an encyclopedia assessment of 135 US, Canada, and northern Mexico game species.
- Wild California: Vanishing Lands, Vanishing Wildlife, (posthumous, with Elizabeth Leopold), photographs by Tupper Ansel Blake. University of California Press/The Nature Conservancy, (1987)
  - Wild California, the sixth book Leopold was writing before his death, was published in 1987 to make a persuasive argument for identifying and protecting the different ecosystems of California.

== Legacy ==
Ecologists and wildlife biologists universally credit Starker Leopold with enhancing the credibility of science through his life's work in conservation, wildlife management, and education. His research and authorship, as seen in the use of the Leopold Report, profoundly shaped the current views of the role of human presence in the management of nature. Leopold persuaded the National Park Service to embrace science as a tool to set scientifically informed goals, which was seen in the Park Services' establishment of an office of scientists in 1967 and incorporation of the Leopold Report into the first National Park Service policy manuals in 1968, which provides park managers with a decision-making framework to justify decisions that favor nature over development. This ideology is still currently used as part of the National Park Service's mission of supplying rigorous and timely scientific information to park managers to continue the preservation of parks for future generations.

== Honors and distinctions ==
A. Starker Leopold was a recipient of multiple honors and distinctions throughout his successful career, including

- Guggenheim Fellow (1947) (Field of Study: Organismic Biology & Ecology)
- Fellow, American Ornithologists' Union (1959)
- Department of Interior Conservation Award (1964)
- Aldo Leopold Medal of The Wildlife Society for "Service to Wildlife Conservation" (1965)
- Audubon Society Medal (1966)
- Honorary Member, the Wildlife Society (1969)
- Election to the National Academy of Sciences (1970)
- California Academy of Sciences Fellows Medal (1970)
- Winchester Award for Outstanding Accomplishment in Wildlife Management (1974)
- Berkely Citation, University of California (1978)
- Wildlife Society Publication Award (1979)
- American Institute of Biological Sciences, Distinguished Service Award (1980)
- Occidental College, Honorary Doctoral Degree (1980)
- Edward W. Browning Award for Conserving the Environment, Smithsonian Institution and the New York Community Trust (1980)
