= History of ecology =

Ecology is a new science and considered as an important branch of biological science, having only become prominent during the second half of the 20th century. Ecological thought is derivative of established currents in philosophy, particularly from ethics and politics.

Its history stems all the way back to the 4th century. One of the first ecologists whose writings survive may have been Aristotle or perhaps his student, Theophrastus, both of whom had interest in many species of animals and plants. Theophrastus described interrelationships between animals and their environment as early as the 4th century BC. Ecology developed substantially in the 18th and 19th century. It began with Carl Linnaeus and his work with the economy of nature. Soon after came Alexander von Humboldt and his work with botanical geography. Alexander von Humboldt and Karl Möbius then contributed with the notion of biocoenosis. Eugenius Warming's work with ecological plant geography led to the founding of ecology as a discipline. Charles Darwin's work also contributed to the science of ecology, and Darwin is often attributed with progressing the discipline more than anyone else in its young history. Ecological thought expanded even more in the early 20th century. Major contributions included: Eduard Suess’ and Vladimir Vernadsky's work with the biosphere, Arthur Tansley's ecosystem, Charles Elton's Animal Ecology, and Henry Cowles ecological succession.

Ecology influenced the social sciences and humanities. Human ecology began in the early 20th century and it recognized humans as an ecological factor. Later James Lovelock advanced views on earth as a macro-organism with the Gaia hypothesis. Conservation stemmed from the science of ecology. Important figures and movements include Shelford and the ESA, National Environmental Policy act, George Perkins Marsh, Theodore Roosevelt, Stephen A. Forbes, and post-Dust Bowl conservation. Later in the 20th century world governments collaborated on man’s effects on the biosphere and Earth’s environment.

The history of ecology is intertwined with the history of conservation and restoration efforts.

== 18th and 19th century Ecological murmurs ==
=== Arcadian and Imperial Ecology ===
In the early Eighteenth century, preceding Carl Linnaeus, two rival schools of thought dominated the growing scientific discipline of ecology. First, Gilbert White a "parson-naturalist" is attributed with developing and endorsing the view of Arcadian ecology. Arcadian ecology advocates for a "simple, humble life for man" and a harmonious relationship with humans and nature. Opposing the Arcadian view is Francis Bacon's ideology, "imperial ecology". Imperialists work "to establish through the exercise of reason and by hard work, man’s dominance over nature". Imperial ecologists also believe that man should become a dominant figure over nature and all other organisms as "once enjoyed in the Garden of Eden". Both views continued their rivalry through the early eighteenth century until Carl Linnaeus's support of imperialism; and in short time due to Linnaeus's popularity, imperial ecology became the dominant view within the discipline.

=== Carl Linnaeus and Systema Naturae ===
Carl Linnaeus, a Swedish naturalist, is well known for his work with taxonomy but his ideas helped to lay the groundwork for modern ecology. He developed a two part naming system for classifying plants and animals. Binomial Nomenclature was used to classify, describe, and name different genera and species. The compiled editions of Systema Naturae developed and popularized the naming system for plants and animals in modern biology. Reid suggests "Linnaeus can fairly be regarded as the originator of systematic and ecological studies in biodiversity," due to his naming and classifying of thousands of plant and animal species. Linnaeus also influenced the foundations of Darwinian evolution, he believed that there could be change in or between different species within fixed genera. Linnaeus was also one of the first naturalists to place men in the same category as primates.

=== The botanical geography and Alexander von Humboldt ===
Throughout the 18th and the beginning of the 19th century, the great maritime powers such as Britain, Spain, and Portugal launched many world exploratory expeditions to develop maritime commerce with other countries, and to discover new natural resources, as well as to catalog them. At the beginning of the 18th century, about twenty thousand plant species were known, versus forty thousand at the beginning of the 19th century, and about 300,000 today.

These expeditions were joined by many scientists, including botanists, such as the German explorer Alexander von Humboldt. Humboldt is often considered as father of ecology. He was the first to take on the study of the relationship between organisms and their environment. He exposed the existing relationships between observed plant species and climate, and described vegetation zones using latitude and altitude, a discipline now known as geobotany. Von Humboldt was accompanied on his expedition by the botanist Aimé Bonpland.

In 1856, the Park Grass Experiment was established at the Rothamsted Experimental Station to test the effect of fertilizers and manures on hay yields. This is the longest-running field experiment in the world.

=== The notion of biocoenosis: Wallace and Möbius ===
Alfred Russel Wallace, contemporary and colleague of Darwin, was first to propose a "geography" of animal species. Several authors recognized at the time that species were not independent of each other, and grouped them into plant species, animal species, and later into communities of living beings or biocoenosis. The first use of this term is usually attributed to Karl Möbius in 1877, but already in 1825, the French naturalist Adolphe Dureau de la Malle used the term societé about an assemblage of plant individuals of different species.

=== Warming and the foundation of ecology as discipline ===
While Darwin recognized the role of competition as one among many selective forces, Eugen Warming devised a new discipline that took abiotic factors, that is drought, fire, salt, cold etc., as seriously as biotic factors in the assembly of biotic communities. Biogeography before Warming was largely of descriptive nature – faunistic or floristic. Warming's aim was, through the study of organism (plant) morphology and anatomy, i.e. adaptation, to explain why a species occurred under a certain set of environmental conditions. Moreover, the goal of the new discipline was to explain why species occupying similar habitats, experiencing similar hazards, would solve problems in similar ways, despite often being of widely different phylogenetic descent. Based on his personal observations in Brazilian cerrado, in Denmark, Norwegian Finnmark and Greenland, Warming gave the first university course in ecological plant geography. Based on his lectures, he wrote the book 'Plantesamfund', which was immediate translated to German, Polish and Russian, later to English as 'Oecology of Plants'. Through its German edition, the book had an immense effect on British and North American scientists like Arthur Tansley, Henry Chandler Cowles and Frederic Clements.

=== Malthusian influence ===
Thomas Robert Malthus was an influential writer on the subject of population and population limits in the early 19th century. His works were very important in shaping the ways in which Darwin saw the world worked. Malthus wrote:

That the increase of population is necessarily limited by the means of subsistence,

That population does invariably increase when the means of subsistence increase, and,

That the superior power of population is repressed, and the actual population kept equal to the means of subsistence, by misery and vice.

In An Essay on the Principle of Population Malthus argues for the reining in of rising population through 2 checks: Positive and Preventive checks. The first raising death rates, the later lowers birthing rates. Malthus also brings forth the idea that the world population will move past the sustainable number of people. This form of thought still continues to influences debates on birth and marriage rates to this theory brought forth by Malthus. The essay had a major influence on Charles Darwin and helped him to theories his theory of Natural Selection. This struggle proposed by Malthusian thought not only influenced the ecological work of Charles Darwin, but helped bring about an economic theory of world of ecology.

=== Darwinism and the science of ecology ===
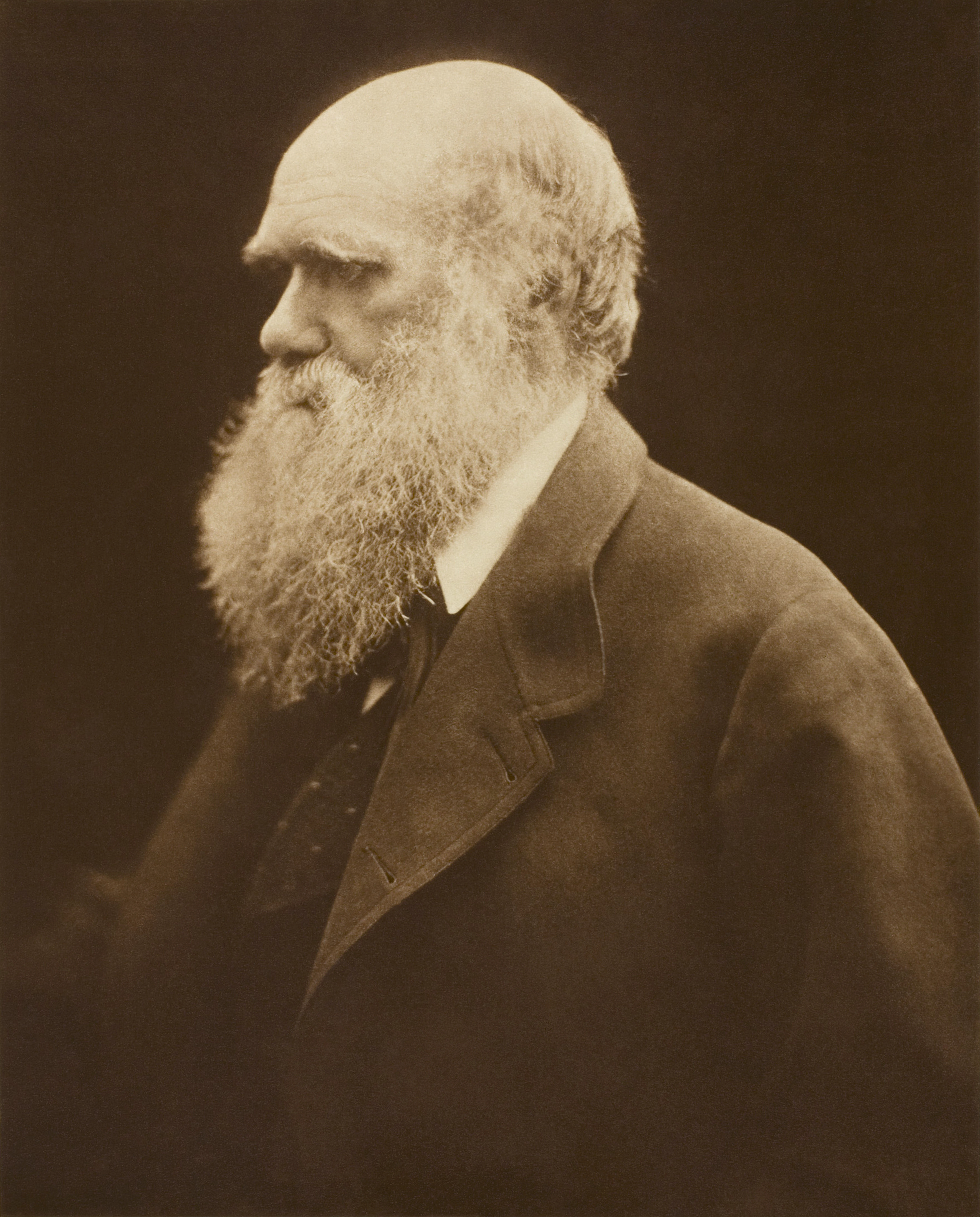
Julia Margaret Cameron's portrait of Darwin

It is often held that the roots of scientific ecology may be traced back to Darwin. This contention may look convincing at first glance inasmuch as On the Origin of Species is full of observations and proposed mechanisms that clearly fit within the boundaries of modern ecology (e.g. the cat-to-clover chain – an ecological cascade) and because the term ecology was coined in 1866 by a strong proponent of Darwinism, Ernst Haeckel. However, Darwin never used the word in his writings after this year, not even in his most "ecological" writings such as the foreword to the English edition of Hermann Müller's The Fertilization of Flowers (1883) or in his own treatise of earthworms and mull formation in forest soils (The formation of vegetable mould through the action of worms, 1881). Moreover, the pioneers founding ecology as a scientific discipline, such as Eugen Warming, A. F. W. Schimper, Gaston Bonnier, F.A. Forel, S.A. Forbes and Karl Möbius, made almost no reference to Darwin's ideas in their works. This was clearly not out of ignorance or because the works of Darwin were not widespread. Some such as S.A.Forbes studying intricate food webs asked questions as yet unanswered about the instability of food chains that might persist if dominant competitors were not adapted to have self-constraint. Others focused on the dominant themes at the beginning, concern with the relationship between organism morphology and physiology on one side and environment on the other, mainly abiotic environment, hence environmental selection. Darwin's concept of natural selection on the other hand focused primarily on competition. The mechanisms other than competition that he described, primarily the divergence of character which can reduce competition and his statement that "struggle" as he used it was metaphorical and thus included environmental selection, were given less emphasis in the Origin than competition. Despite most portrayals of Darwin conveying him as a non-aggressive recluse who let others fight his battles, Darwin remained all his life a man nearly obsessed with the ideas of competition, struggle and conquest – with all forms of human contact as confrontation.

Although there is nothing incorrect in the details presented in the paragraph above, the fact that Darwinism used a particularly ecological view of adaptation and Haeckel's use and definitions of the term were steeped in Darwinism should not be ignored. According to ecologist and historian Robert P. McIntosh, "the relationship of ecology to Darwinian evolution is explicit in the title of the work in which ecology first appeared." A more elaborate definition by Haeckel in 1870 is translated on the frontispiece of the influential ecology text known as 'Great Apes' as "… ecology is the study of all those complex interrelations referred to by Darwin as the conditions of the struggle for existence." The issues brought up in the above paragraph are covered in more detail in the Early Beginnings section underneath that of History in the Wikipedia page on Ecology.

== Early 20th century ~ Expansion of ecological thought ==
=== The biosphere – Eduard Suess and Vladimir Vernadsky ===
By the 19th century, ecology blossomed due to new discoveries in chemistry by Lavoisier and de Saussure, notably the nitrogen cycle. After observing the fact that life developed only within strict limits of each compartment that makes up the atmosphere, hydrosphere, and lithosphere, the Austrian geologist Eduard Suess proposed the term biosphere in 1875. Suess proposed the name biosphere for the conditions promoting life, such as those found on Earth, which includes flora, fauna, minerals, matter cycles, et cetera.

In the 1920s Vladimir I. Vernadsky, a Russian geologist who had defected to France, detailed the idea of the biosphere in his work "The biosphere" (1926), and described the fundamental principles of the biogeochemical cycles. He thus redefined the biosphere as the sum of all ecosystems.

First ecological damages were reported in the 18th century, as the multiplication of colonies caused deforestation. Since the 19th century, with the Industrial Revolution, more and more pressing concerns have grown about the impact of human activity on the environment. The term ecologist has been in use since the end of the 19th century.

=== The ecosystem: Arthur Tansley ===
Over the 19th century, botanical geography and zoogeography combined to form the basis of biogeography. This science, which deals with habitats of species, seeks to explain the reasons for the presence of certain species in a given location.

It was in 1935 that Arthur Tansley, the British ecologist, coined the term ecosystem, the interactive system established between the biocoenosis (the group of living creatures), and their biotope, the environment in which they live. Ecology thus became the science of ecosystems.

Tansley's concept of the ecosystem was adopted by the energetic and influential biology educator Eugene Odum. Along with his brother, Howard T. Odum, Eugene P. Odum wrote a textbook which (starting in 1953) educated more than one generation of biologists and ecologists in North America.

=== Ecological succession – Henry Chandler Cowles ===
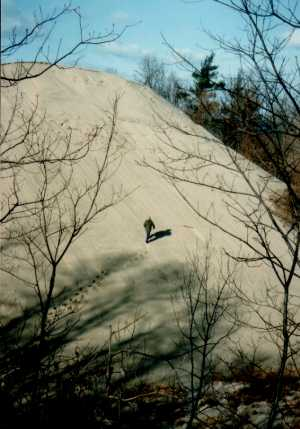
The Indiana Dunes on Lake Michigan, which Cowles referred to in his development of his theories of ecological succession.

At the turn of the 20th century, Henry Chandler Cowles was one of the founders of the emerging study of "dynamic ecology", through his study of ecological succession at the Indiana Dunes, sand dunes at the southern end of Lake Michigan. Here Cowles found evidence of ecological succession in the vegetation and the soil with relation to age. Cowles was very much aware of the roots of the concept and of his (primordial) predecessors. Thus, he attributes the first use of the word to the French naturalist Adolphe Dureau de la Malle, who had described the vegetation development after forest clear-felling, and the first comprehensive study of successional processes to the Finnish botanist Ragnar Hult (1881).

=== Animal Ecology – Charles Elton ===
20th century English zoologist and ecologist, Charles Elton, is commonly credited as "the father of animal ecology". Elton influenced by Victor Shelford's Animal Communities in Temperate America began his research on animal ecology as an assistant to his colleague, Julian Huxley, on an ecological survey of the fauna whilst taking part in the 1921 Oxford University Spitsbergen expedition. Elton's most famous studies were conducted during his time as a biological consultant to the Hudson Bay Company to help understand the fluctuations in the company's fur harvests. Elton studied the population fluctuations and dynamics of snowshoe hare, Canadian lynx, and other mammals of the region. Elton is also considered the first to coin the terms, food chain and food cycle in his famous book Animal Ecology. Elton is also attributed with contributing to disciplines of: invasion ecology, community ecology, and wildlife disease ecology.

=== G. Evelyn Hutchinson – father of modern ecology ===
George "G" Evelyn Hutchinson was a 20th-century ecologist who is commonly recognized as the "Father of Modern Ecology". Hutchinson is of English descent but spent most of professional career studying in New Haven, Connecticut at Yale University. Throughout his career, over six decades, Hutchinson contributed to the sciences of limnology, entomology, genetics, biogeochemistry, mathematical theory of population dynamics and many more. Hutchinson is also attributed as being the first to infuse science with theory within the discipline of ecology. Hutchinson was also one of the first credited with combining ecology with mathematics. Another major contribution of Hutchinson was his development of the current definition of an organism's "niche" – as he recognized the role of an organism within its community. Finally, along with his great impact within the discipline of ecology throughout his professional years, Hutchinson also left a lasting impact in ecology through his many students he inspired. Foremost among them were Robert H. MacArthur, who received his PhD under Hutchinson, and Raymond L. Lindeman, who finished his PhD dissertation during a fellowship under him. MacArthur became the leader of theoretical ecology and, with E. O. Wilson, developed island biography theory. Raymond Lindeman was instrumental in the development of modern ecosystem science.

== 20th century transition to modern ecology ==
"What is ecology?” was a question that was asked in almost every decade of the 20th century. Unfortunately, the answer most often was that it was mainly a point of view to be used in other areas of biology and also "soft", like sociology, for example, rather than "hard", like physics. Although autecology (essentially physiological ecology) could progress through the typical scientific method of observation and hypothesis testing, synecology (the study of animal and plant communities) and genecology (evolutionary ecology), for which experimentation was as limited as it was for, say, geology, continued with much the same inductive gathering of data as did natural history studies. Most often, patterns, present and historical, were used to develop theories having explanatory power, but which had little actual data in support. Darwin's theory, as much as it is a foundation of modern biology, is a prime example.

G. E. Hutchinson, identified above as the "father of modern ecology", through his influence raised the status of much of ecology to that of a rigorous science. By shepherding of Raymond Lindemann's work on the trophic-dynamic concept of ecosystems through the publication process after Lindemann's untimely death, Hutchinson set the groundwork for what became modern ecosystem science. With his two famous papers in the late1950s, "Closing remarks", and "Homage to Santa Rosalia", as they are now known, Hutchinson launched the theoretical ecology which Robert MacArthur championed.

Ecosystem science became rapidly and sensibly associated with the "Big Science"—and obviously "hard" science—of atomic testing and nuclear energy. It was brought in by Stanley Auerbach, who established the Environmental Sciences Division at Oak Ridge National Laboratory, to trace the routes of radionuclides through the environment, and by the Odum brothers, Howard and Eugene, much of whose early work was supported by the Atomic Energy Commission. Eugene Odum's textbook, Fundamentals of Ecology, has become something of a bible today. When, in the 1960s, the International Biological Program (IBP) took on an ecosystem character, ecology, with its foundation in systems science, forever entered the realm of Big Science, with projects having large scopes and big budgets. Just two years after the publication of Silent Spring in 1962, ecosystem ecology was trumpeted as the foremost science of the environment in a series of articles in a special edition of BioScience.

Theoretical ecology took a different path to established its legitimacy, especially at eastern universities and certain West Coast campuses. It was the path of Robert MacArthur, who used simple mathematics in his "Three Influential Papers, also published in the late 1950s, on population and community ecology. Although the simple equations of theoretical ecology at the time, were unsupported by data, they still were still deemed to be "heuristic". They were resisted by a number of traditional ecologists, however, whose complaints of "intellectual censorship" of studies that did not fit into the hypothetico-deductive structure of the new ecology might be seen as evidence of the stature to which the Hutchinson-MacArthur approach had risen by the 1970s.

MacArthur's untimely death in 1972 was also about the time that postmodernism and the "Science Wars" came to ecology. The names of Kuhn, Wittgenstein, Popper, Lakatos, and Feyerbrend began to enter into arguments in the ecological literature. Darwin's theory of adaptation through natural selection was accused of being tautological. Questions were raised over whether ecosystems were cybernetic and whether ecosystem theory was of any use in application to environmental management. Most vituperative of all was the debate that arose over MacArthur-style ecology.

Matters came to a head after a symposium organized by acolytes of MacArthur in homage to him and a second symposium organized by what was disparagingly called the "Tallahassee Mafia" at Wakulla Springs in Florida. The homage volume, published in 1975, had an extensive chapter written by Jared Diamond, who at the time taught kidney physiology at the UCLA School of Medicine, that presented a series of "assembly rules" to explain the patterns of bird species found on island archipelagos, such as Darwin's famous finches on the Galapagos Islands. The Wakulla conference was organized by a group of dissenters led by Daniel Simberloff and Donald Strong, Jr., who were described by David Quammen in his book as arguing that those patterns "might be nothing more than the faces we see in the moon, in clouds, in Rorschach inkblots". Their point was that Diamond's work (and that of others) did not fall within the criterion of falsifiability, laid down for science by the philosopher, Karl Popper. A reviewer of the exchanges between the two camps in an issue of Synthese found "images of hand-to-hand combat or a bar-room brawl" coming to mind. The Florida State group suggested a method that they developed, that of "null" models, to be used much in the way that all scientists use null hypotheses to verify that their results might not have been obtained merely by chance. It was most sharply rebuked by Diamond and Michel Gilpin in the symposium volume and Jonathan Roughgarden in the American Naturalist.

There was a parallel controversy adding heat to above that became known in conservation circles as SLOSS (Single Large or Several Small reserves). Diamond had also proposed that, according to the theory of island geography developed by MacArthur and E. O. Wilson, nature preserves should be designed to be as large as possible and maintained as a unified entity. Even cutting a road through a natural area, in Diamond's interpretation of MacArthur and Wilson's theory, would lead to the loss of species, due to the smaller areas of the remaining pieces. Simberloff, meanwhile, who had defaunated mangrove islands off the Florida coast in his award-winning experimental study under E. O. Wilson and tested the fit of the species-area curve of island biogeography theory to the fauna that returned, had gathered data that showed quite the opposite: that many smaller fragments together sometimes held more species that the original whole. It led to considerable vituperation on the pages of Science.

In the end, in a somewhat Kuhnian fashion, the arguments probably will finally be settled (or not) by the passing of the participants. However, ecology continues apace as a rigorous, even experimental science. Null models, admittedly difficult to perfect, are in use, and, although a leading conservation scientist recently lauded island biogeography theory as "one of the most elegant and important theories in contemporary ecology, towering above thousands of lesser ideas and concept", he nevertheless finds that "the species-area curve is a blunt tool in many contexts" and "now seems simplistic to the point of being cartoonish".

== Timeline of ecologists ==
A list of founders, innovators and their significant contributions to ecology, from Romanticism onward.
Notable figure	Lifespan	Major contribution & citation
Antonie van Leeuwenhoek	1632–1723	First to develop concept of food chains
Carl Linnaeus	1707–1778	Influential naturalist, inventor of science on the economy of nature
Alexander Humboldt	1769–1859	First to describe ecological gradient of latitudinal biodiversity increase toward the tropics in 1807
Charles Darwin	1809–1882	Founder of the hypothesis of evolution by means of natural selection, founder of ecological studies of soils
Elizabeth Catherine Thomas Carne	1817-1873	Geologist, mineralogist and philosopher who observed rural vs urban living, spatially and culturally, finding in country living the best attack on suffocating class divides, healthier living, and best access to natural education.
Herbert Spencer	1820–1903	Early founder of social ecology, coined the phrase 'survival of the fittest'
Karl Möbius	1825–1908	First to develop concept of ecological community, biocenosis, or living community
Ernst Haeckel	1834–1919	Invented the term ecology, popularized research links between ecology and evolution
Victor Hensen	1835–1924	Invented term plankton, developed quantitative and statistical measures of productivity in the seas
Eugenius Warming	1841–1924	Early founder of Ecological Plant Geography
Ellen Swallow Richards	1842–1911	Pioneer and educator who linked urban ecology to human health
Stephen Forbes	1844–1930	Early founder of entomology and ecological concepts in 1887
Vito Volterra	1860–1940	Independently pioneered mathematical populations models around the same time as Alfred J. Lotka.
Vladimir Vernadsky	1869–1939	Founded the biosphere concept
Henry C. Cowles	1869–1939	Pioneering studies and conceptual development in studies of ecological succession
Jan Christiaan Smuts	1870–1950	Coined the term holism in a 1926 book Holism and Evolution.
Arthur G. Tansley	1871–1955	First to coin the term ecosystem in 1936 and notable researcher
Charles Christopher Adams	1873–1955	Animal ecologist, biogeographer, author of first American book on animal ecology in 1913, founded ecological energetics
Friedrich Ratzel	1844–1904	German geographer who first coined the term biogeography in 1891.
Frederic Clements	1874–1945	Authored the first influential American ecology book in 1905
Victor Ernest Shelford	1877–1968	Founded physiological ecology, pioneered food-web and biome concepts, founded The Nature Conservancy
Alfred J. Lotka	1880–1949	First to pioneer mathematical populations models explaining trophic (predator-prey) interactions using logistic equation
Henry Gleason	1882–1975	Early ecology pioneer, quantitative theorist, author, and founder of the individualistic concept of ecology
Charles S. Elton	1900–1991	'Father' of animal ecology, pioneered food-web & niche concepts and authored influential Animal Ecology text
G. Evelyn Hutchinson	1903–1991	Limnologist and conceptually advanced the niche concept
Eugene P. Odum	1913–2002	Co-founder of ecosystem ecology and ecological thermodynamic concepts
Howard T. Odum	1924–2002	Co-founder of ecosystem ecology and ecological thermodynamic concepts
Robert MacArthur	1930–1972	Co-founder on Theory of Island Biogeography and innovator of ecological statistical methods

== Ecological Influence on the Social Sciences and Humanities ==
=== Human ecology ===
Human ecology began in the 1920s, through the study of changes in vegetation succession in the city of Chicago. It became a distinct field of study in the 1970s. This marked the first recognition that humans, who had colonized all of the Earth's continents, were a major ecological factor. Humans greatly modify the environment through the development of the habitat (in particular urban planning), by intensive exploitation activities such as logging and fishing, and as side effects of agriculture, mining, and industry. Besides ecology and biology, this discipline involved many other natural and social sciences, such as anthropology and ethnology, economics, demography, architecture and urban planning, medicine and psychology, and many more. The development of human ecology led to the increasing role of ecological science in the design and management of cities.

In recent years human ecology has been a topic that has interested organizational researchers. Hannan and Freeman (Population Ecology of Organizations (1977), American Journal of Sociology) argue that organizations do not only adapt to an environment. Instead it is also the environment that selects or rejects populations of organizations. In any given environment (in equilibrium) there will only be one form of organization (isomorphism). Organizational ecology has been a prominent theory in accounting for diversities of organizations and their changing composition over time.

=== James Lovelock and the Gaia hypothesis ===
The Gaia theory, proposed by James Lovelock, in his work Gaia: A New Look at Life on Earth, advanced the view that the Earth should be regarded as a single living macro-organism. In particular, it argued that the ensemble of living organisms has jointly evolved an ability to control the global environment – by influencing major physical parameters as the composition of the atmosphere, the evaporation rate, the chemistry of soils and oceans – so as to maintain conditions favorable to life. The idea has been supported by Lynn Margulis who extended her endosymbiotic theory which suggests that cell organelles originated from free living organisms to the idea that individual organisms of many species could be considered as symbionts within a larger metaphorical "super-organism".

This vision was largely a sign of the times, in particular the growing perception after the Second World War that human activities such as nuclear energy, industrialization, pollution, and overexploitation of natural resources, fueled by exponential population growth, were threatening to create catastrophes on a planetary scale, and has influenced many in the environmental movement since then.

=== History and relationship between ecology and conservation and environmental movements ===
Environmentalists and other conservationists have used ecology and other sciences (e.g., climatology) to support their advocacy positions. Environmentalist views are often controversial for political or economic reasons. As a result, some scientific work in ecology directly influences policy and political debate; these in turn often direct ecological research and inquiry.

The history of ecology, however, should not be conflated with that of environmental thought. Ecology as a modern science traces only from Darwin's publication of Origin of Species and Haeckel's subsequent naming of the science needed to study Darwin's theory. Awareness of humankind's effect on its environment has been traced to Gilbert White in 18th-century Selborne, England. Awareness of nature and its interactions can be traced back even farther in time. Ecology before Darwin, however, is analogous to medicine prior to Pasteur's discovery of the infectious nature of disease. The history is there, but it is only partly relevant.

Neither Darwin nor Haeckel, it is true, did self-avowed ecological studies. The same can be said for researchers in a number of fields who contributed to ecological thought well into the 1940s without avowedly being ecologists. Raymond Pearl's population studies are a case in point. Ecology in subject matter and techniques grew out of studies by botanists and plant geographers in the late 19th and early 20th centuries that paradoxically lacked Darwinian evolutionary perspectives. Until Mendel's studies with peas were rediscovered and melded into the Modern Synthesis, Darwinism suffered in credibility. Many early plant ecologists had a Lamarckian view of inheritance, as did Darwin, at times. Ecological studies of animals and plants, preferably live and in the field, continued apace however.

=== Conservation and environmental movements – 20th Century ===
When the Ecological Society of America (ESA) was chartered in 1915, it already had a conservation perspective. Victor E. Shelford, a leader in the society's formation, had as one of its goals the preservation of the natural areas that were then the objects of study by ecologists, but were in danger of being degraded by human incursion. Human ecology had also been a visible part of the ESA at its inception, as evident by publications such as: "The Control of Pneumonia and Influenza by the Weather," "An Overlook of the Relations of Dust to Humanity," "The Ecological Relations of the Polar Eskimo," and "City Street Dust and Infectious Diseases," in early pages of Ecology and Ecological Monographs. The ESA's second president, Ellsworth Huntington, was a human ecologist. Stephen Forbes, another early president, called for "humanizing" ecology in 1921, since man was clearly the dominant species on the Earth.

This auspicious start actually was the first of a series of fitful progressions and reversions by the new science with regard to conservation. Human ecology necessarily focused on man-influenced environments and their practical problems. Ecologists in general, however, were trying to establish ecology as a basic science, one with enough prestige to make inroads into Ivy League faculties. Disturbed environments, it was thought, would not reveal nature's secrets.

Interest in the environment created by the American Dust Bowl produced a flurry of calls in 1935 for ecology to take a look at practical issues. Pioneering ecologist C. C. Adams wanted to return human ecology to the science. Frederic E. Clements, the dominant plant ecologist of the day, reviewed land use issues leading to the Dust Bowl in terms of his ideas on plant succession and climax. Paul Sears reached a wide audience with his book, Deserts on the March. World War II, perhaps, caused the issue to be put aside.

The tension between pure ecology, seeking to understand and explain, and applied ecology, seeking to describe and repair, came to a head after World War II. Adams again tried to push the ESA into applied areas by having it raise an endowment to promote ecology. He predicted that "a great expansion of ecology" was imminent "because of its integrating tendency." Ecologists, however, were sensitive to the perception that ecology was still not considered a rigorous, quantitative science. Those who pushed for applied studies and active involvement in conservation were once more discreetly rebuffed. Human ecology became subsumed by sociology. It was sociologist Lewis Mumford who brought the ideas of George Perkins Marsh to modern attention in the 1955 conference, "Man’s Role in Changing the Face of the Earth." That prestigious conclave was dominated by social scientists. At it, ecology was accused of "lacking experimental methods" and neglecting "man as an ecological agent." One participant dismissed ecology as "archaic and sterile." Within the ESA, a frustrated Shelford started the Ecologists' Union when his Committee on Preservation of Natural Conditions ceased to function due to the political infighting over the ESA stance on conservation. In 1950, the fledgling organization was renamed and incorporated as the Nature Conservancy, a name borrowed from the British government agency for the same purpose.

Two events, however, brought ecology's course back to applied problems. One was the Manhattan Project. It had become the Nuclear Energy Commission after the war. It is now the Department of Energy (DOE). Its ample budget included studies of the impacts of nuclear weapon use and production. That brought ecology to the issue, and it made a "Big Science" of it. Ecosystem science, both basic and applied, began to compete with theoretical ecology (then called evolutionary ecology and also mathematical ecology). Eugene Odum, who published a very popular ecology textbook in 1953, became the champion of the ecosystem. In his publications, Odum called for ecology to have an ecosystem and applied focus.

The second event was the publication of Silent Spring. Rachel Carson's book brought ecology as a word and concept to the public. Her influence was instant. A study committee, prodded by the publication of the book, reported to the ESA that their science was not ready to take on the responsibility being given to it.

Carson's concept of ecology was very much that of Gene Odum. As a result, ecosystem science dominated the International Biological Program of the 1960s and 1970s, bringing both money and prestige to ecology. Silent Spring was also the impetus for the environmental protection programs that were started in the Kennedy and Johnson administrations and passed into law just before the first Earth Day. Ecologists' input was welcomed. Former ESA President Stanley Cain, for example, was appointed an Assistant Secretary in the Department of the Interior.

The environmental assessment requirement of the 1969 National Environmental Policy Act (NEPA), "legitimized ecology," in the words of one environmental lawyer. An ESA President called it "an ecological 'Magna Carta.'" A prominent Canadian ecologist declared it a "boondoggle." NEPA and similar state statutes, if nothing else, provided much employment for ecologists. Therein was the issue. Neither ecology nor ecologists were ready for the task. Not enough ecologists were available to work on impact assessment, outside of the DOE laboratories, leading to the rise of "instant ecologists," having dubious credentials and capabilities. Calls began to arise for the professionalization of ecology. Maverick scientist Frank Egler, in particular, devoted his sharp prose to the task. Again, a schism arose between basic and applied scientists in the ESA, this time exacerbated by the question of environmental advocacy. The controversy, whose history has yet to receive adequate treatment, lasted through the 1970s and 1980s, ending with a voluntary certification process by the ESA, along with lobbying arm in Washington.

Post-Earth Day, besides questions of advocacy and professionalism, ecology also had to deal with questions having to do with its basic principles. Many of the theoretical principles and methods of both ecosystem science and evolutionary ecology began to show little value in environmental analysis and assessment. Ecologist, in general, started to question the methods and logic of their science under the pressure of its new notoriety. Meanwhile, personnel with government agencies and environmental advocacy groups were accused of religiously applying dubious principles in their conservation work. Management of endangered Spotted Owl populations brought the controversy to a head.

Conservation for ecologists created travails paralleling those nuclear power gave former Manhattan Project scientists. In each case, science had to be reconciled with individual politics, religious beliefs, and worldviews, a difficult process. Some ecologists managed to keep their science separate from their advocacy; others unrepentantly became avowed environmentalists.

=== Roosevelt & American conservation ===
Theodore Roosevelt was interested in nature from a young age. He carried his passion for nature into his political policies. Roosevelt felt it was necessary to preserve the resources of the nation and its environment. In 1902 he created the federal reclamation service, which reclaimed land for agriculture. He also created the Bureau of Forestry. This organization, headed by Gifford Pinchot, was formed to manage and maintain the nations timberlands. Roosevelt signed the Act for the Preservation of American Antiquities in 1906. This act allowed for him to "declare by public proclamation historic landmarks, historic and prehistoric structures, and other objects of historic and scientific interest that are situated upon lands owned or controlled by the Government of the United States to be national monuments." Under this act he created up to 18 national monuments. During his presidency, Roosevelt established 51 Federal Bird Reservations, 4 National Game Preserves, 150 National Forests, and 5 National Parks. Overall he protected over 200 million acres of land.

=== Ecology and global policy ===
Ecology became a central part of the World's politics as early as 1971, UNESCO launched a research program called Man and Biosphere, with the objective of increasing knowledge about the mutual relationship between humans and nature. A few years later it defined the concept of Biosphere Reserve.

In 1972, the United Nations held the first international Conference on the Human Environment in Stockholm, prepared by Rene Dubos and other experts. This conference was the origin of the phrase "Think Globally, Act Locally". The next major events in ecology were the development of the concept of biosphere and the appearance of terms "biological diversity"—or now more commonly biodiversity—in the 1980s. These terms were developed during the Earth Summit in Rio de Janeiro in 1992, where the concept of the biosphere was recognized by the major international organizations, and risks associated with reductions in biodiversity were publicly acknowledged.

Then, in 1997, the dangers the biosphere was facing were recognized all over the world at the conference leading to the Kyoto Protocol. In particular, this conference highlighted the increasing dangers of the greenhouse effect – related to the increasing concentration of greenhouse gases in the atmosphere, leading to global changes in climate. In Kyoto, most of the world's nations recognized the importance of looking at ecology from a global point of view, on a worldwide scale, and to take into account the impact of humans on the Earth's environment.

== See also ==
- Humboldtian science
