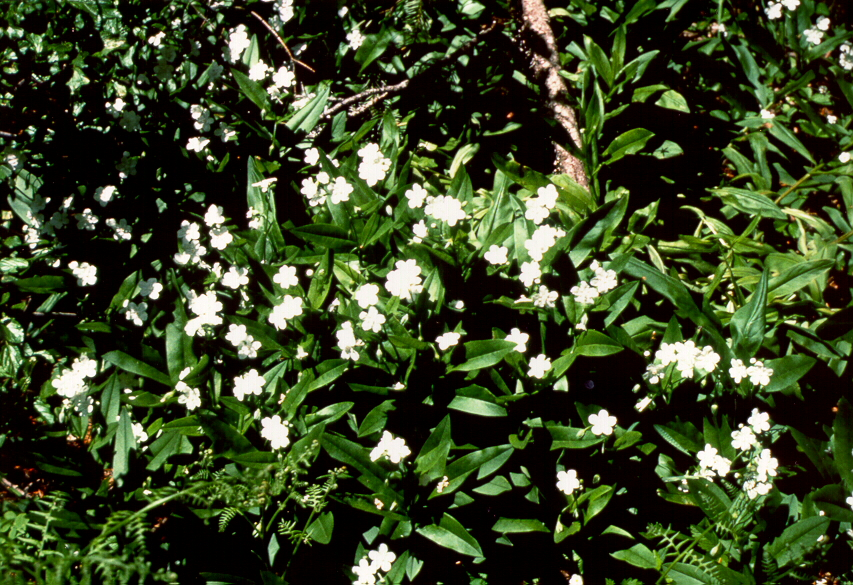
- Dasynotus daubenmirei, Clearwater National Forest

Scientific classification
- Kingdom: Plantae
- Clade: Tracheophytes
- Clade: Angiosperms
- Clade: Eudicots
- Clade: Asterids
- Order: Boraginales
- Family: Boraginaceae
- Genus: Dasynotus; I.M.Johnst.
- Species: D. daubenmirei

Binomial name
- Dasynotus daubenmirei I.M.Johnst.

= Dasynotus =

Genus of flowering plants

Dasynotus is a monotypic genus of flowering plants belonging to the family Boraginaceae; it only contains one known species, Dasynotus daubenmirei. It has the common names Daubenmire's dasynotus and Rocky Mountain whitethroat. It is threatened by fire suppression.

== Taxonomy ==
The Latin specific epithet of daubenmirei is in honour of Rexford F. Daubenmire (1909—1995), an American ecologist that went to the University of Minnesota, where he was taught by William Skinner Cooper (1884–1978), among his fellow students at Minnesota were Henry J. Oosting, Murray Fife Buell and Frank Edwin Egler.

The genus and species were circumscribed by Ivan Murray Johnston in J. Arnold Arbor. vol.29 on page 233 in 1948.

== Description ==
Dasynotus has a unique morphology, when compared to other species of the Boraginaceae family, as it has large white salverform (composed of united petals forming a tube that spreads at the open end) corollas with long horn-like faucal appendages and large nutlets covered with sparse trichomes (hairs).

== Distribution ==
This species is endemic to northern Idaho in the United States. It occurs in Clearwater National Forest.
