= Rexford F. Daubenmire =

American botanist and plant ecologist

- Born: 12 December 1909; Coldwater, Ohio, US
- Died: 27 August 1995 (aged 85)
- Scientific career
- Fields: botany plant ecology

Rexford F. Daubenmire (12 December 1909 — 27 August 1995) was an American botanist and plant ecologist. He made significant contributions to the study of plant ecology throughout the twentieth century, including introducing a vegetation classification scheme, helping define the modern study of ecological succession, and writing the standard reference textbooks for ecologists of the time period. He helped pioneer the sampling techniques still used in vegetation measurement. He served as president of the Ecological Society of America for 1967 and was the 1979 recipient of the Eminent Ecologist Award.

== Early life and education ==
Daubenmire was born on 12 December 1909 in Coldwater, Ohio, but grew up in Indianapolis, Indiana. His father worked on the Pennsylvania Railroad and he was an only child. He earned a Bachelor's degree in botany from Butler University in 1930, graduating magna cum laude. He studied under Ray C. Freisner, head of the botany department, and Stanley A. Cain, a plant ecologist, who both influenced his eventual career. He earned a Masters of Science from the University of Colorado in 1932, studying under Francis Ramaley. He studied the relationship between altitudinal distribution and structures of leaf and conifer twigs.

Daubenmire's doctorate was done at the University of Minnesota under ecologist William Skinner Cooper. Following the mentorship of Cooper, he adopted a view of ecology in which a complex natural system involved both abiotic (non-living) and biotic (living) components, being an early adopter of the word "ecosystem" to describe this view. He performed an ecological study of the Big Woods, a temperate hardwood forest ecoregion found in Minnesota. After graduating, he filled a temporary teaching position at the University of Tennessee.

== Personal life ==
Daubenmire married Jean Boomer in 1938, having met her in Idaho. She also had a Masters of Science degree in plant ecology and assisted him with many of his studies. They performed much of the field work together, and her assistance was acknowledged in many of his publications. The couple had one daughter, Janet.

== Career ==
=== University work ===
Daubenmire taught botany at the University of Idaho for ten years, from 1936 to 1946. In addition to this job, during summers he taught at the Lake Itasca Field Station of University of Minnesota and at the University of Wyoming. During World War II, he taught chemistry to American military personnel.

In 1947, he moved to Washington State University in Pullman, Washington, where much of his research was undertaken. In 1948, only one year after joining WSU's faculty, he created a six-week intensive summer field course for surveying in the Rocky Mountains. He was joined by seven students from universities in Idaho, Michigan, Montana, and Tennessee, as well as his wife Jean Boomer, who was also a botanist. From 1 July through 12 August, the group travelled over 3,000 miles, visiting areas of ecological interest including Palouse Falls, Lookout Pass, Great Falls, Big Timber Canyon, and Glacier National Park. During his tenure, he took trips on his sabbatical years to Costa Rica and Sweden.

He was a member of the Ecological Society of America. He served in positions including chairman and vice-chairman of the Western Section, and was a member of the editorial board, the Survey and Planning Committee, the Committee on Vegetation, and the Committee on Applied Ecology. He served as president of the society for the year of 1967.

Daubenmire taught for twenty-nine years at WSU, retiring in 1975, whereupon he was appointed professor emeritus. Between both Idaho and Washington State, he mentored thirty-five PhD students and eighteen Master's students. Some of his students include F. Herbert Bormann and Tom Tidwell.

==== Retirement ====
After retirement, he and his wife moved to Florida, where they continued studying plant ecology. He studied the plant communities of Florida, and published multiple books and papers. The Daubenmires travelled to multiple locations, including the Amazon rainforest, the Philippines, Malaysia, and Africa, and Rexford led naturalist trips to Ecuador and Costa Rica.

=== Death ===
Daubenmire died on 27 August 1995 in Sorrento, Florida.

== Research ==
=== Continuum vs. Community debate ===
In the early to mid twentieth century, there was debate among plant ecologists as to whether plant communities were randomly established within a continuum, or if they formed discrete and predictable entities. The continuum theory preexisted Daubenmire's community theory, having been championed initially by Henry Allan Gleason, and re-established in the 1950s by University of Wisconsin-Madison professor John Thomas Curtis. It proposed that over an area, a plant species would appear, increase in quantity, then decline, and finally disappear, without distinct communities that could be predictably understood.

Much of Daubenmire's early research was focused on this subject. He criticized Curtis's continuum theory, noting that it was unable to provide any meaningful results because it did not have an organizing principle and could not make predictions. He also argued against their methods — mathematically tabulating the abundance of distribution of plant species — as missing factors beyond just the plants themselves, and that population structures and dynamics were more complex than could be understood just with statistics.

Daubenmire instead proposed the community theory: that all organisms within a community were necessarily ecologically interconnected, though the nature and degree of the interrelations changed depending on context: either obligative or indirect. His work helped pioneer the "ecology of place," understanding how predictions could promote better environmental health and broader ecosystems, while also servicing human needs for natural resources through a scientifically informed process. Decades prior to any fully established understanding of environmentalism, he recognized that an accurate understanding of ecosystems required knowledge of how plant communities operated outside of human economic concerns such as logging and grazing.

=== Changes in plant ecology approaches ===
Some of Daubenmire's contributions to plant ecology were initially seen as subversive and controversial due to providing an ecological lens over a strictly economic, and for diverting from commonly held beliefs and practices. While his criticisms of the continuum theory were accepted by many of his peers, others defended the preexisting paradigm.

In the 1950s, he created a classification scheme for plant communities which emphasized the need to study potential vegetation in an area, not just what is presently available for study after human influence. This was seen as a radical proposition at the time.

In his 1970 book Steppe Vegetation of Washington, he questioned the perceived wisdom of rangeland managers who were in favour of eradicating sagebrush, an economically non-viable plant whose removal provided better growth for valuable grasses in the short-term. He argued instead that a scientifically informed view of managing those systems would recognize the value of all species, not just those that had resource worth, because of how they had impacts, both direct and indirect, on long-term health of the range. He noted that sagebrush protected grasses which would be at risk of overgrazing without it; that its removal would have negative effects on mineral recycling into the soil, making for worse yields of other products in the future; that sagebrush provided habitat for birds that controlled insects; and that it increased soil quality in terms of moisture, by holding snow longer into springtime.

Through decades of fieldwork, Daubenmire was able to classify the plant habitats in the forests and steppes of the Columbia Plateau. He was concerned with the longevity of old-growth forest in the region, fearing that economic concern was driving its destruction: loggers sought younger trees, and would remove older forest in favour of managed plantations more suitable for their work.

=== Pioneering sampling strategies ===
As plant sampling for ecological study was in its infancy during Daubenmire's work, he had to pioneer many strategies and adopt others. He was a proponent of Hormay's line interception technique for monitoring changes in plant communities because of its cost-effectiveness. This involves recording the amount of cover of each plant along a set length of rope, then summing by species and converting into a percentage.

Daubenmire created a simple tool for measuring coverage of plant species within a stand: The Daubenmire cover scale or Daubenmire frame. It was originally a 20 cm x 50 cm plot frame, with one corner divided into a 7 cm x 7 cm square. References are marked for 5%, 25%, 50%, and 75% of the frame. If a plant within the frame fills out the 7 cm x 7 cm square, its cover would be 5% of the sampled area. The original design has since been modified to improve cover accuracy for infrequent species within the frame. It allows cover to be assessed by eye, with the researcher standing directly above where it is placed on the ground. For best results, it is placed along a tape on predetermined transects, with results systematically recorded.

=== Other research ===
Daubenmire studied a range of other subjects within plant ecology and botany, including the effects of fire on vegetation, the effects of soil moisture and temperature on conifer distribution, and lichen. His research was the first to consider fire as an element in ecology.

He discovered a new monotypic genus of Boraginaceae (a family of flowering plants that includes the forget-me-not) which is endemic to only a few square kilometers in northern Idaho. Its binomial name, Dasynotus daubenmirei, commemorates him.

== Legacy ==
Daubenmire's work was overall well received in his lifetime, and he earned several awards from his peers. His first two books, Plants and Environment (1947), and Plant Communities (1968), became standard reference texts for ecologists into the 1990s, and his other works have been cited hundreds of times. His 1959 paper establishing his quadrat sampling technique has been cited over 575 times (as of 2007). His methods for sampling have been widely adopted, including by the United States Forest Service. WSU has created the Rexford Daubenmire Fund for Graduate Education, part of the school's graduate scholarship system. His archives are held at the Washington State University Libraries' Manuscripts, Archives, and Special Collections (MASC).

== Awards ==
- Northwest Scientific Association's Outstanding Scientist Award (1970)
- Eminent Ecologist Award (1977)
- American Foresters Barrington Moore Award (1980)
- Society for Range Management Special Award (1986)
- Honorary Lifetime Membership of The Nature Conservancy

== See also ==
- Murray Fife Buell
- Frank Edwin Egler
- Jean Langenheim
- Henry J. Oosting
- Robert Whittaker
