= Frank Edwin Egler =

American plant ecologist

- Born: April 26, 1911
- Died: December 26, 1996 (aged 85)
- Scientific career
- Doctoral advisor: George E. Nichols
- Other academic advisors: William Skinner Cooper
- Author abbrev. (botany): Egler

Frank Edwin Egler (April 26, 1911 – December 26, 1996) was an American plant ecologist and pioneer in the study of vegetation science. In addition to his groundbreaking research, he assisted Rachel Carson in preparing Silent Spring.

== Early life and education ==
Egler was born in New York City, growing up on Manhattan's West Side. Fifth-grade bird-watching trips to green spaces in the city instilled a love of nature in the frail boy. He went on to the New York State College of Forestry at Syracuse, to pursue a career in landscape engineering, but switched to plant ecology and the University of Chicago, graduating in 1932. At Chicago, he was a student in the last course taught by Henry C. Cowles.

Egler obtained his M.S. in plant ecology from the University of Minnesota in 1934, and his Ph.D. from Yale University in 1936. At Minnesota, he studied with William Skinner Cooper, joining one of the most remarkable cohorts of students ever assembled under one professor (Burgess, p. 193). It included Rexford F. Daubenmire, Murray Fife Buell, and Henry J. Oosting (who went on to become presidents of the Ecological Society of America). Egler had intended to continue under Cooper for his Ph.D., but switched to George E. Nichols and Yale, after Nichols offered him a fellowship to study the vegetation around the Egler summer home in northern Connecticut. Egler had already embarked on its study for his dissertation when Nichols made the offer.

Egler liked to trace his intellectual lineage, through Cooper, to Henry Chandler Cowles. He considered Cooper to be his lifelong mentor and friend.

== Academic and research career ==
Syracuse Forestry lured Egler back as a professor. His independence of mind combined with disruptions caused by World War Two resulted in his losing that position. At the war's end, Egler purchased his parents' Connecticut estate and decided to settle there to become an independent researcher and scholar. He used the proceeds of a family trust fund for support, supplementing it by grants and consulting fees.

Although soured on academics by his experience at Syracuse Forestry, Egler missed having students. He taught occasionally in colleges and universities. When he began his experiments with herbicides, he realized that he needed the prestige that an academic position had once given him. From 1951 to 1955, he was a research associate at the American Museum of Natural History in New York City. His outspokenness on the over-use of herbicides in rights-of-way led to his being asked to resign that position just before the museum's Department of Conservation and General Ecology was disbanded. He rebounded from that setback when he was named a Guggenheim Fellow, also in 1955.

Egler was a prolific writer and a prescient scientist. His 1942 paper, "Vegetation as an Object of Study," was among the first to attempt to apply the logic of philosophy to ecology. The same year, and more than a decade before Charles Elton's influential 1958 book on the subject, he published on invasion ecology. His 1947 study of Hawaiian vegetation is one of three papers credited with helping to finally bring down the Clementsian paradigm that so dominated American ecology to that time (McIntosh, p. 134; Simberloff, p 16). Egler's entertainingly written 1951 "Commentary" on American plant ecology anticipated some of the ideas of science historian and philosopher Thomas S. Kuhn. His research with herbicides was one of the earliest attempts to experimentally test a hypothesis in plant ecology. Along with his numerous descriptive studies of vegetation, his work with herbicides helped Egler demonstrate that succession did not always go through the regular stages that Frederic E. Clements had proposed, but was as often determined by the composition of seeds present after a disturbance. This was Egler's "Initial Floristics" model.

== Early conservationist ==
Throughout his career, Egler was active in conservation work. He was a charter member of the Ecologists' Union and on the Board of Governors when it became The Nature Conservancy. An interesting aside is that the Nature Conservancy may well have become the world's most successful environmental organization because Egler was forced out of his Museum position.

== Contributions to Silent Spring ==
Throughout his career, Egler urged ecologists to value applied and basic research equally in ecology. He urged ecologists to study human-stressed areas along with the pristine habitats they then preferred. He also wanted them to take active stances on environmental issues. When Rachel Carson approached him for help with Silent Spring, however, he had essentially abandoned those efforts in frustration and was no longer calling himself an ecologist. Contact with Carson energized him in his crusade to free his science from the influences of chemical manufacturers. While she was writing her book, he shared much of his experience and expertise with her, contributing long letters with comments and suggestions (Lear, p 400). A consequence was that a passage in Silent Spring having some of Egler's sarcasm received the most criticism from Ian Baldwin in his famously negative review in Science. Egler rose to defend Carson's (and his) views in a series of publications that led to his censure by the Entomological Society of America—and censure of a journal that published his views. That incident helped both to focus and to polarize the issues of professionalism and environmentalism in the science of ecology.

== Later career and honors ==
In 1973–74, Egler served on the Standing Committee for Professionalism at the Ecological Society of America. In 1978, the Society gave him its Distinguished Service Award.

In his later years, Egler used book reviews in Ecology to keep scientists and publishers on their toes, giving praise only when he felt it was due. In his own books, he tried to develop an appreciation for good science in the lay person. Some of his works were written under the anagrammatic pseudonyms of Warren G. Kenfield (Frank Edwin Egler) and Stan R. Foote (Aton Forest).

== Legacy ==
Egler's summer home in northern Connecticut has been preserved as a museum and Research Natural Area, and as a tribute to his life and work. The house is now managed by Aton Forest, Inc., in Norfolk, Connecticut.

== Selected works ==
- "Vegetation as an object of study," Philosophy of Science 9 (1942): 245–60.
- "Indigene versus alien in the development of arid vegetation," Ecology 23 (1942): 14–23.
- "Arid Southeast Oahu vegetation, Hawaii," Ecological Monographs 17 (1947): 383–435.
- "Brush control – an aspect of 'plant-community management,'" Electric Light and Power 29:3 (1951): 98–99, 151.
- "A commentary on American plant ecology, based on the textbooks of 1947-1949," Ecology 32 (1951): 673–694.
- "Vegetation science concepts I: Initial floristic composition, a factor in old-field vegetation development," Vegetatio 4 (1954):412-417.
- "Science, industry, and the abuse of rights of way," Science 127 (1958): 573–80.
- "Pesticides – In Our Ecosystem," American Scientist 52 (1964): 110–36.
- The Way of Science: A Philosophy of Ecology for the Layman (New York: Hafner Publishing Company, 1970).
- The plight of the rightofway domain: victim of vandalism (Mt. Kisco, N.Y.: Futura Media Services, 1975), with Stan R. Foote.

Some of these are available online at the Aton Forest website.
