= Henry J. Oosting =

American ecologist and professor

Henry J. Oosting (March 12, 1903 – October 30, 1968) was an American ecologist and professor. He was born in Holland, Michigan. Oosting attended Hope College (A.B. 1925), Michigan State University (M.S. 1927), and then studied with W.S. Cooper at the University of Minnesota, receiving his Ph.D. in botany in 1931, among other notable Cooper students including Murray Fife Buell, Rexford F. Daubenmire, Frank Edwin Egler, and Jean Langenheim. In 1932, Oosting began his career at Duke University as ecologist in the Department of Botany.

Oosting continued teaching and research at Duke until his retirement, after which research was his focus until his death in 1968. Among his notable students are W.D. Billings, F. Herbert Bormann, and Wilfred B. Schofield. His influence on his field and the respect in which he was held by colleagues are apparent in several memorials. Duke University established "Henry J. Oosting Fellows," an honor given to Ph.D. candidates, as well as an "Oosting Memorial Lecture." Dr. Chris Field, Director of the Carnegie Department of Global Ecology and Professor of Biology and Earth System Science, delivered the 40th Henry J. Oosting Memorial Lecture in April 2011.

The Henry J. Oosting Natural Area was established in Orange County, North Carolina, in his honor, and is considered to have regional significance. A new species of the vascular plant genus Trillium was named Trillium oostingii in honor of Dr. Oosting by L. L. Gaddy in 2008. Ref6

== Career chronology ==
- 1927-1932 Botany instructor, Michigan State University
- 1932-1968 Botany professor, Duke University
- 1955 President of Ecological Society of America
- 1967 Received Meritorious Teaching Award, Association of Southeastern Biologists

== Selected bibliography ==
- The study of plant communities: an introduction to plant ecology. San Francisco: W.H. Freeman. 1948.
