= Eminent Ecologist Award =

The Eminent Ecologist Award is prize awarded annually to a senior ecologist in recognition of an outstanding contribution to the science of ecology. The prize is awarded by the Ecological Society of America. According to the statutes, the recipient may be from any country in the world. However, in practice very few non-U.S. citizens have received the award. The awardee receives lifetime membership in the society.

== Recipients ==
Source: ESA

- 2026 Stephen W. Pacala
- 2025 William H. Schlesinger
- 2024 Juan Carlos Castilla
- 2023 Gretchen Daily
- 2022 Jianguo Liu
- 2021 Steward T. A. Pickett, (United States)
- 2020 Monica G. Turner, (United States)
- 2019 Robert Holt, (United States)
- 2018 F. Stuart Chapin III, (United States)
- 2017 Diana Harrison Wall, (United States)
- 2016 Jerry F. Franklin, (United States)
- 2015 Eric R. Pianka, (United States)
- 2014 Jane Lubchenco, (United States)
- 2013 William A. Reiners, (United States)
- 2012 Robert J. Naiman, (United States)
- 2011 Thomas G. Whitham, (United States)
- 2010 Simon A. Levin, (United States)
- 2009 Stephen P. Hubbell, (United States)
- 2008 Michael Rosenzweig, (United States)
- 2007 Otto Ludwig Lange, (Germany)
- 2006 Daniel Simberloff, (United States)
- 2005 Lawrence B. Slobodkin, (United States)
- 2004 Samuel J. McNaughton, (United States)
- 2003 Richard B. Root, (United States)
- 2002 Charles J. Krebs, (Canada)
- 2001 Paul R. Ehrlich, (United States)
- 2000 Robert Treat Paine, (United States)
- 1999 Crawford S. Holling, (Canada)
- 1998 Gordon Orians, (United States)
- 1997 Frances C. James, (United States)
- 1996 Harold A. Mooney, (United States)
- 1995 Gene E. Likens and Frederick Herbert Bormann, (United States)
- 1994 Edward Osborne Wilson, (United States)
- 1993 Margaret Bryan Davis, (United States)
- 1992 Frank A. Pitelka, (United States)
- 1991 W. Dwight Billings and Nelson George Hairston, (United States)
- 1990 William Edwin Ricker, (Canada)
- 1989 George C. Williams, (United States)
- 1988 Herbert Groves Andrewartha and Louis Charles Birch, (Australia)
- 1987 Archie Carr, (United States)
- 1986 Evelyn C. Pielou, (Canada)
- 1985 Joseph H. Connell, (United States)
- 1984 John L. Harper, (United Kingdom)
- 1983 Walles Thomas Edmondson, (United States)
- 1982 Edward Smith Deevey, Jr., (United States)
- 1981 Robert H. Whittaker, (United States)
- 1980 Donald W. Tinkle, (United States)
- 1979 Rexford F. Daubenmire, (United States)
- 1978 Samuel Charles Kendeigh, (United States)
- 1977 Walter Byron McDougall, (United States)
- 1976 Alton Anthony Lindsey, (United States)
- 1975 Cornelius Herman Muller, (United States)
- 1974 Eugene Odum, (United States)
- 1973 Robert MacArthur, (United States)
- 1972 Ruth M. Patrick, (United States)
- 1971 Thomas Park, (United States)
- 1970 Murray Fife Buell, (United States)
- 1969 Stanley Adair Cain, (United States)
- 1968 Victor Ernest Shelford, (United States)
- 1967 Alfred Edwards Emerson, (United States)
- 1966 Alfred C. Redfield, (United States)
- 1965 Paul Bigelow Sears, (United States)
- 1964 Lee Raymond Dice, (United States)
- 1963 William Skinner Cooper, (United States)
- 1962 G. Evelyn Hutchinson, (United States)
- 1961 Charles S. Elton, (United Kingdom)
- 1960 Walter Pace Cottam, (United States)
- 1959 Henry Allen Gleason, (United States)
- 1958 Arthur William Sampson, (United States)
- 1957 Karl Patterson Schmidt, (United States)
- 1956 George Burton Rigg, (United States)
- 1955 Albert Hazen Wright, (United States)
- 1954 Henry Shoemaker Conard, (United States)

== See also ==
- List of ecology awards
