= William A. Reiners =

William A. Reiners (June 10, 1937) is an American ecologist. He was born in Chicago, Illinois. Reiners attended Knox College (B.A. in Biology, 1959) and Rutgers University (M.S. in Botany, 1962, Ph.D. in Botany, 1964). At the latter, he was a student of Murray F. Buell.

Reiners married Norma Miller on April 21, 1962; they have two children, Peter William Reiners and Derek Seth Reiners.

Reiners’ career in ecology spans 50 years and has deepened the philosophical and conceptual foundations of ecology. Among his influential papers are a series on nitrogen dynamics in New England forests and pioneering long-term studies at Hubbard Brook Experimental Forest. Reiners, now at the University of Wyoming, most recently coauthored a book that explores the philosophy of ecology. In 2013, he received the Eminent Ecologist Award, given to a senior ecologist by the Ecological Society of America in recognition of an outstanding body of ecological work or sustained ecological contributions of extraordinary merit.

== Career chronology ==
- 1959 B.A. Knox College, Galesburg, Illinois
- 1962 M.S. Rutgers University, New Brunswick, NJ
- 1964 Ph.D. Rutgers University, New Brunswick, NJ

== Awards ==
- 2011 Alumni Achievement Award, Knox College
- 2013 Named Eminent Ecologist by the Ecological Society of America

== Selected bibliography ==
The following books were written by William A. Reiners:

- Transport Processes in Ecology: Propagation of Ecological Influences Through Environmental Space (2006) Cambridge University Press, Cambridge, UK. 302 p. ISBN 0-933280-46-7 With Kenneth L. Driese.
- Philosophical Foundations for the Practices of Ecology (2009) Cambridge University Press, Cambridge, UK. ISBN 978-0521133036. With Jeffrey A. Lockwood.

== See also ==
- Eminent Ecologist Award
