= Whitethroat =

Whitethroat may refer to:

== Birds ==
- Birds in the genus Curruca
  - Lesser whitethroat (Curruca curruca curruca), indigenous to Europe
  - Desert whitethroat (Curruca curruca minula), indigenous to Asia from Iran to China
  - Hume's whitethroat (Curruca curruca althaea), indigenous to Southwestern and Central Asia
  - Common whitethroat (Curruca communis), Greater Whitethroat, often known simply as "whitethroat", found in Europe, Asia, and Africa

== Other uses ==
- Dasynotus, a genus of plants
- HMCS Whitethroat, a minelayer
