= Kathryn L. Cottingham =

American ecologist

- Education: Drew University (BS); University of Wisconsin – Madison (PhD)
- Occupation: Ecologist
- Scientific career
- Institutions: Dartmouth College; National Institute of Environmental Health Sciences
- Thesis: Phytoplankton responses to whole-lake manipulations of nutrients and food webs (1996)

Kathryn Linn Cottingham is an American ecologist. She is a Professor of Ecology, Evolution, Environment and Society in the John Sloan Dickey Center for International Understanding at Dartmouth College. She is a Fellow of the Ecological Society of America and American Association for the Advancement of Science. Since 2020, she serves as editor-in-chief of the journal Ecology.

== Early life and education ==
Cottingham earned her bachelor's degree at Drew University in 1990. Here she majored in mathematics and biology, and played lacrosse and field hockey. Cottingham played Lacrosse in the National Collegiate Athletic Association Division III Tournament during her first season and was on the team that won the 1988 Middle Atlantic Conference championship. She was the only NCAA Division III athlete to earn one of the Disney Scholar-Athlete Awards. She moved to the University of Wisconsin–Madison for her graduate studies, where she earned her master's and doctoral degrees under the supervision of Steve Carpenter. She was supported by an National Collegiate Athletic Association postgraduate fellowship. Her PhD research in the Center for Limnology evaluated the effects of nutrients and the food web structure on freshwater plankton. She was one of the first cohort of postdoctoral researchers at the National Center for Ecological Analysis and Synthesis, where she developed early warning indicators and ways to study community dynamics.

== Research and career ==
Cottingham studies the dynamics of lake plankton communities and relationships between terrestrial and aquatic ecosystems. She joined the faculty at Dartmouth College in 1998. She has studied the reasons that cyanobacteria bloom occur, and the consequences of them blooming in low nutrient clear-water lakes. She has investigated ways to manage the growth of these blooms and mitigate the negative impacts of them on ecosystems. Cottingham showed that cyanobacterial blooms create their own optimised environments, driving nitrogen and phosphorus cycling in otherwise low nutrient lakes. She has started work with computer scientists to use big data and artificial intelligence to understand cyanobacteria across the East Coast. Data will be collected using robotic boats, buoys and drones equipped with cameras.

Cottingham also works on environmental health, in particular the occurrence of arsenic in food and drinking water. Her 2012 research on pregnant women's rice consumption and arsenic exposure was selected by the National Institute of Environmental Health Sciences (NIEHS) as one of the most important papers of the year. She identified that women who ate rice had considerably higher urinary arsenic concentrations than those who did not consume rice. She went on to show that white wine, beer, Brussels sprouts and salmon significantly increased arsenic levels in humans.

=== Academic service ===
From 2017 to 2019, Cottingham served as a National Science Foundation Program Director in the Division of Environmental Biology. She returned to Dartmouth College in 2019. Cottingham is involved with several public engagement projects, including acting as Vice Chair of the Science Advisory Boards of the Lake Sunapee Protective Association and Jefferson Project at Lake George.

== Awards and honours ==
- 2015: Elected Fellow of the Ecological Society of America
- 2019: Elected Fellow of the American Association for the Advancement of Science

== Selected publications ==
- Cottingham, Kathryn L. (1997). "Resilience and restoration of lakes". Conservation Ecology. 1: 2–3.
- Cottingham, Kathryn L. (2000). "The relationship in lake communities between primary productivity and species richness". Ecology. 81 (10): 2662–2679. doi:10.1890/0012-9658(2000)081[2662:TRILCB]2.0.CO;2.
- Cottingham, Kathryn L. (2001). "Biodiversity may regulate the temporal variability of ecological systems". Ecology Letters. 4: 72–85. doi:10.1046/j.1461-0248.2001.00189.x.

Cottingham is the Editor-in-Chief of Ecology.
