= Samuel J. McNaughton =

Samuel Joseph McNaughton (August 10, 1939 – January 18, 2024) was an American ecologist and professor at Syracuse University. He received his Ph.D. at University of Texas-Austin in 1964, and was tenured to Syracuse University in 1966.

== Research ==
Sam McNaughton is mainly known for his studies of plant–herbivore interactions and consequences of herbivory to ecosystems. His focus was on ecosystem metabolism. His team's research concentrates on these processes and, particularly, the coupling between trophic levels in ecosystems.

He was mainly interested in ecosystems where large mammals are significant members of the food web, and how those mammals interact with energy flow and nutrient cycling. The focus of his team's field studies was Serengeti National Park, Tanzania, east Africa. It is a grazing ecosystem with Earth's largest concentration of such mammals. Previous locations of research fields have included Yellowstone National Park in the USA, the Galapagos Islands, and southern Kenya. He has spent more than thirty years of exploring the interactions between vegetation and communities of wild grazers in the grasslands of Serengeti National Park. He has also studied differentiation and geographical distributions of ecotypes in Typha.

His team's research has documented the patchy distribution of essential minerals and the importance of "critical" habitats where limiting minerals are in sufficient quantity in soils and plants to meet the nutritional needs of growing young animals and pregnant or lactating females. He documented the response of vegetation, microbes, and animals to supplemental nitrogen, and how the cycles of different minerals interact.

He was given the Eminent Ecologist Award for 2004 by Ecological Society of America and in 2012 was one of their inaugural Fellows.

McNaughton died on January 18, 2024, at the age of 84.

Married – Margaret McNaughton

2 Children

Schooling:- Ph.D., University of Texas-Austin, 1964

Postdoctoral Work Stanford University, 1965-1966

Work Background:

(1992–2024) Syracuse University, William Rand Kenan Jr. Professor of Science

(1966-1992) Syracuse University, Assistant and Associate Professor

(1964-1965) Portland State College, Assistant Professor

== Important Papers ==
Four Older Papers Each Cited Over 100 Times:

McNaughton, S. J. 1979. Grazing as an optimization process: grass-ungulate relationships in the Serengeti. Am. Nat. 113: 691-703.

McNaughton, S. J. 1976. Serengeti migratory wildebeest: facilitation of energy flow by grazing. Science191:92-94.

McNaughton, S. J., and L. L. Wolf. 1970. Dominance and the niche in ecological systems. Science 167: 131-139.

McNaughton, S. J. 1966. Ecotype function in the Typha community-type. Ecol. Monogr. 36: 297-325.
