= Steward Pickett =

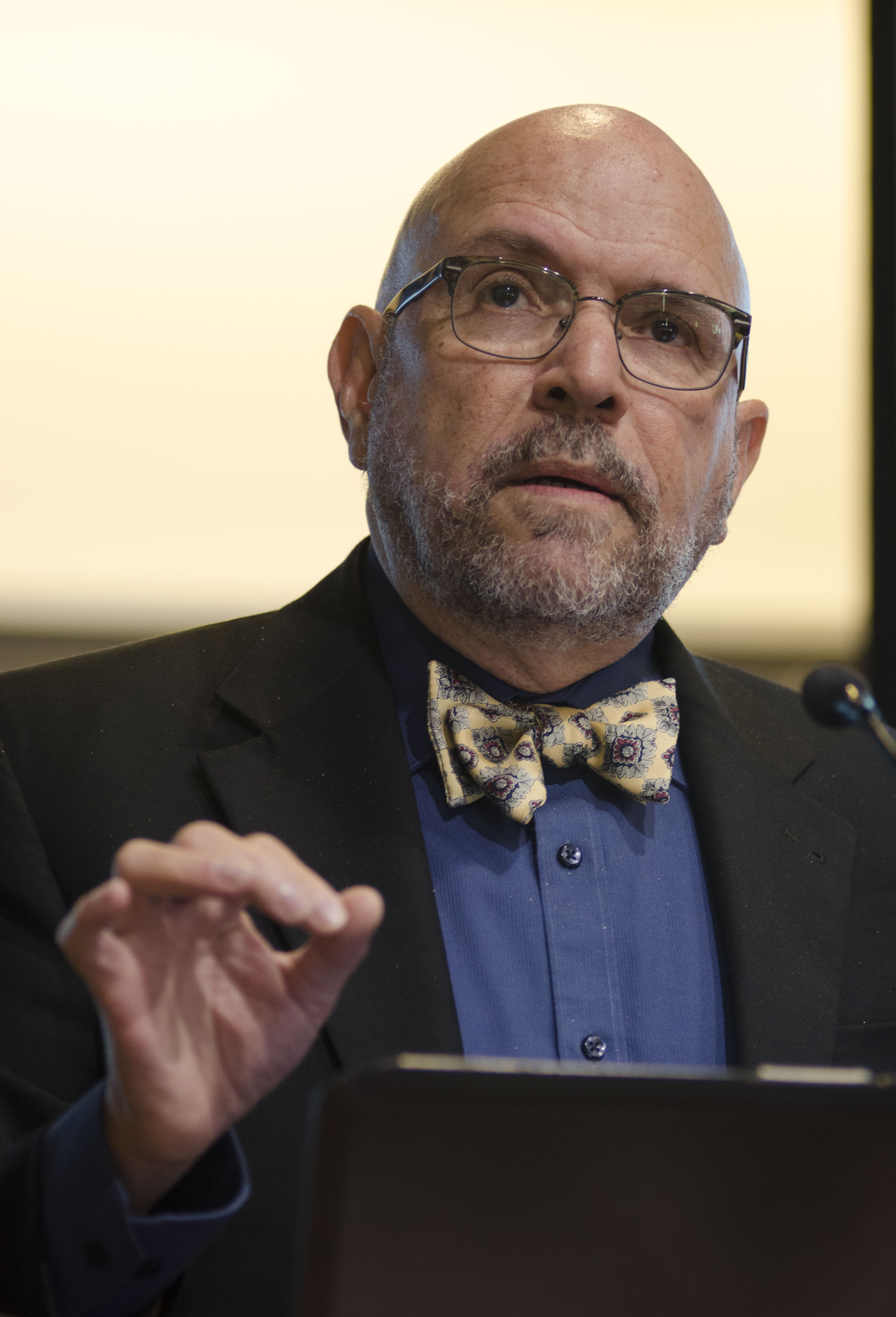
Steward Pickett delivers JJR Lecture at the University of Michigan School of Natural Resources & Environment in 2013

Steward T. A. Pickett is an American plant ecologist and a distinguished senior scientist emeritus at the Cary Institute of Ecosystem Studies. Pickett is the recipient (together with Lenore Fahrig and Simon A. Levin) of the 2021 BBVA Foundation Frontiers of Knowledge Award in Ecology and Conservation Biology for "incorporating the spatial dimension into ecosystem research, in the sense of landscape and its multiple scales, and bringing it to bear in the management of coupled human-natural systems", as well as the Ecological Society of America's 2021 Eminent Ecologist Award.

== Biography ==
Pickett received a B.S. with Honors in botany from the University of Kentucky in 1972 and a Ph.D. in botany from the University of Illinois Urbana-Champaign in 1977. He then worked as an assistant professor and later as an associate professor at Rutgers University, including as a director of the center of the Hutcheson Memorial Forest (1984–86), before joining the Cary Institute of Ecosystem Studies in 1987. He currently (2026) holds the position of distinguished senior scientist emeritus. Pickett is a fellow of the American Academy of Arts and Sciences, the Ecological Society of America, and the National Academy of Sciences.

== Research ==
Pickett's research focuses on (i) the ecology of disturbance, acute events, and disaster, (ii) an improved understanding of social-ecological systems, (iii) urbanization as an ecological process, (iv) spatial patchiness as pattern and process, (v) the influence of social values, legacies, and justice on ecology in cities, and (vii) ecological urban design. Together with Peter S. White, Pickett is the author of The Ecology of Natural Disturbance and Patch Dynamics, a highly cited synthesis of findings and ideas around the topics of (a) patch dynamics in diverse systems, (b) adaptations of organisms and the evolution of populations in patch dynamic environments, and (c) implications of patch dynamics for the organization of communities and the function of ecosystems. He is also well known for his work with José M. Facelli on the dynamics of plant litter and its effects on plant community structure. More recently, he has explored the concept of urban ecological systems with Nancy Grimm, Mary L. Cadenasso, and J. Morgan Grove, among others.
