= Victor Ernest Shelford =

American zoologist and animal ecologist (1877–1968)

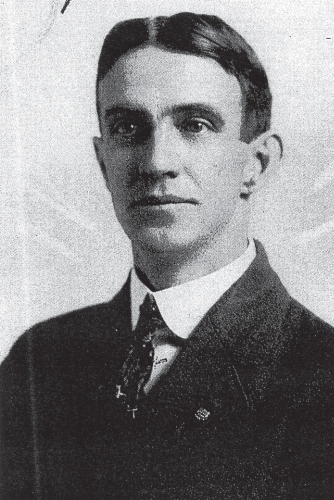
- Shelford in 1913
- Born: September 22, 1877; Chemung, New York, US
- Died: December 27, 1968 (aged 91); Urbana, Illinois, US
- Education: University of Chicago, West Virginia University
- Known for: ecology, Ecological succession
- Scientific career
- Fields: zoology ecology
- Workplaces: University of Illinois

Victor Ernest Shelford (September 22, 1877 – December 27, 1968) was an American zoologist and animal ecologist who helped to establish ecology as a distinct field of study. He was the first president of the Ecological Society of America in 1915, and helped found the Nature Conservancy in the 1940s. Shelford's early visits to and study of Volo Bog in Northern Illinois helped establish its ecological significance. Volo Bog became the first purchase of the Illinois Nature Conservancy.

== Background and education ==
Shelford was born in Chemung, New York, the eldest son of Alexander Hamilton Shelford and Sarah Ellen Rumsey Shelford. After ten years of schooling, he taught at public schools in Chemung County, New York in 1894. He attended Cortland Normal and Training School for two years and took a teaching certificate, and returned to teaching at public schools from 1897 to 1899. From 1899 to 1901 he attended West Virginia University, where he was influenced by his uncle William E. Rumsey, the assistant state entomologist. In 1901, West Virginia University's president, Jerome H. Raymond, accepted a professorship at the University of Chicago, where he secured a scholarship for Shelford, who soon transferred. Here he took a position as associate and instructor in zoology from 1903 to 1914. Much of his early work was greatly influenced by Henry C. Cowles. Shelford wrote his doctoral thesis on "Tiger Beetles of Sand Dunes," which described the relation between beetle populations and vegetational succession, a topic of interest to Cowles. He completed his paper in 1907 and received a Ph.D. on June 11 of the same year. The next day he married Mary Mabel Brown, with whom he had two children.

== Early career ==
His thesis work led him to five further publications on "Ecological Succession," which were published in the Biological Bulletin in 1911 and 1912. By 1913 he published one of his great works on ecology, Animal Communities in Temperate America. He took a position for the University of Illinois, where he ended up spending most of his career, in 1914 as an assistant and associate professor of zoology. From then he helped organize the Ecological Society of America (ESA), and became its first president in 1916. He edited and helped compile Naturalist's Guide to the Americas, a 761-page volume published in 1926 that served as an inventory of preserved natural areas and areas in need of protection, for the ESA. This helped him with his later work, The Ecology of North America (1963).

By 1927 Shelford was made a full professor in his position at the University of Illinois. He also was interested in experimental research in both the field and the laboratory. In 1929 he had published Laboratory and Field Ecology, which served as a method book for research in animal ecology. Shelford was known to travel into the field every summer to conduct research. He initiated the "century-cycle" project in 1933 at the University of Illinois' William Trelease Woods, which was used to study the relation between vertebrate and invertebrate populations with environmental factors. The first fifteen years of data collected from this project was published in 1951 in Ecological Monographs. Shelford was the biologist in charge for the Illinois Natural History Survey at their research laboratories from 1914 to 1929. He had also been director of marine ecology at the Puget Sound Biological Station during alternate summers from 1914 to 1930. Some of his work from this time was published in 1935 in Ecological Monographs.

== Later life and work ==
Much of Shelford's work was on terrestrial ecology, but he also did much aquatic research. Some of his publication in Ecology were studies from locations such as stream communities (1929), bottom communities in western Lake Erie (1942), analysis of tundra communities (1935), and of Mississippi floodplains (1954). He published a work in 1939 in Bio-Ecology in collaboration with Frederic E. Clements which attempted to integrate animal, plant, and aquatic ecologies as part of an ideal community. He left the University of Illinois in 1946, but the same year he founded the Ecologist's Union, an organization which promoted the need to preserve entire ecological communities as part of nature conservation. The Union was founded in response to the ESA deciding it would be inappropriate for a scientific society to take a political stance. In 1950 The Ecologist's Union changed its name to The Nature Conservancy, which became a leading national organization for protecting natural areas.

Shelford's work with Clements helped to begin to develop the idea of biomes by characterizing them through flora and fauna. His next work took this further. Representing his last major work, The Ecology of North America (1963) brought Shelford throughout North America in his research. In 1968, he received the Eminent Ecologist Award of the Ecological Society of America for his lifelong contributions to the field of ecology.

He also chaired numerous committees, including the Committee on the Preservation of Natural Conditions of the Ecological Society from 1917 to 1938, and the National Research Council Committee on Grasslands from 1932 to 1939. In addition, he founded the Grassland Research Foundation in 1939, which he presided over in 1958, and served as chairman of their scientific advisory board from 1959 to 1968. He died in Urbana, Illinois.

== See also ==
- Shelford's law of tolerance
