= Evelyn Chrystalla Pielou =

Canadian ecologist

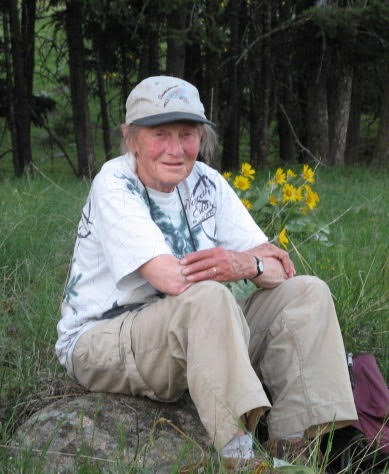
- Pielou in the meadows above Kelowna and Okanagan Lake in spring
- Born: 20 February 1924; Bognor Regis, England, U.K.
- Died: 16 July 2016 (aged 92); Comox, British Columbia, Canada
- Education: University of London
- Spouse: Patrick Pielou
- Scientific career
- Institutions: Canadian Department of Forestry; Canadian Department of Agriculture; Queen's University; Dalhousie University; University of Lethbridge

Evelyn Chrystalla "E. C." Pielou (February 20, 1924 – July 16, 2016) was a Canadian statistical ecologist.

== Biography ==
Pielou studied at the University of London, where she obtained her bachelor's degree in botany in 1951 and her PhD in 1962. From 1963 to 1964, she worked as a researcher for the Canadian Department of Forestry, followed by the Canadian Department of Agriculture between 1964 and 1967. Later she was professor of biology at Queen's University, Kingston, Ontario (1968–71) and at Dalhousie University in Halifax, Nova Scotia (1974–81) and then Oil Sands Environmental Research Professor working out of the University of Lethbridge, Alberta (1981–86).

Pielou was the second woman to win the Eminent Ecologist Award (1986) from the Ecological Society of America. She was one of the inaugural Fellows of the Ecological Society of America in 2012. She has contributed significantly to the development of mathematical ecology, the mathematical modeling of natural systems, and wrote six academic books on the subject. She lived in Comox, British Columbia, Canada, and wrote popular books on natural history until her death in July, 2016.

== Contributions ==
=== Pielou's evenness ===
Pielou's evenness is a diversity index that measures diversity along with species richness. While species richness is the number of different species in a given area, evenness is the count of individuals of each species in an area. A calculated value of Pielou's evenness ranges from 0 (no evenness) to 1 (complete evenness). When taken into account along with other indices such as Simpson's index or Shannon's index, a more thorough description of a community's structure can be interpreted.

=== Mathematical ecology ===
Pielou's approach added mathematical modelling to ecology. Quantifiable analyses could be done with theoretical ecology in areas like population and community ecology. Mathematics would provide insight into, for example, which factors are most significant to ecosystem stability and by how much compared to others.

One of Pielou's papers mentioned the importance and uses of mathematical modelling in ecology as well as their limitations. Population dynamics was better explained as to why they behaved in the ways that they did through modelling. Predictions to an ecosystem's behaviour and its outcomes became more of an explanation as to why, rather than simply a forecast, through the use of such models. If a model was unrealistic, it did not mean that it was wrong. Mathematical modelling allowed the creation of new hypotheses looking into why the model did not match observations. An outcome was not always one or the other, as it might have been different due to unforeseen circumstances or conditions initially thought as unimportant. This allowed mathematical models in ecology to be used as a standard for comparisons with other systems. No two ecosystems are identical, and the significant differences between them could be more easily identified.

== Selected works ==
=== Scholarly books ===
- Introduction to Mathematical Ecology (1969). Wiley-Interscience, New York. ISBN 0-471-68918-1
- Population and community ecology: principles and methods (1974). Gordon and Breach, New York. ISBN 0-677-03580-2
- Ecological diversity (1975). Wiley, New York. ISBN 0-471-68925-4
- Mathematical ecology (1977). Wiley, New York. ISBN 0-471-01993-3
- Biogeography (1979). Wiley, New York. ISBN 0-471-05845-9
- The interpretation of ecological data: a primer on classification and ordination (1984). Wiley, New York. ISBN 0-471-88950-4

=== Popular books ===
- After the Ice Age: The Return of Life to Glaciated North America (1991). University of Chicago Press. ISBN 0-226-66811-8
- A Naturalist's Guide to the Arctic (1994). University of Chicago Press. ISBN 0-226-66814-2
- Fresh Water (2000). University of Chicago Press. ISBN 0-226-66815-0
- The energy of nature (2001). University of Chicago Press. ISBN 0-226-66806-1
- The World of Northern Evergreens (2011). Comstock Publishing Associates (a division of Cornell University Press). ISBN 0-8014-2116-0
