= Margaret Tomlinson =

British photographer (1905-1997)

- Born: 20 September 1905
- Died: 9 October 1997 (aged 92)
- Other name: Margaret Tansley
- Occupation: Photographer
- Known for: Architectural photography
- Relatives: Arthur Tansley (father)

Margaret Tomlinson (1905 – 1997) was an English photographer and architect, best known for her work with the National Buildings Record (NBR), which was formed during World War II to record British architecture under the threat of destruction from aerial bombing.

== Early life and education ==
Tomlinson (née Tansley) was born on 20 September 1905. She was the daughter of Sir Arthur Tansley, Professor of Botany at the University of Oxford. She was educated at The Perse School in Cambridge and then studied architecture at Newnham College, Cambridge, a women-only college, from where she graduated in 1927. She later obtained an MA from the same college. In 1926, she married her tutor and they had two children. After the marriage ended in 1941 she moved with her children to Devon to be close to her family.

== Career ==
Needing work, Tomlinson accepted a position photographing important buildings in danger of being destroyed by German bombing during World War II. This was being carried out by the National Buildings Record (NBR), which was set up quickly in early 1941 to photograph and document historic buildings and places before they were destroyed by aerial bombing. Staff and volunteers were recruited to capture both buildings at risk of destruction and architectural details of damaged buildings before they were demolished. She became the first of several female photographers employed by the organization. Tomlinson was well qualified for this having been photographing buildings for journals and architects and working for an advertising agency from 1930. She was provided with a list of buildings to be photographed, a wartime permit to photograph, a supporting letter for the local police, lest they thought she was a spy, and petrol coupons for her 1936 Austin 7. Despite initial ill health and some technical difficulties she managed to supply around 3,500 images of threatened and bomb-damaged architecture in the West Country. These included views of the impact of major bombing raids on the cities of Exeter and Plymouth. Exeter was one of the victims of what became known as the Baedeker raids, named after the German Baedeker travel guides, leading to some of Tomlinson's most memorable photographs. The bombing exposed city walls, a Roman pavement, and Norman stonework, which she recorded in detail.

In January 1946 Tomlinson was offered a position with the Ministry of Town and Country Planning, creating lists of historic buildings. She took up the position while continuing to finish writing her NBR reports, and doing freelance work on weekends. In 1950, she returned to photograph extensively for the NBR in Devon, although resource limitations meant that she was mainly limited to photographing buildings planned for demolition. She moved from Devon to Little Easton in Essex, midway between her office in London and her parents' home in Grantchester, near Cambridge. She then spent ten years with the Victoria County History, an English history project started in 1899, which aimed to create an encyclopaedic history of the counties of England. She was initially employed part-time and then appointed to a full-time post. She played an important part in reviving the project after the war, writing articles and taking photographs for several of the county histories. As a registered architect, she also designed buildings, including a house for her aunt. In 1983, she published a history of her Devon family's involvement in the lace industry, entitled Three Generations in the Honiton Lace Trade.

== Death and legacy ==
Tomlinson died in Uttlesford, Essex on 9 October 1997. Most of her work is now held at the Historic England Archive, which has undertaken considerable work to restore some of her negatives.
