= Shelford's law of tolerance =

Ecological principle

Shelford's law of tolerance is a principle developed by American zoologist Victor Ernest Shelford in 1911. It states that an organism's success is based on a complex set of conditions and that each organism has a certain minimum, maximum, and optimum environmental factor or combination of factors that determine success. The further elaboration on the theory of tolerance is credited to Ronald Good.

1. Points out the second limitation of Liebig's law of the minimum - that factors act in concert rather than in isolation. A low level of one factor can sometimes be partially compensated for by appropriate levels of other factors.

In case of chemical reactions it is known as law of limiting factor.

  - A corollary to this is that two factors may work synergistically (e.g. 1 + 1 = 5), to make a habitat favorable or unfavorable.
1. Geographic distribution of sugar maple.
  - It cannot tolerate average monthly high temperatures above 24–27 °C or winter temperatures below −18 °C. The western limit is determined by dryness, and this coincides with the western limits of forest vegetation in general.
  - Because temperature and rainfall interact to determine the availability of water, sugar maple tolerates lower annual precipitation at the edge of its northern range (by about 50 cm).
2. Good restated the theory of tolerance as: Each and every species is able to exist and reproduce successfully only within a definite range of environmental conditions.
3. The law of tolerance, or theory of tolerance, is best illustrated by a bell shaped curve.
  - The range of the optimum.
4. Tolerance ranges are not necessarily fixed. They can change as:
  - Seasons change.
  - Environmental conditions change.
  - Life stage of the organism changes.
  - Example – blue crabs. The eggs and larvae require higher salinity than adults.
5. The range of the optimum may differ for different processes within the same organism.
  - Photosynthesis and growth in the pea plant
