= Jean Langenheim =

American plant ecologist and ethnobotanist

Jean H. Langenheim
- Langenheim in 1962 at Harvard University
- Born: Jean Harmon; September 5, 1925; Homer, Louisiana
- Died: March 28, 2021 (aged 95); Santa Cruz, California
- Education: University of Minnesota (Ph.D., 1953; M.S., 1949); University of Tulsa (B.S., 1946)
- Scientific career
- Fields: Plant ecology Paleobotany; Ethnobotany
- Workplaces: University of California Santa Cruz; Harvard University; University of Illinois; University of California Berkeley; San Francisco College for Women (now Lone Mountain College); Mills College; Rocky Mountain Biological Laboratory
- Thesis: Vegetation and environmental patterns in the Crested Butte Area, Gunnison County, Colorado
- Doctoral advisor: William Skinner Cooper

Jean H. Langenheim (née Harmon; September 5, 1925 – March 28, 2021) was an American plant ecologist and ethnobotanist, highly respected as an eminent scholar and a pioneer for women in the field. She has done field research in arctic, tropical, and alpine environments across five continents, with interdisciplinary research that spans across the fields of chemistry, geology, and botany. Her early research helped determine the plant origins of amber and led to her career-long work investigating the chemical ecology of resin-producing trees, including the role of plant resins for plant defense and the evolution of several resin-producing trees in the tropics. She wrote what is regarded as the authoritative reference on the topic: Plant Resins: Chemistry, Evolution, Ecology, and Ethnobotany, published in 2003.

Langenheim earned a PhD in botany with a minor in geology in 1953 from the University of Minnesota. She was the first female faculty member in the natural sciences and first woman to be promoted to full professor at the University of California, Santa Cruz. She was the first woman to serve as president for the Association for Tropical Biology, second woman to serve as president of the Ecological Society of America (ESA) and Society for Economic Botany, founded and served as the first president for the International Society of Chemical Ecology, and was a fellow of the American Association for the Advancement of Science and the California Academy of Sciences. During her time as ESA president, she initiated a project to document women's experiences and contributions to the field of ecology and conducted a follow-up project in 1996. Her research was summarized in two publications, and resulted in a large historical collection and a continued effort by ESA to document women's contributions to the field.

== Early life and education ==
Langenheim was born in Homer, Louisiana in 1925 and grew up in Tulsa, Oklahoma. She graduated from Tulsa Central High School in 1943.

Langenheim received a Bachelor of Science degree in biology from the University of Tulsa (UT) in 1946. She was the first woman student body president at UT. She earned her Master of Science in 1949 and PhD in 1953, both in botany with a minor in geology from the University of Minnesota. Her PhD advisor was leading plant ecologist W.S. Cooper, who went against university policy to sponsor her as a doctoral student; at the time, women could pursue up to a Master's degree. Her dissertation was entitled, "Vegetation and environmental patterns in the Crested Butte Area, Gunnison County, Colorado " and was subsequently published in Ecological Monographs.

== Career and legacy ==
Langenheim has conducted interdisciplinary research across five continents in the fields of plant ecology, paleobotany, and ethnobotany. She has conducted field work in the western United States, Mexico, Brazil, Colombia, Australia, New Zealand, Angola, Kenya, Ghana, and the Amazon rainforest. Her work has spanned the fields of botany, geology, and chemistry and included research on tropical plants, redwoods, and Pacific coast plants. She is known internationally for her research and is considered a trailblazer in plant sciences and ecology, and a pioneer for women in the field. She began her career at a time when opportunities for women in sciences were limited. In the introduction to her memoir, The Odyssey of a Woman Field Scientist, she recounts:

"I lived through the period of being the token woman in numerous situations; I was not an activist fighting on the front lines, so to speak, but tried to demonstrate the capability of women through my own hard work and accomplishments."

She was the first female faculty member in the natural sciences at the University of California, Santa Cruz (UCSC) when she joined the faculty in 1966, and the first woman at the university to be promoted to full professor when she became Chair of the biology department in 1973. She was an advisor or co-advisor for 41 graduate students during her time on the faculty. She taught undergraduate and graduate classes at UCSC from 1966-1994, retired from the university officially in 1994, but continued to advise graduate students as emerita faculty until 2009 and remain active in research, the university community, and scientific societies.

Langenheim was the first woman to serve as president for the Association for Tropical Biology (now the Association for Tropical Biology and Conservation) in 1985 and second woman to serve as president for the Ecological Society of America (ESA) from 1986–87 and the Society for Economic Botany from 1993-94. She also founded and served as the first president for the International Society of Chemical Ecology from 1986-87 and served as academic vice president for the Organization for Tropical Studies from 1975-77.

=== Early career ===
After completing her PhD, Langenheim advanced her career in teaching and plant ecology research at a variety of institutions. She was an instructor in field ecology at the Rocky Mountain Biological Lab (RMBL) from 1953–66 and served as a member of the RMBL board of directors (1962–65) and as vice president (1965–66). From 1955-59, she was a lecturer, instructor, and research associate at San Francisco College for Women (now Lone Mountain College) and Mills College. Langenheim credits her time at these women-only institutions as preparing her to teach and to support women in the field:

"I taught one year at Mills College and several years at San Francisco College for Women. These experiences at fine liberal arts colleges, where women’s issues were at the forefront, prepared me [for] action supporting women scientists, as well as for later teaching at UCSC with a liberal arts approach to undergraduate education."

She was also a research associate in the botany department at the University of California Berkeley from 1954–59 and a teaching associate in the botany department at the University of Illinois Urbana from 1959-62. From 1962 through 1966 she was a research fellow in the Harvard University Biological Labs, a scholar of the Radcliffe Institute for Independent Study (now the Bunting Institute), a research associate in the Harvard Botanical Museum, a Cabot Fellow, and an American Association of University Women Wiley Fellow. It was during her time at Harvard that she began her research on the ecology and evolution of plant resins and amber.

Langenheim joined the faculty of UCSC in 1966, one year after the campus was established. She was a founding member of the Adlai E. Stevenson College, where she lived as the faculty preceptor for several years, and helped develop the graduate programs at the university. Her botany course, co-taught with plant physiologist Kenneth Thimann, was "highly popular because of the way it related plants to human affairs" and led to publication of a textbook in 1982 entitled Botany: Plant Biology and Its Relation to Human Affairs. She also taught graduate courses in tropical and chemical ecology and the history of ecological concepts. She was a visiting professor at Harvard and the Universidade de Pará in Brazil in 1974, and served as Chair of the biology department at UCSC from 1974-1976.

=== Plant resins and amber ===
Langenheim is well known for her more than 40 years investigating plant resins and amber. Her research on plant resins spans from the chemistry, geologic history, and ecological role to their uses throughout human history. In 1961, she began conducting research at Harvard University to study fossilized plant resin, also known as amber, and the ecology and evolution of resin-producing trees in the tropics. While at Harvard, she conducted the first chemical studies of amber's plant origins through geologic time and wrote a seminal paper on the subject, published in Science in 1969, that established her as the leading expert on botanical sources of amber. It was this work that led to her career-long chemical ecology research on tropical resin-producing trees, including the mechanisms for producing resin and the role they play in insect and disease defense. She wrote what is regarded as the authoritative reference on the subject: Plant Resins: Chemistry, Evolution, Ecology, and Ethnobotany, published in 2003. The book was awarded the 2004 Mary W. Klinger Book Award from the Society for Economic Botany, which is given for an "outstanding book published in the discipline of Economic/Ethno Botany."

=== Philanthropy ===
Langenheim has a history of philanthropic giving to UCSC. In 2004, she established the Jean H. Langenheim Graduate Fellowship in Plant Ecology and Evolution with an endowment gift of $200,000, to support students studying terrestrial plant ecology and evolution. When she published her memoir in 2010, all royalties from sales of the book were donated to the fellowship endowment. She also donated copies of her memoir to the UCSC Arboretum gift shop, with proceeds from sales going to support the Arboretum.

In 2006, she established the Jean H. Langenheim Endowed Chair in Plant Ecology and Evolution with a gift of $350,000 to the university "to support and encourage research and teaching in the area of terrestrial plant ecology and evolution, including studies of human impacts on plants, such as global warming, introduction of invasive plants, and ecosystem destruction."

=== Documenting women's contributions to ecology ===
In 1986, Langenheim began a project to document the careers, experiences, and accomplishments of other women contemporaries in ecology. She started the project because she was the second woman president of ESA at the time, and wanted to highlight the accomplishments of other women in the field:

"Since there have been so few women officers, and I was the only woman president, except E. Lucy Braun, I decided that I would do my Presidential Address on the history of women’s contributions to ecology. This would not only ”educate” many, but would also provide the opportunity to give tribute to the accomplishments of women, and to many who have remained essentially “invisible” (and hence unrecognized)."

The project took two years, with surveys received from 55 women ecologists, and culminated in a speech to ESA members entitled "The Path and Progress of American Women Ecologists", which was subsequently published in the ESA Bulletin in December 1988. In 1996, she contacted colleagues again as an update to this project, with a focus on women's research contributions. The results of this second survey were published in the Annual Review of Ecology and Systematics in 1996 in an article entitled "Early History and Progress of Women Ecologists: Emphasis Upon Research Contributions". Her work to document the careers and accomplishments of women in ecology made her the ESA de facto expert on the subject, and created a rich history, commentary, and legacy of women in ecology. ESA's efforts to document women's contributions to the field continue today based on her work in their "Women in Ecology Series."

== Honors and awards ==
- 1967 Elected Fellow of the American Association for the Advancement of Science
- 1972 Cooley Award from the American Society of Plant Taxonomists
- 1973 Elected Fellow to California Academy of Sciences
- 1974-76 Chair, UCSC biology department
- 1975-77 Academic vice president, Organization for Tropical Studies
- 1979 University of Tulsa Distinguished Alumna Award
- 1981 Fellow of the Institute of Advanced Studies, Research School of Biology, Australian National University
- 1985 President, Association for Tropical Biology (now the Association for Tropical Biology and Conservation)
- 1986-87 President, Ecological Society of America
- 1986-87 Founder and President, International Society of Chemical Ecology
- 1993-94 President, Society for Economic Botany
- 2004 California Botanical Society dedicated its 2004 volume of the journal Madroño to her
- 2006 Centennial Award from the Botanical Society of America for "contributions to the advancement of the plant sciences"
- 2006 Fellows Medal of the California Academy of Sciences for "decades of excellence in contribution to the advancement of science and to the life of this institution"
- 2011 Sigma Delta Epsilon (Graduate Women in Science) national honorary membership
- 2012 Elected Fellow of the Ecological Society of America

== Selected works ==
Langenheim has published over 130 scientific papers, book chapters, and several books, including:

- Jean H. Langenheim. 1962. Vegetation and Environmental Patterns in the Crested Butte Area, Gunnison County, Colorado. Ecological Monographs. Vol. 32, Iss. 3, pp. 249–285.
- Jean H. Langenheim. 1969. Amber: A Botanical Inquiry. Science. Vol. 163, No. 3872, pp. 1157–1169.
- Langenheim, J. H., Thimann, K. V. 1982. Botany: Plant Biology and Its Relation to Human Affairs. United Kingdom: Wiley. 624 pp.
- Jean H. Langenheim. 1988. Address of the Past President: Davis, California, August 1988: The Path and Progress of American Women Ecologists. Bulletin of the Ecological Society of America. Vol. 69, No. 4, pp. 184–197.
- Jean H. Langenheim. 1996. Early History and Progress of Women Ecologists: Emphasis Upon Research Contributions. Annual Review of Ecology and Systematics. Vol. 27, pp. 1–53.
- Jean H. Langenheim. 2003. Plant Resins: Chemistry, Evolution, Ecology, and Ethnobotany. Timber Press, Oregon. 586 pp.
- Memoir and biography: Jean H. Langenheim. 2010. The Odyssey of a Woman Field Scientist: A Story of Passion, Persistence, and Patience. Xlibris. 539 pp. https://books.google.com/books?id=IjNWRwAACAAJ
