= Frontiers in Ecology and the Environment =

- December 2013 cover
- Discipline: Ecology, environmental science
- Language: English

Publication details
- History: 2003-present
- Publisher: Ecological Society of America (United States)
- Frequency: 10/year
- Open access: Special Issues; Commentaries; Life Lines
- Impact factor: 10 (2023)

Standard abbreviations
- ISO 4: Front. Ecol. Environ.

Indexing
- ISSN: 1540-9295 (print); 1540-9309 (web)
- LCCN: 2003252462
- OCLC no.: 50198052

Links
- Journal homepage; Online access

Frontiers in Ecology and the Environment is a peer-reviewed scientific journal issued ten times per year, and consists of peer-reviewed, synthetic review articles on all aspects of ecology, the environment, and related disciplines, as well as short, high-impact research communications of broad interdisciplinary appeal. Additional features include editorials, commentaries, a letters section, Life Lines, job ads, and special columns. It is published by Wiley-Blackwell on behalf of the Ecological Society of America (ESA). According to the Journal Citation Reports, the journal has a 2021 impact factor of 13.780, ranking it eleventh out of 279 journals in the category "Environmental Sciences" and fourth out of 174 journals in the category "Ecology".

== Aims and scope ==
Frontiers in Ecology and the Environment is a benefit of membership of the ESA. International in scope and interdisciplinary in approach, Frontiers focuses on current ecological issues and environmental challenges.

Frontiers is aimed at professional ecologists and scientists working in related disciplines. With content that is timely, interesting, and accessible, even to those reading outside their own area of expertise, it has a broad, interdisciplinary appeal and is relevant to all users of ecological science, including policy makers, resource managers, and educators.

Frontiers covers all aspects of ecology, the environment, and related subjects, focusing on global issues, broadly impacting research, cross-disciplinary or multi-country endeavors, new techniques and technologies, new approaches to old problems, and practical applications of ecological science.

The journal is sent to all ESA members as part of their membership, and is also available by subscription to institutional libraries.

== Abstracting and indexing ==
Frontiers in Ecology and the Environment is covered by Current Contents Agriculture, Biology, and Environmental Sciences, Science Citation Index, ISI Alerting Services, Cambridge Scientific Abstracts, Biobase, Geobase, Scopus, CAB Abstracts, and EBSCO Environmental Issues and Policy Index.
