= Helen Foot Buell =

American botanist and ecologist (1902–1995)

- Born: December 22, 1901; Kalispell, Montana
- Died: February 21, 1995 (aged 93); Somerset, New Jersey
- Occupation: Botanist
- Spouse: Murray Fife Buell

Helen Foot Buell (December 22, 1901 – February 21, 1995) was an American botanist, algologist, ecologist, and editor.

== Early life and education ==
Helen Foot was born in Kalispell, Montana, the daughter of Charles Henry Foot and Theresa M. Polley Foot. Both of her parents were born in Minnesota; her father was a lawyer. She graduated from Flathead County High School, and completed a Ph.D. in Phycology at the University of Minnesota in 1938, funded in part with a fellowship from the American Association of University Women.

== Career ==
Helen Buell and her husband Murray Buell often worked as a team. They were fellow ecologists and often made publications together. She held an appointment as a teaching assistant at Rutgers University, where her husband was a professor.

== Personal life and legacy ==
Helen Foot married Murray Fife Buell in 1932, while they were graduate students in Minnesota. They had a son, Peter, and a daughter, Honor, both born in North Carolina. He died in 1975; she died in 1995, aged 93 years. After their death, their legacy lives on through the Murray and Helen Buell Scholarship in Ecology at Rutgers University. Housing at the Rutgers business school is also named for the Buells.

== Publications ==
Buell's publications include:

- Invasion of Trees in Secondary Succession on the New Jersey Piedmont - M. F. Buell, H. F. Buell, J. Small, Geography, 1 March 1971
- Aspen invasion of prairie - M. F. Buell, H. F. Buell, Environmental Science, 1 July 1959
- Radial Mat Growth on Cedar Creek Bog, Minnesota - M. F. Buell, H. F. Buell, W. Reiners, Biology, 1 November 1968
- Fire in the History of Mettler's Woods - M. F. Buell, H. F. Buell, J. Small, Geography, 1 May 1954
- Moat Bogs in the Itasca Park Area, Minnesota - M. F. Buell, H. F. Buell, Geography, 1975
- Drought Effect on Radial Growth of Trees in the William L. Hutcheson Memorial Forest - M. F. Buell, H. F. Buell, J. Small, C. Monk, Biology, 1 May 1961
- Closterium gracile Breb. (Desmidiaceae): a New Interpretation - H. F. Buell, Biology, 1 September 1968
- Reading the Landscape - H. F. Buell, M. T. Watts, Geography, 1 November 1957
