= Edith Clements =

American botanist (1877–1971)

- Born: Edith Gertrude Schwartz; 1874; Albany, New York
- Died: 1971 (aged 96–97)
- Other names: Edith S. Clements, Edith Schwartz Clements
- Education: University of Nebraska
- Occupations: Botanist, illustrator
- Spouse: Frederic Clements

Edith Gertrude Clements (1874–1971), also known as Edith S. Clements and Edith Schwartz Clements, was an American botanist and pioneer of botanical ecology who was the first woman to be awarded a Ph.D. by the University of Nebraska. She was married to botanist Frederic Clements, with whom she collaborated throughout her professional life. Together they founded the Alpine Laboratory, a research station at Pikes Peak, Colorado. Clements was also a botanical artist who illustrated her own books as well as joint publications with Frederic.

Both Clementses were involved with the study of phytogeography, especially those factors determining the ecology of vegetation in particular regions, and they would be praised as "the most illustrious husband-wife team since the Curies." It is impossible to entirely disentangle the work of each Clementses as they worked together during their noteworthy years.

== Early life and education ==
Edith Gertrude Schwartz was born in 1874 in Albany, New York, to George and Emma (Young) Schwartz. Her father was a pork packer from Omaha, Nebraska. She was educated at the University of Nebraska (NU), being elected to Phi Beta Kappa and gaining her A.B. in German in 1898. She was also a member of Kappa Alpha Theta. She wrote her dissertation on "The Relation of Leaf Structure to Physical Factors" in 1904.

Schwartz began her career as a teaching fellow in German at NU (1898–1900). During this period, she met her future husband, Frederic Clements, an NU botany professor who influenced the direction of her graduate studies. At the time, the Universities of Nebraska and Minnesota (where she would later teach) were centers for the study of phytogeography—the geographic distribution of plant species—and she chose to make this her area of specialization. She earned her doctoral degree in botany in 1904 (with a minor in Germanic philology and geology), becoming the first woman to be awarded a Ph.D. by NU.

Edith and Frederic married in 1899.

== Career ==
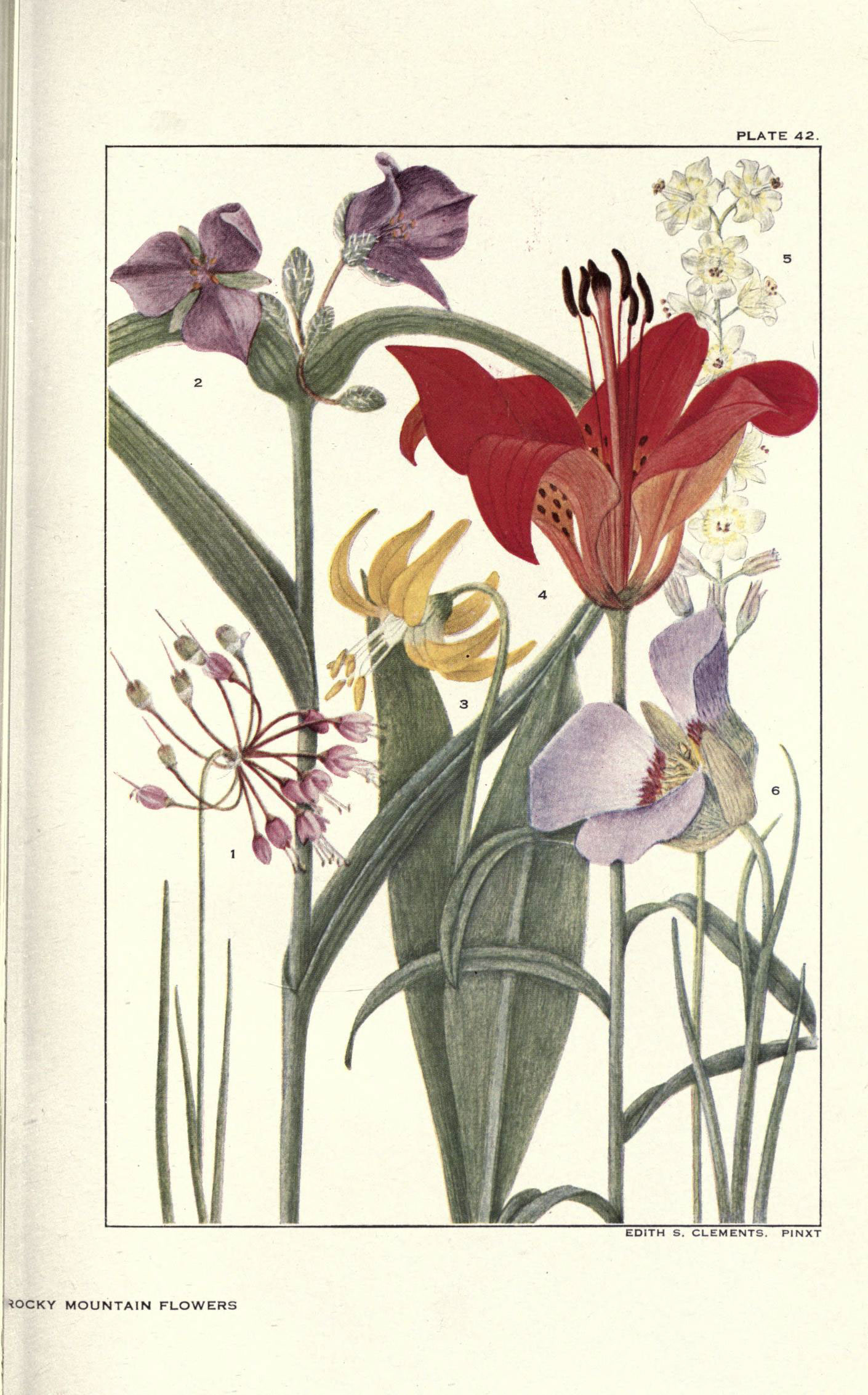
A Clements illustration for her book Rocky Mountain Flowers (Plate 42).

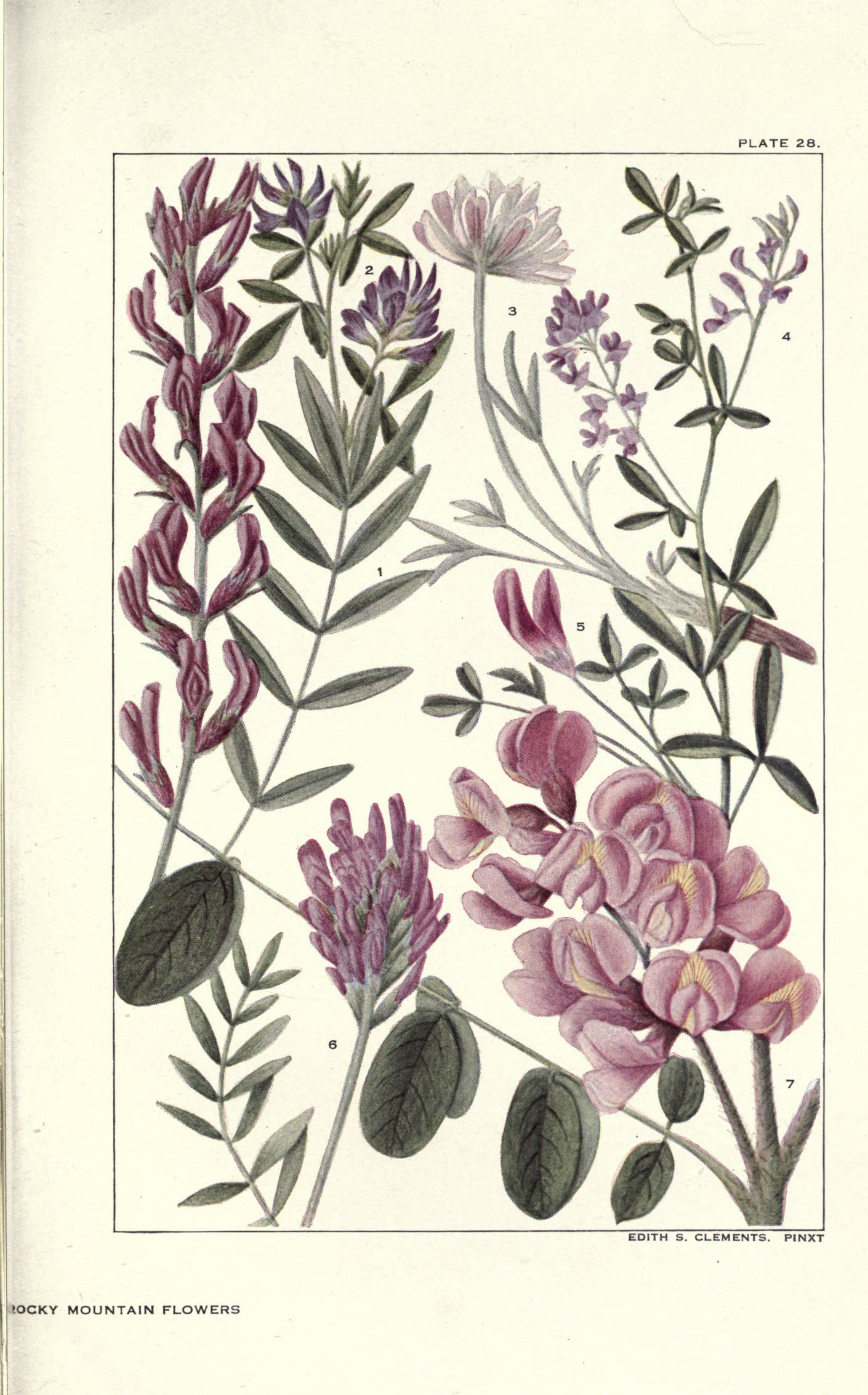
A Clements illustration for her book Rocky Mountain Flowers (Plate 28).

After gaining her Ph.D., Clements got a job as an assistant in botany at the University of Nevada (1904–07), where Frederic was teaching. To raise money, they spent several summers collecting plant specimens and assembled the Herbaria Formationum Coloradensium, a valuable collection of some 530 specimens of Colorado mountain plants carefully annotated and supplemented by 100 photographs. It was issued in 1903 in 24 sets that were sold to scientific institutions. A few years later, they assembled another exsiccata collection featuring some 615 specimens of cryptogams; this set was later (1972) issued in print form by the New York Botanical Garden.

In 1909, Clements was hired as an instructor in botany by the University of Minnesota, Minneapolis, where Frederic had been hired two years before to head up the botany department. In 1917, Frederic gave up teaching and began doing research funded by the Carnegie Institution of Washington, D.C. For many years thereafter, Carnegie Institution funding supported their joint research endeavors, and Clements was named a field assistant by the Carnegie Institution.

Beginning in 1917, the Clementses spent the winters doing research at two Carnegie-funded research institutions: first at the Tucson Institute in Arizona, and then (starting in 1925) at the Coastal Laboratory in Santa Barbara, California. Throughout this period, their summers were spent at a botanical station they developed as a test site for plant acclimatization, Alpine Laboratory at Pikes Peak, Colorado. Clements served as instructor in botany for the Alpine Laboratory, and Frederic as director. They trained many botanists and ecologists at this lab during its four decades of activity, before it closed in 1940. They published jointly and individually, and Clements used her language skills to translate some of their books and articles into foreign languages.

During the Dust Bowl years, Clements and Frederic drove around the Great Plains and Southwest, helping to encourage conservation measures to counter the destructive loss of farm and range land.

Clements was a botanical artist and illustrated a number of their joint publications, such as Rocky Mountain Flowers (1914) and Flowers of Coast and Sierra (1928), as well as solo publications by Frederic, including Plant Succession (1916, which she also helped to compile), Adaptation and Origin in the Plant World: The Role of Environment in Evolution (1939), and Dynamics of Vegetation (1949). In 1916, the color plates from Rocky Mountain Flowers were issued as a stand-alone guidebook to 175 of the most striking flowers of the area under the title Flowers of Mountain and Plain. The novelist Willa Cather, an acute observer of nature and a friend of the Clementses, was a great admirer of their work. In a 1921 interview, Cather observed: "There is one book that I would rather have produced than all my novels. That is the Clements botany dealing with the wildflowers of the west" (by which she probably means Rocky Mountain Flowers).

In 1960, at the age of eighty-six, Clements published a lively memoir, Adventures in Ecology: Half a Million Miles: From Mud to Macadam, in which she told the story of "two plant ecologists who lived and worked together." It is extremely revealing in showing how many jobs Clements undertook in support of the couple's joint expeditions, ranging from chauffeur, mechanic, cook, and stenographer to photographer, artist, and botanist. Indeed, Frederic himself was of the opinion that Clements would have been ranked among the world's top ecologists had she spent less time assisting his career.

Clements's wry style is evident in this account of the departure of one expedition:

Friendly neighbors stood around, offering advice, warnings and gloomy prophecies as well as bets on the impossibility of finding space in one car for the appalling number of things that seemed to be absolutely indispensable for the venture. I won the bets for I had a diagram that showed a 'place for everything' and finally I had 'everything in its place.' That is, everything except a pile of sugared and buttered pancakes, left from breakfast. Ginger had planned to have them for lunch, but there was absolutely not a vacant spot for them, and when he wasn't looking I put them on a shelf in the garage.

Frederic retired in 1941 and died in 1945. Edith continued to work on their joint manuscripts and write articles until her death in La Jolla in 1971.

== Legacy and honors ==
Clements was nominated for the Nebraska Hall of Fame in 2012.

An archive at the University of Wyoming, the Edith S. and Frederic E. Clements Papers, comprises photographs from the period 1893–1944, field notes, scientific correspondence, manuscripts and scientific papers, and Edith's diaries for the period 1907–1966. In addition, the University of Nebraska has digitized a small collection of letters written by Clements to her family about a 1911 trip she and Frederic took to Europe to participate in an international meeting of botanists and ecologists. Now available online, they are written with Clements's signature eye for vivid detail and knack for storytelling.

== Selected publications ==
=== Books ===
- Adventures in Ecology: Half a Million Miles: From Mud to Macadam (1960)
- Flowers of Coast and Sierra (1928)
- Flower Families and Ancestors (1928, with Frederic Clements)
- Flowers of Mountain and Plain (1916)
- Rocky Mountain Flowers (1914; with Frederic Clements)

=== Other writing ===
- "The Flower Pageant of the Midwest" (1939; with Frederic Clements)
- "The Relation of Leaf Structure to Physical Factors" (1905; Ph.D. dissertation) (free full text)

=== Collections ===
- Cryptogamae Formationum Coloradensium (1905–1908; with Frederic Clements; issued in print in 1972)
- Herbaria Formationum Coloradensium (1903; with Frederic Clements)
