= Madhusudan Katti =

Indian American environmental scientist

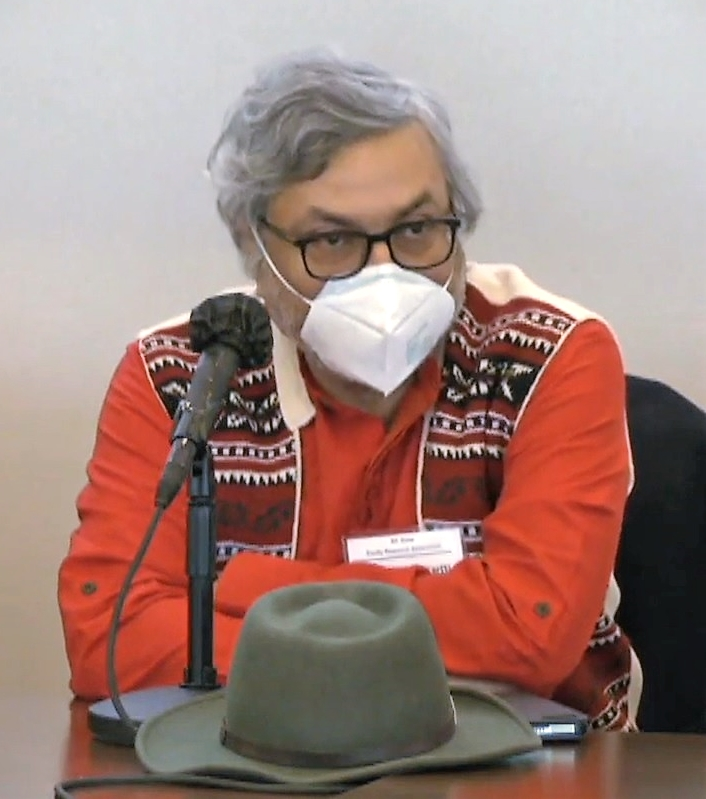
- Katti at a NCSU panel in 2022
- Education: University of California, San Diego; The Institute of Science, Mumbai; Wildlife Institute of India
- Scientific career
- Thesis: Ecology and evolution of non-breeding distributions in the Old World leaf warblers (1997)

Madhusudan Katti is an Indian American environmental scientist who is an Associate Professor of Ecology at the North Carolina State University. His research studies the evolutionary ecology of vertebrate response to human modifications of habitats.

== Early life and education ==
Katti was born in India. He attended The Institute of Science, Mumbai, where he graduated with a bachelor's degree in zoology in 1987. During his undergraduate degree, he became interested in wildlife and birdsong. He joined the Wildlife Institute of India as a graduate student, where he studied wildlife sciences. He moved to the United States for graduate studies and majored in biology. His doctoral research considered the ecology and evolution of leaf warblers in the Great Himalayas. After earning his doctorate, he was made a reconciliation ecologist.

== Research and career ==
In 2016, Katti joined North Carolina State University as the Chancellor's Faculty Excellence Program hire in Leadership in Public Science. His research considers animals and plants in urban environments, with a focus on improving biodiversity amongst human inhabited communities. He has also studied how humans impact animal behavior, for example, how urban noise impacts birdsong. Katti leads the Urban Long-Term research Area – Fresno And Clovis Ecosocial Study (ULTRA-FACES) project, which evaluates how human water use, water policy and urban biodiversity impact one another in the Central Valley in California.

Katti has explored ways to decolonize ecological research. He proposed that efforts to decolonize ecology would involve individual reflection, considering the varied ways of knowing and communicating science, understanding histories, decolonizing access to and expertise in science and practising ecology in ethical inclusive teams.

In 2022, Katti was announced as the executive editor of the Bulletin of the Ecological Society of America.

== Selected publications ==
- Myla F J Aronson; Frank A La Sorte; Charles H Nilon; et al. (12 February 2014). "A global analysis of the impacts of urbanization on bird and plant diversity reveals key anthropogenic drivers". Proceedings of the Royal Society B. 281 (1780) 20133330. doi:10.1098/RSPB.2013.3330. ISSN 0962-8452. PMC 4027400. PMID 24523278.
- Kinzig, Ann P.; Warren, Paige; Martin, Chris; Hope, Diane; Katti, Madhusudan (2005). "The Effects of Human Socioeconomic Status and Cultural Characteristics on Urban Patterns of Biodiversity". Ecology and Society. 10 (1) art23. doi:10.5751/es-01264-100123. hdl:10535/2944. ISSN 1708-3087.]
- Warren, Paige S.; Katti, Madhusudan; Ermann, Michael; Brazel, Anthony (March 2006). "Urban bioacoustics: it's not just noise". Animal Behaviour. 71 (3): 491–502. doi:10.1016/j.anbehav.2005.07.014. ISSN 0003-3472. S2CID 53154343.
