= Henry Chandler Cowles =

American botanist and ecological pioneer (1869–1939)

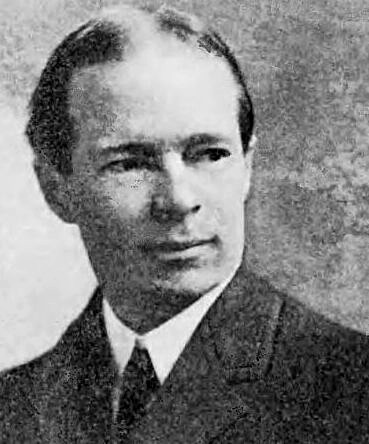
- Born: February 27, 1869; Kensington, Connecticut, US
- Died: September 12, 1939 (aged 70)
- Education: University of Chicago; Oberlin College
- Known for: Ecological succession
- Spouse: Elizabeth Waller
- Children: Harriet
- Scientific career
- Fields: Botany
- Workplaces: University of Chicago
- Thesis: The Ecological Relations of the Vegetation on the Sand Dunes of Lake Michigan (1898)
- Doctoral advisor: John Merle Coulter
- Doctoral students: Victor Ernest Shelford; William Skinner Cooper; Paul Sears

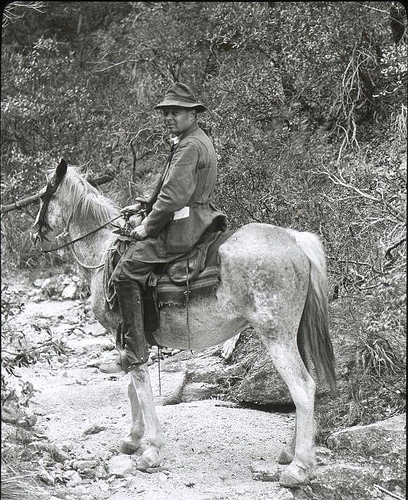
Henry C. Cowles in the Santa Catalina Mountains, Arizona, 1913

Henry Chandler Cowles (February 27, 1869 – September 12, 1939) was an American botanist and ecological pioneer. A professor at the University of Chicago, he studied ecological succession in the Indiana Dunes of Northwest Indiana. This led to efforts to preserve the Indiana Dunes. One of Cowles' students, O. D. Frank continued his research.

== Life and work ==
Cowles was born in Kensington, Connecticut, the son of the farmer Henry M. Cowles (1831–1915) and Eliza Cowles (née Whittlesey, 1839–1888). He attended Oberlin College in Ohio. He studied at the University of Chicago with the plant taxonomist John M. Coulter and the geologist Thomas Chrowder Chamberlin as main teachers. He obtained his PhD in 1898 for his study of vegetation succession on the Lake Michigan sand dunes. The inspiration to these studies came from reading Plantesamfund by the Danish botanist and pioneer ecologist Eugen Warming. Cowles studied Danish to be able to read the original and later (1905) visited Warming in Copenhagen. The translation of Warming's term into English as "Oecology" led to Cowles becoming one of the primary popularizers of the term ecology in the United States. Cowles was one of the founding members of the Ecological Society of America in 1915.

Cowles married Elizabeth Waller in 1900, and their daughter Harriet was born in 1912.

== Legacy ==
One of Cowles's field study locations is now named Cowles Bog in his honor; Cowles Bog and nearby dune locations were later preserved for the public as part of the Indiana Dunes National Lakeshore (national park as of February 2019). Cowles Bog is located west of Mineral Springs Road in the Town of Dune Acres, Indiana.

Among Cowles's students who advanced American ecology were Victor E. Shelford, William Skinner Cooper, Paul B. Sears, George Damon Fuller, Walter P. Cottam, Arthur G. Vestal and May Theilgaard Watts. Cowles also served as a special field assistant of the United States Geological Survey.

== Works ==
His publications include:

- Ecological Relations of the Vegetation on the Sand Dunes of Lake Michigan (1899)
- Text-Book of Botany, Volume II: Ecology (1910) (with John Merle Coulter (Volume I, Part I: Morphology) and Charles Reid Barnes (Volume I, Part II: Physiology)
- Plant Societies of Chicago and Vicinity (1901)

== See also ==
- Frederic Clements
