= Thomas Park (ecologist) =

Thomas Park (November 17, 1908 – March 30, 1992) was an American zoologist, recognized for transforming the field of ecology into a science with quantification and controlled experiments. He was a professor at the University of Chicago and served in 1960 as President of the American Association for the Advancement of Science.

Park was born in Danville, Illinois, and was raised there, in Ocean Springs, Mississippi, and in Chicago. He attended the University of Chicago, earning a bachelor's degree in 1930 and a doctorate in zoology in 1932.

Moving first, from 1933 to 1937 to Johns Hopkins University, he returned to the University of Chicago as a professor, rising to associate dean of its Biological Sciences Division from 1943 to 1946. He studied on a Rockefeller fellowship at Oxford University in 1948 and served briefly as a scientific attache in the United States Embassy in London in 1949. Returning to the University of Chicago, he remained until his retirement in 1974.

Park's research was on beetles. Experimentally, he competed two species of flour beetles in test tubes containing flour, yeast and water, with different temperatures and humidity. Inevitably, one species dominated the other, which became extinct.

Park was married 35 years to the former Martha Alden Whitehead, who died in 1963. In 1969 he married Frances Lear.
