= William Skinner Cooper =

American ecologist

William Skinner Cooper (25 August 1884 – 8 October 1978) was an American ecologist. Cooper received his B.S. in 1906 from Alma College in Michigan. In 1909, he entered graduate school at the University of Chicago, where he studied with Henry Chandler Cowles, and completed his Ph.D. in 1911. His first major publication, "The Climax Forest of Isle Royale, Lake Superior, and Its Development" appeared in 1913.

== Career ==
Cooper served briefly in 1914-1915 as a lecturer in plant ecology at Stanford University before beginning his long career in the botany department at the University of Minnesota, where he taught from 1915 to 1951. Among his students at Minnesota were Henry J. Oosting, Murray Fife Buell, Rexford F. Daubenmire, Frank Edwin Egler and Arnold M. Schultz; the latter went on to teach "Ecosystemology" at U.C. Berkeley, and received U.C. Berkeley's "Distinguished Teaching Award" in 1992. Cooper was the president of the Ecological Society of America in 1936 and the president of the Minnesota Academy of Science in 1937. Other professional accolades included receipt of the Botanical Society of America's Merit Award in 1956 and the Eminent Ecologist Award from the Ecological Society of America in 1963.

Cooper's travels in Glacier Bay, Alaska, compelled him to lead scientists in nominating it as a national park or monument. He also established the oldest permanent plot network in post-glacial areas in the world in 1916 in the Glacier Bay basin, now maintained by Brian Buma at the University of Colorado. At the Ecological Society of America's 1922 meeting, Cooper headed a committee that drafted a resolution adopted by the organization and sent to President Calvin Coolidge asking him to name the bay a monument. His 1935 monograph on the late glacial and postglacial environment of the Glacier Bay Basin is considered a classic. Mount Cooper in Glacier Bay is named in his honor.

The Ecological Society of America recognizes Cooper's work in the discipline by bestowing its annual William Skinner Cooper Award on scientists who produce outstanding publications on geobotany, physiographic ecology, plant succession, or the distribution of plants along environmental gradients.

== Selected works ==
- William S. Cooper, "The Climax Forest of Isle Royale, Lake Superior, and Its Development. I," Botanical Gazette 55 (1913): 1-44; Part II, 115–140; Part III, 189–235
- William Skinner Cooper, "The Recent Ecological History of Glacier Bay, Alaska" Ecology 4 (1923): 93–128.
- William Skinner Cooper, The History of the Upper Mississippi River in Late Wisconsin and Postglacial Time (Minneapolis: University of Minnesota Press, 1935).
