= Ecology (journal) =

- Discipline: Ecology
- Language: English
- Edited by: Donald R. Strong (Editor-in-Chief); Kathryn L. Cottingham (from January 1, 2020)

Publication details
- Former name: Plant World
- History: 1920 to present
- Publisher: Ecological Society of America (USA)
- Frequency: 12/year (2000–present); 8/year (1993–1999); 6/year (1969–1992); 4/year (1920–1968)
- License: non-free
- Impact factor: 5.175 (2012)

Standard abbreviations
- ISO 4: Ecology

Indexing
- ISSN: 0012-9658
- LCCN: sn97-23010
- JSTOR: 00129658
- OCLC no.: 35698209

Links
- Journal homepage

Ecology is a scientific journal that publishes research and synthesizes papers in the field of ecology. It was founded in 1920 as the continuation of Plant World, and is published by the Ecological Society of America. According to the Journal Citation Reports, it is currently ranked 15th out of 136 journals in the Ecology category.
