= Frederic Clements =

American plant ecologist (1874–1945)

Frederic Edward Clements
- Born: September 16, 1874; Lincoln, Nebraska, United States
- Died: July 26, 1945 (aged 70); Santa Barbara, California
- Education: University of Nebraska
- Known for: Ecological succession
- Spouse: Edith Gertrude Schwartz
- Scientific career
- Fields: Plant ecology
- Workplaces: University of Nebraska; University of Minnesota; Carnegie Institution of Science
- Author abbrev. (botany): Clem.

Frederic Edward Clements (September 16, 1874 – July 26, 1945) was an American plant ecologist and pioneer in the study of both plant ecology and vegetation succession.

== Biography ==
Born in Lincoln, Nebraska, he studied botany at the University of Nebraska, graduating in 1894 and obtaining a doctorate in 1898. One of his teachers was botanist Charles Bessey, who inspired Clements to research topics such as microscopy, plant physiology, and laboratory experimentation. He was also classmate of Willa Cather and Roscoe Pound. While at the University of Nebraska, he met Edith Gertrude Schwartz (1874–1971), also a botanist and ecologist, and they were married in 1899.

In 1905 he was appointed full professor at the University of Nebraska, but left in 1907 to head the botany department at the University of Minnesota in Minneapolis. From 1917 to 1941 he was employed as an ecologist at the Carnegie Institution of Washington in Washington, D.C., where he was able to carry out dedicated ecological research. While employed at Carnegie Institution of Washington, Clements faced criticism for his experiments conducted with the purpose of creating new plant species. Due to these criticisms and as well as personal conflicts with his co workers, in the 1920s the title of director of research in experimental taxonomy was given to Harvey Monroe Hall.

During winter he worked at research stations in Tucson, Arizona, and Santa Barbara, California, while in the summer he performed fieldwork at the Carnegie Institution's Alpine Laboratory, a research station in Englemann Canyon on the slopes of Pikes Peak, Colorado. During this time he worked alongside staff of the U.S. Soil Conservation Service. In addition to his field investigations, he carried out experimental work in the laboratory and greenhouse, both at the Pikes Peak station and at Santa Barbara.

== Theory of vegetation change to climax community ==
From his observations of the vegetation of Nebraska and the western United States, Clements developed one of the most influential theories of vegetation development. Vegetation composition does not represent a permanent condition but gradually changes with time. Clements suggested that the development of vegetation can be understood as a unidirectional sequence of stages resembling the development of an individual organism. After a complete or partial disturbance, vegetation grows back (under ideal conditions) towards a stable "climax state", which describes the vegetation best suited to the local conditions. Though any actual instance of vegetation might follow the ideal sequence towards stability, it can be interpreted in relation to that sequence, as a deviation from it due to non-ideal conditions.

In these studies, he and Roscoe Pound (who subsequently moved from ecology to legal scholarship) developed the widely-used method of sampling using quadrats around 1898.

Clements's climax theory of vegetation dominated plant ecology during the first decades of the twentieth century, though it was criticized significantly by ecologists William Skinner Cooper, Henry Gleason and Arthur Tansley early on, and by Robert Whittaker mid-century, and largely fell out of favor.

== Community-unit view of vegetation types or plant communities ==
In his 1916 publication, Plant Succession, and his 1920 Plant Indicators, Clements metaphorically equated units of vegetation, (now called vegetation types or plant communities) with individual organisms. He observed that some groups of species, which he called "formations", were repeatedly associated together. He is frequently said to have believed that some species were dependent on the group, and the group on that species in an obligatory relationship. However, this interpretation has been challenged by the argument that Clements did not assume mutual dependence as an organizing principle of formations or plant communities. Clements observed little overlap in kinds of species from type to type, with many species confined to just a single type. Some plants were widespread over vegetation types, but the areas of geographical overlap (ecotones) was narrow. His view of a community as a distinct unit was challenged in 1926 by Henry Gleason, who viewed vegetation as a continuum, not a unit, with associations being merely coincidental, and that any support by observations or data of clusters of species as predicted by Clements's view was either an artifact of the observer's perception or a result of defective data analysis.

== Lamarckism ==
Clements was an advocate of neo-Lamarckian evolution. Ecologist Arthur Tansley wrote that because of his support for Lamarckism, Clements "never seemed to give proper weight to the results of modern genetical research."

Science historian Ronald C. Tobey has commented that:

[Clements] believed that plants and animals could acquire a wide variety and range of characteristics in their struggle to survive and adapt to their environment, and that these features were heritable. In the 1920s, he conducted experiments to transform plant species native to one ecological zone into a species adapted to another, higher, zone. Clements was quite convinced of the validity of his experiments, but this experimental Lamarckism fell to experimental disproof in the 1930s.

Clements spent much time trying to demonstrate the inheritance of acquired traits in plants. By the late 1930s scientists had provided Darwinian explanations for the results of his transplant experiments.

== Honors ==
In 1903, the flower Clementsia rhodantha Rhodiola rhodantha ("Clements's rose flower"), a stonecrop, was named in honor of Frederic Clements.

== Writings ==
Among his works are:

- The Phytogeography of Nebraska (1898; second edition, 1900)
- Research Methods in Ecology (1905)
- Plant Physiology and Ecology (1907)
- Plant Succession. An Analysis of the Development of Vegetation (1916)
- Plant Indicators. The Relation of Plant Communities to Process and Practice (1920)
- The Phylogenetic Method in Taxonomy: The North American Species of Artemisia, Chrysothamnus, and Atriplex (1923, with Harvey Monroe Hall)
- Plant Succession and Indicators. A definitive edition of Plant succession and Plant indicators (1928, reprinted 1973)
- Flower Families and Ancestors (1928, with Edith Clements)
- Plant Competition. An Analysis of Community Functions (1929, with J.E. Weaver & H.C. Hanson. Washington: Carnegie Institution of Washington
- The Genera of Fungi (1931, repr. 1965, with C. L. Shear)
- Nature and structure of the climax (1936). The Journal of Ecology, 24(1), 252–284.

Together with his wife Edith Clements he edited three exsiccata works.

== See also ==
- Category:Taxa named by Frederic Clements
- Suzanne Simard
