= Murray Fife Buell =

American ecologist and palynologist

Murray Fife Buell (October 5, 1905 – July 3, 1975) was an American ecologist and palynologist.

== Personal life ==
Born in New Haven, Connecticut, Buell earned a B.S. at Cornell University in 1930. He then attended the University of Minnesota, where he earned a M.A. in 1934 and a Ph.D. in 1935. After completing his Ph.D., Buell's studies with W.S. Cooper stimulated his interest in plant ecology.

During graduate school, Buell married Helen Foot (Ph.D., Algology, U. Minn.); the Buells raised two children. Helen was his field companion as well as his wife, and the two worked as a team in research and publication of several papers.

Buell began his professional career at North Carolina State University in 1935, where he started his research on paleoecology of bogs and plant succession.

From 1947 until his retirement in 1971, Buell taught at Rutgers University, where he became professor of botany and served as director of the William Hutcheson Forest. As early as 1955, he and his students studied ecology in relation to land-use management and human impacts, especially in parklands.

In 1962, he served as president of the Ecological Society of America (ESA), and was given the Eminent Ecologist Award by the society in 1970. The Murray F. Buell Award was established by ESA in 1977.

Buell died July 3, 1975, while on a field trip to the New Jersey Pine Barrens.

== Career chronology ==
- 1935 Instructor, Assistant Professor, North Carolina State University
- 1937–1959 University of Minnesota Biological Station (summers)
- 1946 Assistant Professor, Rutgers University
- 1956–1971 Professor in Botany Department, Rutgers University
- 1970 Eminent Ecologist Award by the Ecological Society of America

== Selected papers ==
- Buell, M.F. 1939. Peat formation in the Carolina Bays. Bull. Torrey Bot. Club 66:483–487.
- Buell, M.F. 1945. Late Pleistocene forest of southeastern North Carolina. Torreya 45:117–118.
- Buell, M.F. 1970. Time of origin of New Jersey Pine Barrens bogs. Bull. Torrey Bot. Club 97:105–108.

== Bibliography ==
The following books were written by Murray F. Buell:

- Vegetative Key to the Woody Plants of Itasca State Park, Minnesota (1968), with Robert L. Cain
- Vegetation of New Jersey (1973), with Beryl Robichaud

== See also ==
- Cornell University
- University of Minnesota
- North Carolina State University
- Rutgers University
- Ecological Society of America
- Helen Foot Buell
