= Ecological Society of America =

Ecological professional association

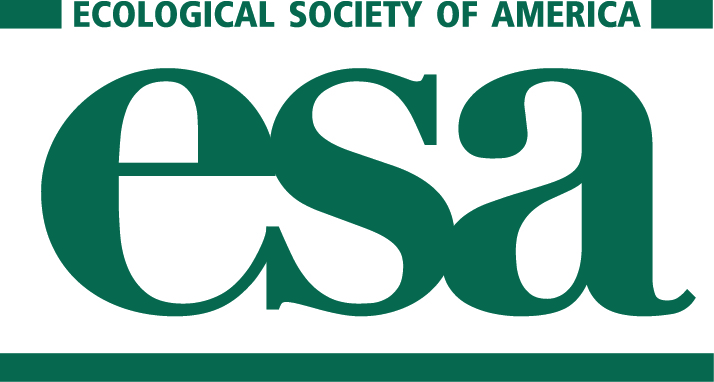
- Logo for the Ecological Society of America
- Abbreviation: ESA
- Formation: December 28, 1915; 110 years ago
- Founded at: Columbus, Ohio
- Type: 501(c)(3) not-for-profit membership corporation
- Legal status: non profit
- Headquarters: Washington, DC
- Location: US
- Region served: North America
- Products: peer-reviewed journals, newsletters, fact sheets, and teaching resources
- Services: Membership, Meetings, Networking, Professional Career Training, Educational Support, and Financial Awards
- Members: 9,000
- Official language: English
- Executive Director: Catherine O'Riordan
- Chief Financial Officer: Elizabeth Biggs
- Director of Public Affairs: Alison Mize
- Director of Science Programs: Adrienne Sponberg
- Key people: Elizabeth Biggs, Katherine S. McCarter
- Main organ: Governing Board, Various Standing Committees
- Subsidiaries: Agroecology Applied Ecology Aquatic Ecology Asian Ecology Biogeosciences Black Ecologists Communication and Engagement Disease Ecology Early Career Ecologists Ecological Restoration Education Environmental Justice Human Ecology Inclusive Ecology Invasion Ecology Long-term Studies Microbial Ecology Natural History Open Science Paleoecology Physiological Ecology Plant Population Ecology Policy Rangeland Ecology Researchers at Undergraduate Institutions Soil Ecology Statistical Ecology Student Section Theoretical Ecology Traditional Ecological Knowledge Urban Ecosystem Ecology Vegetation
- Staff: 32 (2020)
- Volunteers: Hundreds (2020)
- Website: www.esa.org

The Ecological Society of America (ESA) is a professional organization of ecological scientists. Based in the United States and founded in 1915, ESA publications include peer-reviewed journals, newsletters, fact sheets, and teaching resources. It holds an annual meeting at different locations in the USA and Canada. In addition to its publications and annual meeting, ESA is engaged in public policy, science, education, and diversity issues.

ESA's 9,000 members are researchers, educators, natural resource managers, and students in over 90 countries. Members work on a wide range of topics, from agroecology to marine diversity, and explore the relationships between organisms and their past, present, and future environments. As of June 2023 the society has 32 topical sections, six regional chapters, and ten committees.

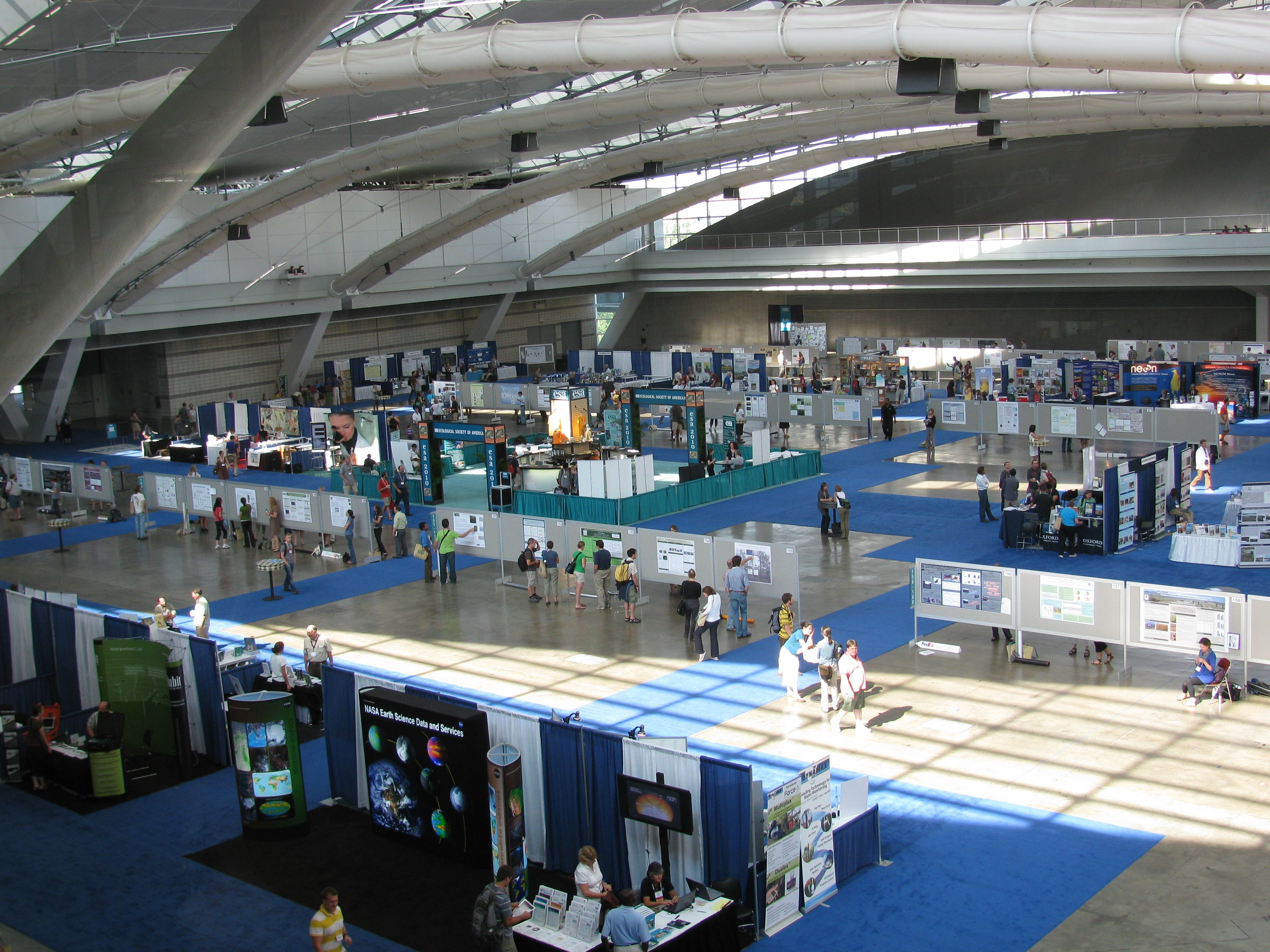
Annual Meeting of the Ecological Society of America

== History ==
The first discussions on the formation of the society took place in 1914 in the lobby of the Hotel Walton in Philadelphia, Pennsylvania, at a meeting of animal and plant ecologists organized by Henry Chandler Cowles. On December 28, 1915, in Columbus, Ohio, at the meeting of the American Association for the Advancement of Science, a group of about 50 people voted to form the Ecological Society of America, adopted a constitution, and set the next meeting. Dr. Victor E. Shelford of the University of Illinois served as the first president.

The society was founded to unify the science of ecology, stimulate research in all aspects of the discipline, encourage communication among ecologists, and promote the responsible application of ecological data and principles to the solution of environmental problems. The society has grown to 10,000 members worldwide.

In the 1940s, the society decided that it should focus on research and not pursue an activist or political focus on ecological preservation, leading Shelford to found what became The Nature Conservancy.

== Divisions ==
The Public Affairs Office works to engage in environmental and science policy, share ecological science with the media and the public, and inform the ecological community about opportunities to participate in public policy or media interactions. ESA's Rapid Response Team experts play a key role in these activities, serving as a resource for ESA, policymakers, and the media.

The Science Programs Office promotes the continued development of ecological science and its integration into decision-making and education, linking the ecological research and management communities.

The Education and Diversity Programs Office works to increase diversity within ecology-related professions, to engage the public in a dialogue on ecological research and issues, and to improve the quality of ecology education at all levels.

ESA Journals – The society publishes the scientific, peer-reviewed journals Ecology, Ecological Monographs, Ecological Applications, Frontiers in Ecology and the Environment, and most recently added, Ecosphere. Madhusudan Katti is the Executive Editor of the quarterly Bulletin of the Ecological Society of America. Among others, research featured in ESA's journals has included articles on white-nose syndrome in bats, marine protected areas, migration systems of New World birds, the indirect ecological effects between parasitoid wasps and rhizobacteria, and the range expansion of cougars.

== Online communications ==
=== Blog ===
EcoTone is a blog produced by the Ecological Society of America. The blog showcases ecology and ecologists, focusing on ecological science in the news and its use in policy and education. EcoTone welcomes guest submissions and suggestions of timely, relevant news of importance to the broad ecological community.

=== Podcasts ===
Beyond the Frontier – features interviews with the authors of selected articles appearing in recent print issues of the ESA journal Frontiers in Ecology and the Environment. Beyond the Frontier also aspires to make the subject matter accessible and interesting to listeners from a variety of scientific disciplines and to non-specialists as well. Listeners are encouraged to continue the discussion online, using the "add comment" functionality underneath each podcast to post their thoughts and ideas.

The Ecologist Goes to Washington – features the stories and reflections of scientists who have engaged their local, state, or federal governments in addressing the broader implications of their research.

Field Talk – features the field experiences of ecologists including interviews exploring the work of those who have published in the society's journals.

== Membership ==
Membership of this society consists of persons and institutions interested in ecology and in the promotion of ecological research. The following classes of members are recognized: Regular members, Student members, Life members, Emeritus members, and Institutional members.

=== Officers and elections ===
The officers are the president, the vice president for science, the vice president for public affairs, the vice president for finance, the vice president for education and human resources, and the secretary. The president serves consecutive one-year terms as president-elect, president, and past president. A member may hold the office of president for only one term, in addition to such time as may be served to fill the office following the death or resignation of a president.

The vice presidents and the secretary serve three-year terms and are eligible for reelection for up to one additional term. The terms of the vice presidents and the secretary shall be overlapping so that no more than two of these officers shall normally be elected in any given year.

The officers and other positions filled by society elections are selected by electronic ballot. The official terms of the officers commence with the close of the annual meeting and continue until their successors assume office. Only Regular, Student, and Life members are eligible to hold office in the society. No employee or member of the immediate family of an employee of the society may be nominated for or hold elected office within the society.

=== Governing board ===
The governing board consists of the president, the president-elect, the past president, the four vice presidents, the secretary, and three members-at-large. The three members-at-large are elected by the voting membership for two-year terms, with generally no more than two being elected in any one year.

The president chairs the governing board and the council and presides at their meetings. In the president's absence, the president-elect presides; if the president-elect is also not present, the past president presides, and if the past president is also not present, the governing board shall elect a chair from among those members of the governing board who are present.

== ESA Awards ==
ESA presents several awards as recognition of the efforts and achievements of the community.

- Commitment to Human Diversity in Ecology Award (inception 2010)
- Distinguished Service Citation (inception 1975)
- Eminent Ecologist Award (inception 1953)
- ESA Early Career Fellow
- ESA Fellow
- Eugene P. Odum Award for Excellence in Ecology Education (inception 2000)
- Forrest Shreve Award
- George Mercer Award (inception 1948)
- International Ecology Award (inception 2015)
- Murray F. Buell Award for Excellence in Ecology (inception 1977)
- Lucy Braun Award for Excellence in Ecology (inception 1988)
- Robert H. MacArthur Award (inception 1983)
- Robert H. Whittaker Distinguished Ecologist Award (inception 2014)
- Sustainability Science Award (inception 2004)
- W.S. Cooper Award (inception 1985)

Additional awards are presented by the chapters and sections.

== See also ==
- Conservation biology
- Conservation movement
- Ecology
- Ecology movement
- Environmental movement
- Environmental protection
- Scientific societies
