= List of ecologists =

This is a list of notable ecologists.

== A-D ==
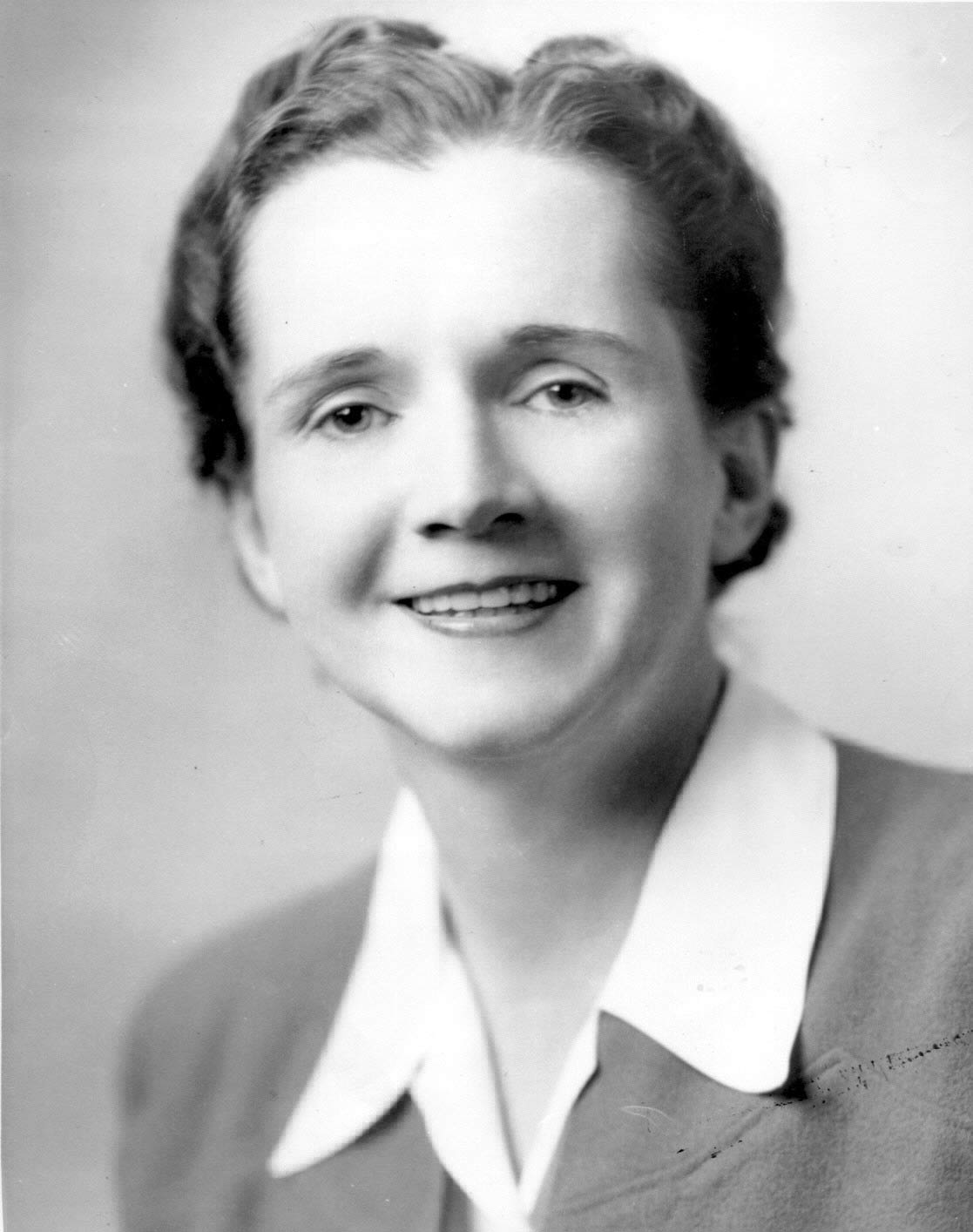
Rachel Carson

- John Aber (United States)
- Aziz Ab'Saber (Brazil)
- Charles Christopher Adams (United States)
- Warder Clyde Allee (United States)
- Herbert G. Andrewartha (Australia)
- Sarah Martha Baker (UK)
- Fakhri A. Bazzaz (United States)
- John Beard (UK)
- William Dwight Billings (United States)
- Louis Charles Birch (Australia)
- Murray Bookchin (United States)
- George Bornemissza (Australia)
- Emma Lucy Braun (United States)
- James Brown (United States)
- Murray Fife Buell (United States)
- Arthur Cain (United States)
- Archie Fairly Carr (United States)
- Rachel Carson (United States)
- Jeannine Cavender-Bares (United States)
- F. Stuart Chapin III (United States)
- Eric Charnov (United States)
- Liz Chicaje (Peru)
- Frederic Clements (United States)
- Barry Commoner (United States)
- Henry Shoemaker Conard (United States)
- Joseph H. Connell (United States)
- William Skinner Cooper (United States)
- Charles F. Cooper (United States)
- Henry Chandler Cowles (United States)
- John T. Curtis (United States)
- Pierre Dansereau (Canada)
- Frank Fraser Darling (UK)
- Charles Darwin (England)
- Aparajita Datta (India)
- Margaret Bryan Davis (United States)
- Edward Smith Deevey, Jr. (United States)
- Rene Dubos (United States)

== E-H ==
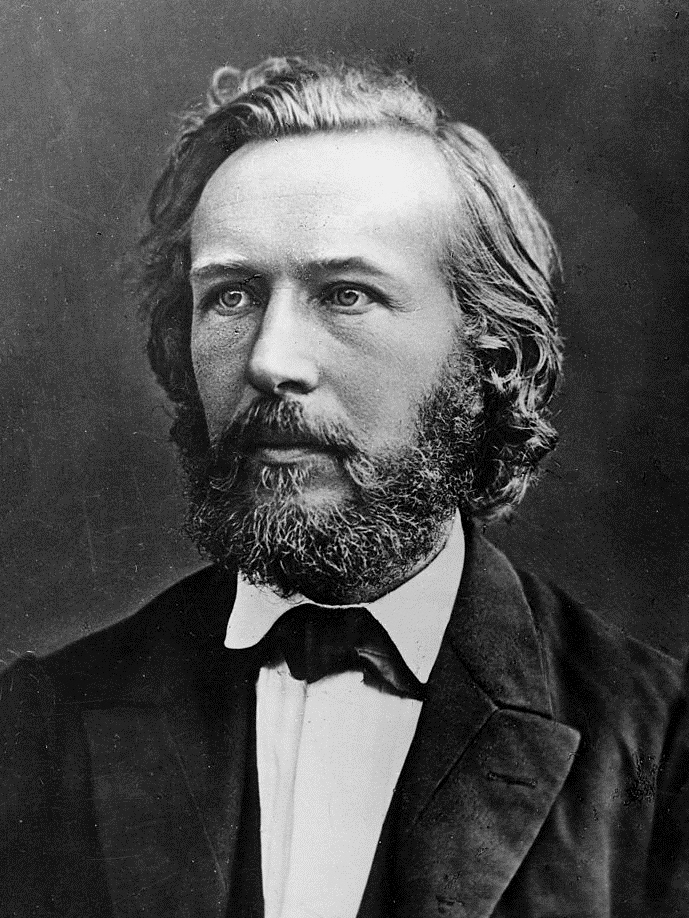
Ernst Haeckel

- Frank Edwin Egler (United States)
- Paul R. Ehrlich (United States)
- Thomas Eisner (United States)
- Heinz Ellenberg (Germany)
- Charles S. Elton (UK)
- Stephen Alfred Forbes (United States)
- Marie-Josée Fortin (Canada)
- Robin B. Foster (United States)
- Margaret Friedel (Australia)
- Douglas Futuyma (United States)
- Mauro Galetti (Brazil)
- David L. Gaveau (UK)
- Jacquelyn Gill (United States)
- Henry Gleason (United States)
- Robert Fiske Griggs (United States)
- J. Philip Grime (UK)
- Nancy Grimm (United States)
- Peter J. Grubb (UK)
- Ernst Haeckel (Germany)
- Nelson Hairston (United States)
- Henry Paul Hansen (United States)
- Ilkka Hanski (Finland)
- Garrett Hardin (United States)
- John L. Harper (UK)
- John William Harshberger (United States)
- Jeff Harvey (United States)
- Alan Hastings (United States)
- C.S. Holling (Canada)
- Stephen P. Hubbell (United States)
- Elisabeth Huber-Sannwald (Austria)
- Alexander von Humboldt (Prussia/Germany)
- G. Evelyn Hutchinson (UK/USA)

== I-L ==
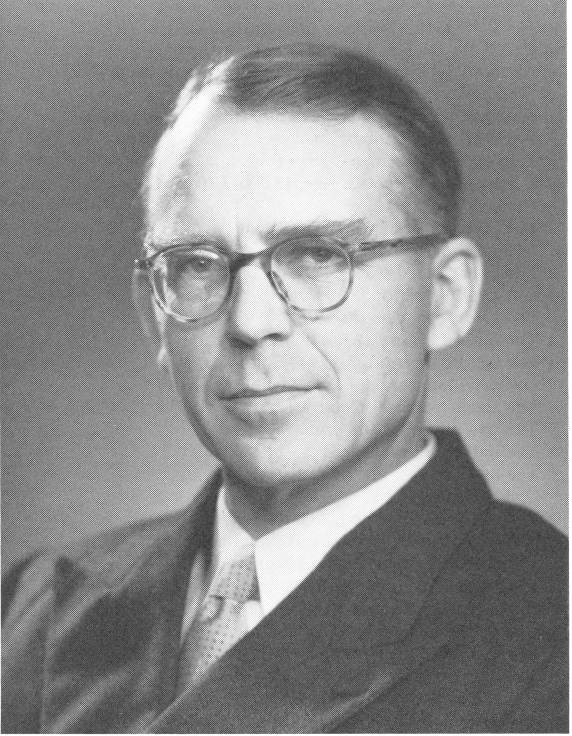
Johs. Iversen

- Rolf Anker Ims (Norway)
- Johs. Iversen (Denmark)
- Frances Crews James (United States)
- Daniel Janzen (United States)
- Edward A. Johnson (Canada)
- Rahanna Alicia Juman (Trinidad and Tobago)
- Paul Keddy (Canada)
- Hanna Kokko (Finland)
- Charles Krebs (Canada)
- David Lack (UK)
- Hugh Lamprey (UK)
- Pierre Legendre (Canada)
- Aldo Leopold (United States)
- Estella Leopold (United States)
- Simon A. Levin (United States)
- Richard Levins (United States)
- Gene Likens (United States)
- Raymond Lindeman (United States)
- Alton A. Lindsey (United States)
- Daniel A. Livingstone (United States)
- Julie L. Lockwood (United States)
- Thomas Lovejoy (United States)
- James Lovelock (UK)
- Jane Lubchenco (United States)

== M-P ==
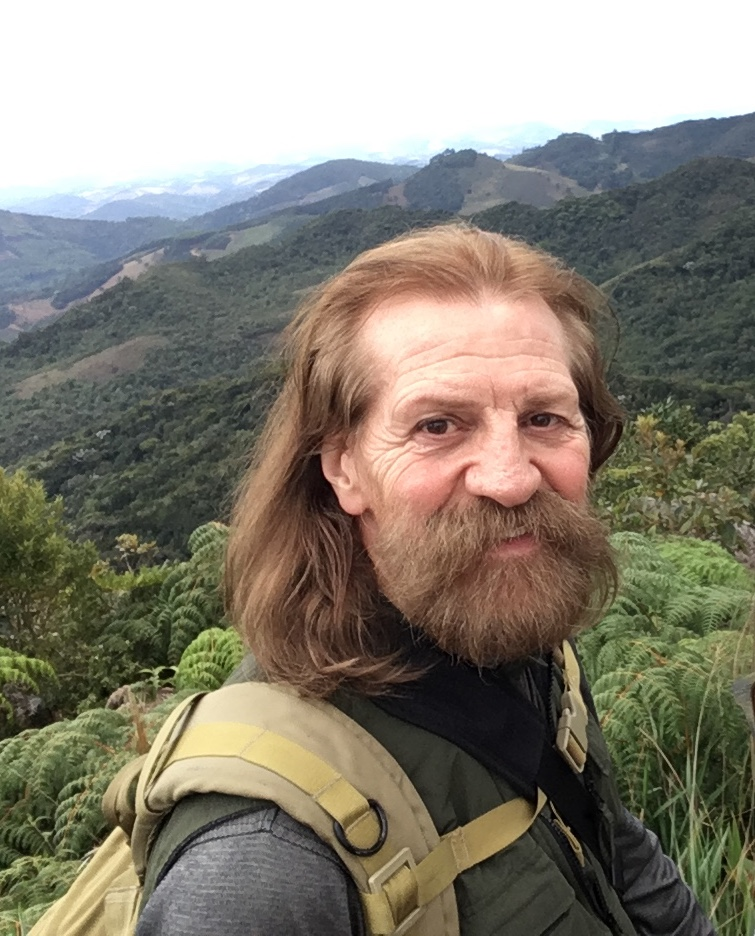
Sergio Rossetti Morosini

- Robert MacArthur (United States)
- Georgina Mace (UK)
- Michael Marder (Spain)
- Ramon Margalef (Spain)
- Robert May (Australia/UK)
- James B. McGraw (United States)
- Nancy E. McIntyre (United States)
- Samuel Joseph McNaughton (United States)
- Ian McTaggart-Cowan (Canada)
- Antônia Melo (Brazil)
- Peter Menkhorst (Australia)
- John P. Milton (United States)
- Karl Möbius (Germany)
- Harold A. Mooney (United States)
- Ann Haven Morgan (United States)
- Timothy Morton (United States)
- Peter J. Morin (United States)
- Sergio Rossetti Morosini (Brazil-USA)
- Cornelius Muller (United States)
- William W. Murdoch (United States)
- Robert J. Naiman (United States)
- Howard Nelson (Trinidad and Tobago)
- Eugene Odum (United States)
- Howard Odum (United States)
- Henry J. Oosting (United States)
- Gordon Howell Orians (United States)
- Richard S. Ostfeld (United States)
- Jennifer Owen (UK)
- Ruth Patrick (United States)
- Stephanie Peay (UK)
- Carlos A. Peres (Brazil)
- Javier Perez-Capdevila (Cuba)
- Mario Petrucci (UK - Italy)
- E. C. Pielou (Canada)
- Frank Alois Pitelka (United States)
- Henry de Puyjalon (Canada)

== Q-T ==
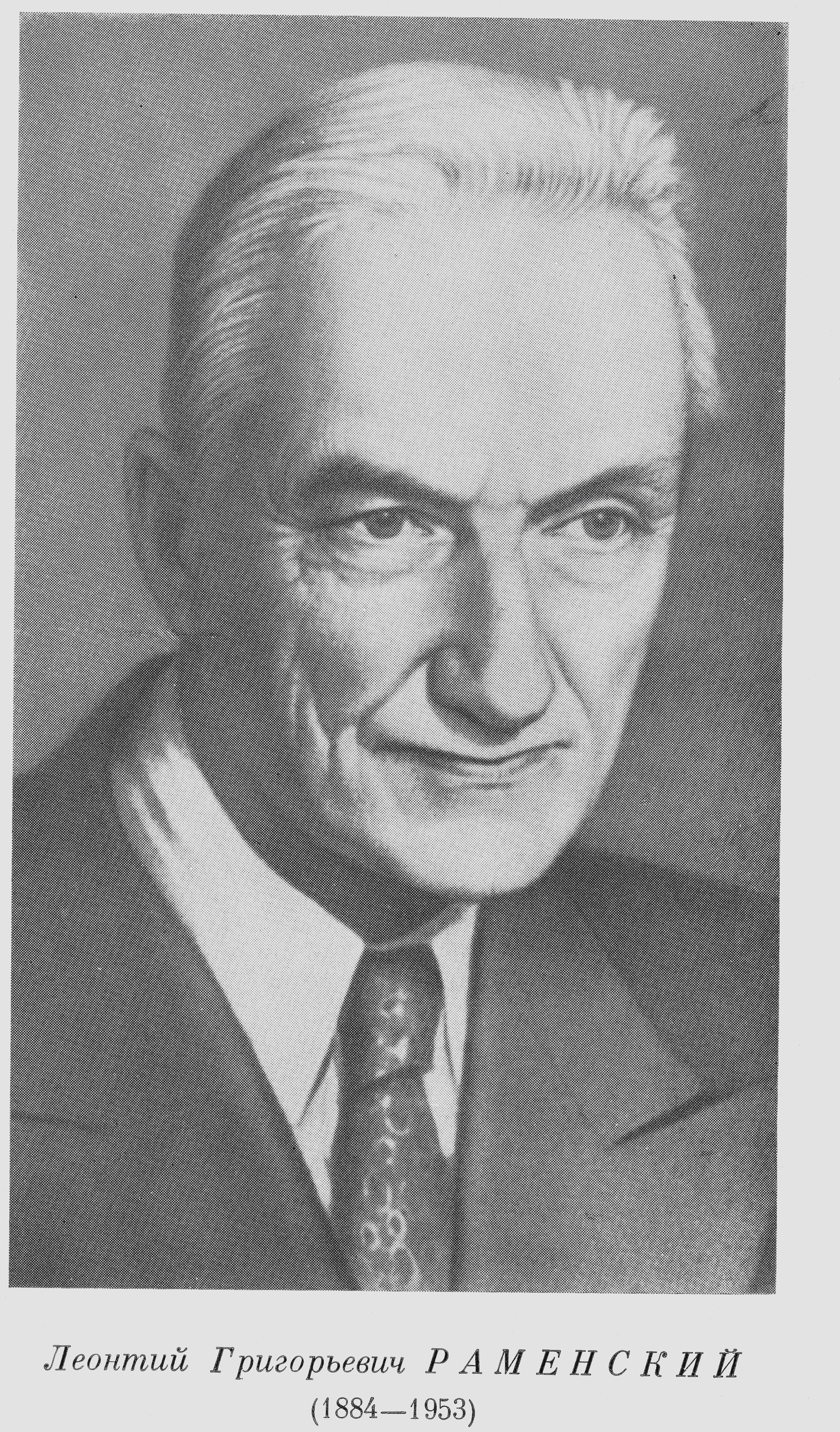
Leonty Ramensky

- Elsie Quarterman (United States)
- T. A. Rabotnov (Russia/Soviet Union)
- Leonty Ramensky (Russia/Soviet Union)
- Derek Ratcliffe (UK)
- Christen Raunkiær (Denmark)
- Alfred Clarence Redfield (United States)
- Edward Ricketts (United States)
- Robert Ricklefs (United States)
- Edith A. Roberts (United States)
- Michael Rosenzweig (United States)
- Joan Roughgarden (United States)
- Edward James Salisbury (UK)
- José Sarukhán (Mexico)
- David Schindler (Canada)
- William H. Schlesinger (United States)
- Karl Patterson Schmidt (United States)
- Thomas W. Schoener (United States)
- Paul Sears (United States)
- Homer Leroy Shantz (United States)
- Victor Ernest Shelford (United States)
- Daniel Simberloff (United States)
- Lawrence B. Slobodkin (United States)
- Ian Stirling (Canada)
- George Sugihara (United States)
- Raman Sukumar (India)
- Arthur Tansley (UK)
- John Terborgh (United States)
- G. David Tilman (United States)
- Donald Ward Tinkle (United States)
- C. Richard Tracy (United States)
- Göte Turesson (Sweden)
- Monica Turner (United States)

== U-Z ==
- Robert Ulanowicz (United States)
- Louise Vet (Netherlands)
- Eugenius Warming (Denmark)
- Alexander Watt (UK)
- John Ernest Weaver (United States)
- Franklin White (Canada)
- Robert Whittaker (United States)
- George C. Williams (United States)
- Edward Osborne Wilson (United States)
- Sergei Winogradsky (Russia)
- Christian Wissel (Germany)
- Albert Hazen Wright (United States)
- Joy Zedler (United States)

== See also ==
- List of climate scientists
- List of women climate scientists and activists
