= Martiny (surname) =

Martiny is a surname. Notable people with the surname include:

- Constant Martiny (1888–1942), Belgian intelligence agent
- Danny Martiny (born 1951), American politician and attorney
- Donald Martiny (born 1953), American artist
- Erik Martiny (born 1971), Franco-Irish-Swedish novelist, academic and journalist
- Jennifer Martiny, American ecologist
- Marie Deluil-Martiny (1841–1884), French nun
- Philip Martiny (1858–1927), Franco-American sculptor
