= Keddie =

Keddie may refer to:

- Keddie, California, U.S.
- Keddies, a British department store chain

== People with the surname ==
- Alex Keddie (born 1981), Scottish footballer
- Asher Keddie (born 1974), Australian actress
- Bob Keddie (born 1946), Australian rules footballer
- Gail Keddie (born c.1955), British competitive figure skater
- Henrietta Keddie (1827–1914), Scottish novelist
- Jack Keddie (1922–1945), Australian rules footballer
- Jim Keddie (1906–1984), Australian rules footballer
- Nikki Keddie (born 1930), American professor of Eastern, Iranian, and women's history

== See also ==
- Keddy (disambiguation)
- Keedy (disambiguation)
- Kiddie (disambiguation)
