= Ramensky =

Ramensky (masculine), Ramenskaya (feminine), or Ramenskoye (neuter) may refer to:

People

- Johnny Ramensky (1905–1972), Scottish criminal and war hero
- Leonty Ramensky (1884–1953), Russian/Soviet ecologist

Places

- Ramensky District, a district of Moscow Oblast, Russia
- Ramenskoye Urban Settlement, a municipal formation which the Town of Ramenskoye in Ramensky District of Moscow Oblast, Russia is incorporated as
- Ramensky (inhabited locality) (Ramenskaya, Ramenskoye), several inhabited localities in Russia
