= Keddy =

Keddy is a surname that may refer to:

- Carole Keddy (1937-2016), Canadian educator and politician
- Gerald Keddy (born 1953), Canadian politician
- James Keddy (born 1973), Irish footballer
- Paul Keddy (born 1953), Canadian ecologist

== See also ==
- Keddie (disambiguation)
- Keedy (disambiguation)
