= Bohanna =

Bohanna is a surname. Notable people with the surname include:

- Quinton Bohanna (born 1999), American football player
- Tara Bohanna (born 1995), Australian rules footballer

== See also ==
- Bohannan
