= Peter Morin =

Peter Morin may refer to:

- Peter Morin (artist), Canadian artist from the Tahltan Nation
- Peter B. Morin, American politician
- Peter J. Morin (born 1953), American ecologist
