= Mauro Galetti =

Brazilian ecologist and conservation biologist

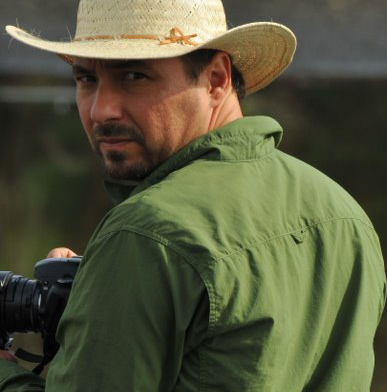
- Mauro Galetti in the Pantanal, Brazil
- Born: 19 January 1967 (age 59); Campinas, São Paulo, Brazil
- Citizenship: Brazilian and Portuguese
- Education: University of Cambridge, Robinson College
- Known for: discovering how mutualism disruption changes plant evolution, effects of defaunation on nutrient cycling and plant diversity
- Awards: WWF (1998), Jabuti Acadêmico (2024)
- Scientific career
- Fields: Conservation biology, Rainforests
- Workplaces: Universidade Estadual Paulista, Stanford University, Aarhus University, University of Miami, Florida International University
- Doctoral advisor: David J. Chivers

Mauro Galetti. is a Brazilian ecologist and conservation biologist. He is a full professor in the Department of Biodiversity at the Universidade Estadual Paulista, Rio Claro, São Paulo and has worked at Stanford University (USA), Aarhus University (Denmark) and the University of Miami (USA). He also holds a position as a Courtesy Associated Professor at Florida International University, Miami, FL. Galetti's work has centred on analyzing the ecological and evolutionary consequences of defaunation. He was awarded by WWF in 1998 and was a Tinker Fellow at Stanford University and a visiting professor at Aarhus Universitet, Denmark in 2017.

He is currently one of the Center for Research on Biodiversity Dynamics and Climate Change directors in Rio Claro and Editor-in-Chief of Global Ecology and Conservation.

== Early life and education ==
Galetti was born in Campinas, São Paulo during the Military regime in Brazil. Grandson of a Portuguese immigrant from Madeira Island and son of Physics teacher, Galetti was always influenced by his brother Marcos Rodrigues and his uncle Pedro Manoel Galetti Jr., who are both biologists. He grew up in Campinas, São Paulo until the age of 25, when he moved to University of Cambridge to earn the Doctor of Philosophy. Galetti is an alumni member of Robinson College.

During his childhood, he studied in a suburban school until his parents moved him to Imaculada Coração de Maria, a prestigious private school. He enrolled in the Biology course at State University of Campinas in 1986. Since his early days in the university, he noticed that most classes were uninteresting to him, so he decided to spend most of his mornings in the forest fragment near Mata de Santa Genebra, Campinas, São Paulo. There, he starts observing and studying howler monkeys, squirrels, and other fruit-eating animals. By following howler monkeys from dusk to dawn, he realized a myriad of frugivores that rely on fleshy fruits in the rainforest. In the University, he was inspired by his former professors and naturalists Ivan Sazima, Keith Brown, and Wesley R. Silva. Galetti was supervised by Dr. Leonor Patricia Cerdeira Morellato, who compared the interactions between fruits and frugivores in this forest fragment. His work is a pioneer in understanding the complex network interactions between fruits and frugivores in hyper-diverse ecosystems. The small forest fragment near the university was his major laboratory where he spent most mornings watching birds and mammals eating fruits.

In 1988, Galetti attended a talk by the Mexican ecologist Rodolfo Dirzo, who presents for the first time his ideas about the impact of defaunation on plant communities. This talk influenced him for the rest of his career.

Galetti enrolled in the Master's program at State University of Campinas in 1990, and by August 1992 (after 18 months), he received a Master's in Science diploma and moved to Cambridge in September 1992. From 1992 to 1996, he was enrolled in the Wildlife Research Group at Cambridge University, UK. His thesis, "Fruits and frugivores in a tropical forest", received the WWF award for the best thesis supported in that year.

At the Cambridge University, he worked at the Wildlife Research Group under David Chivers supervision. Other members of this lab. are Carlos Peres, Adriano Chiarello, Kim McConkey, Alfredo Cuarón.

== Career ==
Galetti got his Ph.D. at University of Cambridge in 1996. In Cambridge, Galetti was supervised by the primatologist David J. Chivers. At this time, Galetti met a young primatologist Carlos A. Peres who influenced him to study keystone species instead of primates. He decides to test the concept of keystone species in tropical forests for the first time, comparing the abundance of fruit-eating birds and mammals in areas with a dense population of palms Euterpe edulis with neighbouring sites without palms. During their last year in Cambridge, he spent a week in Seville with Pedro Jordano, which changed his life. Jordano was a young scientist expert in frugivory and seed dispersal who took Galetti to Sierra de Cazorla and taught him about the Mediterranean ecosystems. Before coming back to Brazil, Galetti's moved to Barito Ulu project in Kalimantan, Indonesia. He decided to spend a year studying for the first time seed dispersal by hornbills and sunbears, after 3 months however, a civil war erupted in Indonesia and he decided to return to Brazil. He was one of the first ecologists to study toucans and hornbills in the wild.

After four months in Borneo, he moved back to Brazil and became a professor at São Paulo State University in 1998, where he works at the Department of Biodiversity. He was a visiting scientist at Spanish National Research Council in Seville in 2007 and Thinker Professor at Stanford University from 2008 to 2009 at Center for Latin American Studies. During his period at Stanford, he was associated with Professor Rodolfo Dirzo, the father of defaunation ideas.

In 2017, he was Visiting Faculty at Aarhus Universitet, Denmark, where he collaborated intensively with Dr. Jens-Christian Svenning. From 2020 to 2022, he was an associate professor at the University of Miami, FL, USA, and is a courtesy Associate Professor at Florida International University.

Galetti was the pioneer in publishing about rewilding, particularly after visiting Kruger National Park in South Africa. He was the first to discuss that most of the Brazilian cerrado is a Pleistocene megafauna defaunated ecosystem.

Galetti has written on ecology for several journals including Science, PLOS ONE and Biological Conservation and his contribution has been much debated by public media. Galetti has published more than 220 papers and was the Editor of Biological Conservation for Latin America

In 2013, his paper was Highly Recommended by the Faculty of 1000. In 2019, 2020, 2021,2022,2023, and 2024, he was considered one of the top 1% of most influential scientists in the world by Clarivate Analytics.

Galetti also received the Jabuti Acadêmico Award and ABEU Award for his book "Um Naturalista no Antropoceno" published by Editora Unesp.

== Selected publications ==
Dirzo, R., H. S. Young, M. Galetti, G. Ceballos, N. J. B. Isaac, and B. Collen. 2014. Defaunation in the Anthropocene. Science 345:401-406.

Galetti, M., R. Guevara, M. C. Cortes, R. Fadini, S. Von Matter, A. B. Leite, F. Labecca, T. Ribeiro, C. S. Carvalho, R. G. Collevatti, M. M. Pires, P. R. Guimaraes, P. H. Brancalion, M. C. Ribeiro, and P. Jordano. 2013. Functional Extinction of Birds Drives Rapid Evolutionary Changes in Seed Size. Science 340:1086-1090.

Johnson, C. N., Balmford, A., Brook, B. W., Buettel, J. C., Galetti, M., Guangchun, L., & Wilmshurst, J. M. (2017). Biodiversity losses and conservation responses in the Anthropocene. Science, 356(6335), 270-275.

Galetti, M. and R. Dirzo. 2013. Ecological and evolutionary consequences of living in a defaunated world. Biological Conservation 163:1-6.

Bueno, R. S., R. Guevara, M. C. Ribeiro, L. Culot, F. S. Bufalo, and M. Galetti. 2013. Functional Redundancy and Complementarities of Seed Dispersal by the Last Neotropical Megafrugivores. PLoS ONE 8:e56252.

Hansen, D. M. and M. Galetti. 2009. The forgotten megafauna. Science 324:42-43.

Galetti, M., H. C. Giacomini, R. S. Bueno, C. S. S. Bernardo, R. M. Marques, R. S. Bovendorp, C. E. Steffler, P. Rubim, S. K. Gobbo, C. I. Donatti, R. A. Begotti, F. Meirelles, R. d. A. Nobre, A. G. Chiarello, and C. A. Peres. 2009. Priority areas for the conservation of Atlantic forest large mammals. Biological Conservation 142:1229-1241.

Guimaraes Jr, Paulo R., Mauro Galetti, and Pedro Jordano. "Seed dispersal anachronisms: rethinking the fruits extinct megafauna ate." PloS one 3.3 (2008): e1745.

== Honours and awards ==
- World Wide Fund for Nature (1998)
- Most influential scientists (2019)
- Most influential scientists (2020)
- Most influential scientists (2021)
- Most influential scientists (2022)
- Most influential scientists (2023)
- Most influential scientists (2024)
