= Roger Bray =

Roger Bray may refer to:

- J. Roger Bray (1929–2018), American-born ecologist
- Roger Ernest Bray (1875–1952), Canadian activist
