= Phyllis Coley =

Biologist

- Education: Hampshire College, University of Chicago
- Scientific career
- Fields: Biology
- Institutions: University of Utah, Smithsonian Tropical Research Institute
- Doctoral advisor: Robin B. Foster
- Website: coley.biology.utah.edu/coley.html

Phyllis Dewing Coley is a Biology professor currently teaching at the University of Utah. In 1996 she received the University's Distinguished Research Award. She has been a research associate at the Smithsonian Tropical Research Institute since 1995. In 2023, she was elected to the National Academy of Sciences.

In 1974, she completed her B.A. at Hampshire College. Her M.A. and doctorate were completed at the University of Chicago by studying resource availability theory, including the effects of leaf age and plant life history patterns on herbivory, and patterns of plant defenses.

Throughout her academic career, Coley has received multiple honors and awards. She received the National Science Foundation (NSF) Career Advancement Award in 1994 and in 2002 was named an ISI highly cited researcher in Ecology/Environment. Since 2006, Coley has been a fellow of the American Academy of Arts and Sciences (AAAS).

== Research interests ==
Coley's research interests include bioprospecting and plant defenses and herbivory in tropical forests. Additional emphasis of research includes the study of conservation of tropical rainforests and how tropical herbivores are regulated by the third trophic level

Current attentions in her research are focused on chemical defenses and linking these to other plant traits, within a phylogenetic context. This research is primarily based on the tropical plants part of the family Fabaceae as a model to understand how herbivores may be driving rapid evolution of defenses and how this might contribute to community assembly and speciation in the genus

Her research has implications in understanding multi-species comparisons and interactions in tropical communities.

== Selected publications ==
Coley, P.D. 1980. Effects of leaf age and plant life history patterns on herbivory. Nature 284:545-546.

Coley, P.D. 1982. Rates of herbivory on different tropical trees. Pages 123–132. In: The Ecology of a Tropical Forest: Seasonal Rhythms and Long-term Changes, E.G. Leigh, A.S. Rand and D.M. Windsor (eds), Smithsonian Press.

Coley, P.D. 1983. Herbivory and defensive characteristics of tree species in a lowland tropical forest. Ecological Monographs 53:209-233.

Coley, P.D. 1983. Intra-specific variation in herbivory on two tropical tree species. Ecology 64:426-433.

Putz, F.E., P.D. Coley, K. Lu, A. Montalvo and A. Aillelo. 1983. Uprooting and snapping of trees: Structural determinants and ecological consequences. Canadian Journal of Forest Research 13:1011-1020.

Angehr, G., P.D. Coley, and A. Worthington. 1984. Guía de los Árboles Comunes del Parque Nacional Soberanía, Panamá. Smithsonian Institution Press.

Coley, P.D., J.P. Bryant, F.S. Chapin, III. 1985. Resource availability and plant anti-herbivore defense. Science 230:895-899.

Coley, P.D. 1986. Costs and benefits of defense by tannins in a neo-tropical tree. Oecologia 70:238-241.

Salo, J., R. Kalliola, I. Hakkinen, Y. Makinen, P. Niemela, M. Puhakka, and P.D. Coley. 1986. River dynamics and diversity of Amazon lowland forest. Nature 322:254-258.

Coley, P.D. 1987. Patrones en las defensas de las plantas: ¿Porque los herbivoros prefrieren ciertas especies?. Revista de Biología Tropical 35 (suppl):251-263.

Bazzaz, F.A., N. Chiariello, P.D. Coley and L.F. Pitelka. 1987. Allocating resources to reproduction and defense. Bioscience 37:58-67.

Coley, P.D. 1987. Species differences in leaf defenses of tropical trees. Pages 30–35. In: Fourth Annual Wildland Shrup Symposium on Plant-Herbivore Interactions. F.D. Provenza and J. Flinders (eds).

Dirzo, R. F.S. Chapin, P.D. Coley, D.H. Janzen, R. Marquis, L. McHargue, J Nunez-Farfan and K Oyama. 1987. Problemas importantes en el estudio de interacciones planta-herbivoro en los bosques tropicales. Revista de Biología Tropical 35 (suppl):207-211.

Coley, P.D. 1987. Interspecific variation in plant anti-herbivore properties: The role of habitat quality and rate of disturbance. New Phytologist 106 (suppl):251-263.

Coley, P.D. 1988. Effects of plant growth rate and leaf lifetime on the amount and type of anti-herbivore defense. Oecologia 74:531-536.

Coley, P.D. and T.M. Aide. 1989. Red coloration of tropical young leaves: A possible antifungal defense. Journal of Tropical Ecology 5:293-300.

Jing, S.W. and P.D. Coley. 1990. Dioecy and herbivory: the effect of growth rate on plant defense in Acer negundo. Oikos 58:369-377.

Coley, P.D. and T.M. Aide. 1991. Comparison of herbivory and plant defenses in temperate and tropical broad-leaved forests. Pages 25–49. In: Plant-Animal Interactions: Evolutionary Ecology in Tropical and Temperate Regions, edited by PW Price, TM Lewinsohn, GW Fernandes and WW Benson, Wiley & Sons, NY.

Kursar, T. A. and P. D. Coley. 1991. Nitrogen content and expansion rate of young leaves of rainforest species: Implications for herbivory. Biotropica 23:141-150.

Kursar, T. A. and P. D. Coley. 1992. Delayed development of the photosynthetic apparatus in tropical rainforest species. Functional Ecology 6:411-422.
