= Nancy E. McIntyre =

American landscape ecologist

Nancy E. McIntyre is an American academic in the fields of landscape and urban ecology. She is a professor in the Department of Biological Science and the curator of birds at the Natural Science Research Laboratory museum at the Texas Tech University Her research involves the use of geographic data and information to answer questions about the structure, function and change in the landscape with focus on birds and insects. Her work has implications for conservation and natural resource management.

== Education ==
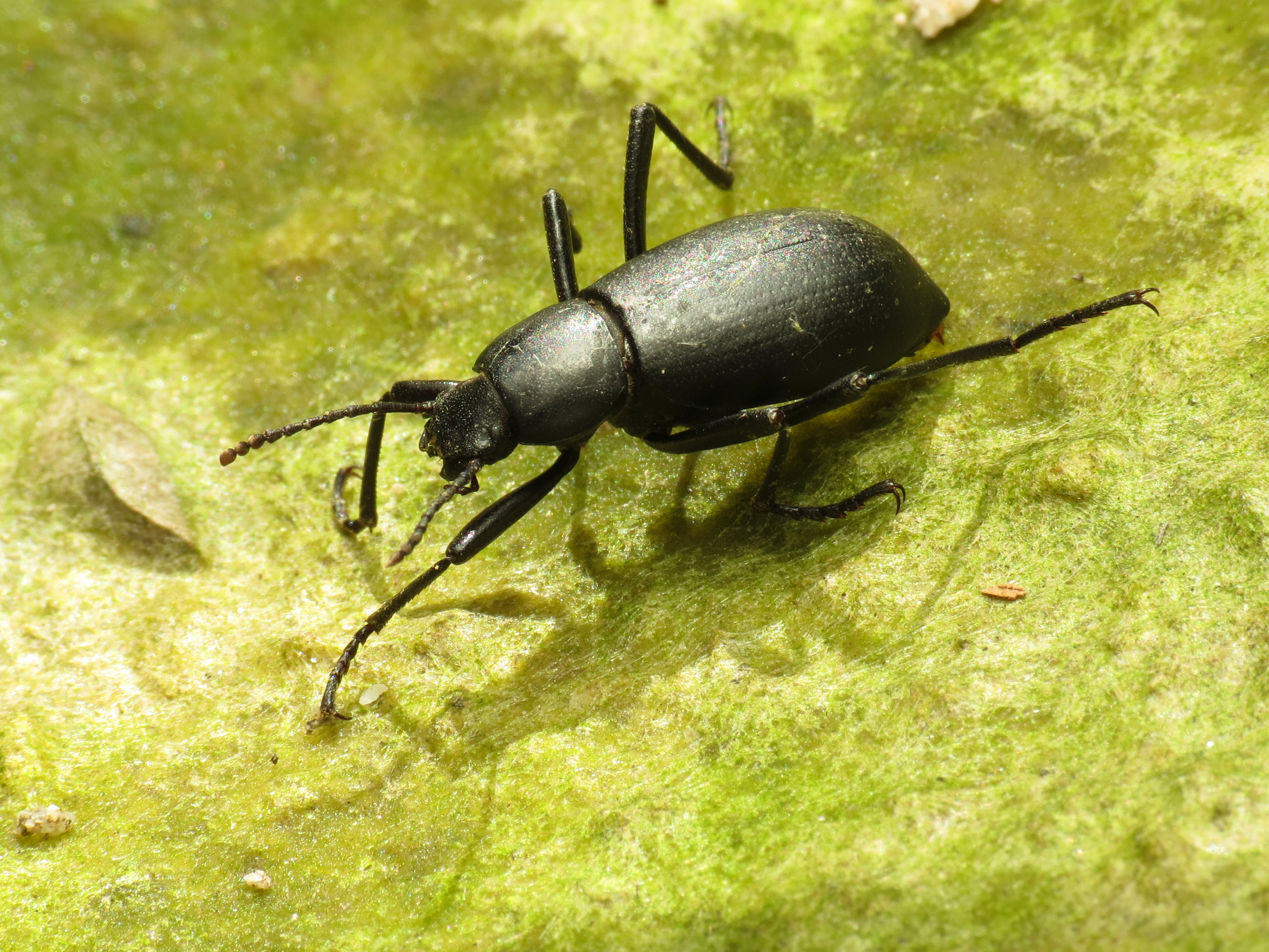
Eleodes beetle (Desert stink beetle.

McIntyre was awarded a B.A. magna cum laude zoology from the University of Georgia in 1991. In 1993, McIntyre earned an M.S. in zoology at the University of Georgia, under the mentorship of Frank Golley. McIntyre examined forest size, its relationship to bird assemblage (the type of species present) and bird migration strategies. Under the mentorship of John Wiens, McIntyre attained her Doctor of Philosophy in ecology at Colorado State University in 1998. McIntyre used the Eleodes beetle as an experimental model to investigate the way in which the area and nature of a habitat affect the beetles' movement and location. This involved large-scale field studies.

== Career and research ==
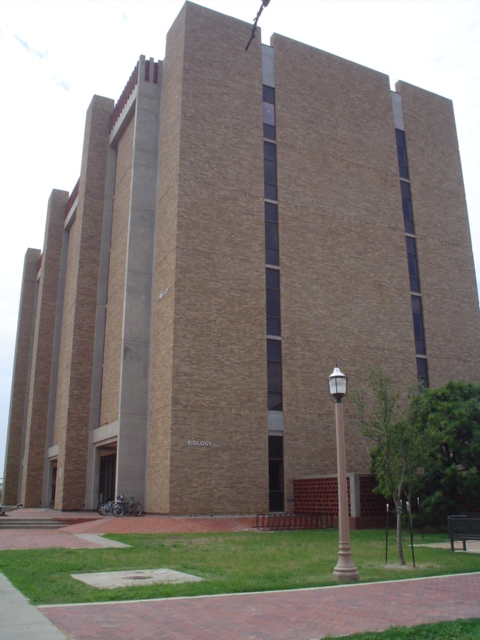
Biology building at Texas Tech University.

McIntyre's career began as a postdoctoral researcher at Arizona State University where she worked in the area of urban ecology at the Central Arizona-Phoenix Long-term Ecological Research project. In 2000, McIntyre joined the faculty of the Department of Biological Science at Texas Tech University. Her research focusses on relationships between organisms and their environment and the way in which human activities affect those relationships. Specifically, McIntyre examines birds and insects in forest, grassland, wetland, and urban ecosystems. She researches anthropogenic habitat fragmentation and its effects on insects and bird numbers, diversity and risk of extinction.

McIntyre has served on the editorial boards of scientific journal including Landscape Ecology, Urban Ecosystems, BioScience, and the Journal of Urban Ecology. She served as President-elect of the International Association for Landscape Ecology – North America from 2019 to 2020 and as President of the organization from 2020 to 2022.

== Awards and recognition ==
- International Association for Landscape Ecology – North America, Distinguished Service Award, 2018.
- Top 2 percent of most cited researchers.
- President's Excellence in Teaching Award, Texas Tech University, 2013.

== Selected publications ==
- Heintzman, Lucas J.; McIntyre, Nancy E. (June 2019). "Quantifying the effects of projected urban growth on connectivity among wetlands in the Great Plains (USA)". Landscape and Urban Planning. 186: 1–12. Bibcode:2019LUrbP.186....1H. doi:10.1016/j.landurbplan.2019.02.007.
- McIntyre, Nancy E.; Collins, Steven D.; Heintzman, Lucas J.; Starr, Scott M.; van Gestel, Natasja (August 2018). "The challenge of assaying landscape connectivity in a changing world: A 27-year case study in the southern Great Plains (USA) playa network". Ecological Indicators. 91: 607–616. Bibcode:2018EcInd..91..607M. doi:10.1016/j.ecolind.2018.04.051.
- Collins, S.D.; Heintzman, L.J.; Starr, S.M.; Wright, C.K.; Henebry, G.M.; McIntyre, N.E. (October 2014). "Hydrological dynamics of temporary wetlands in the southern Great Plains as a function of surrounding land use". Journal of Arid Environments. 109: 6–14. Bibcode:2014JArEn.109....6C. doi:10.1016/j.jaridenv.2014.05.006.
- McIntyre, Nancy E; Wright, Christopher K; Swain, Sharmistha; Hayhoe, Katharine; Liu, Ganming; Schwartz, Frank W; Henebry, Geoffrey M (February 2014). "Climate forcing of wetland landscape connectivity in the Great Plains". Frontiers in Ecology and the Environment. 12 (1): 59–64. Bibcode:2014FrEE...12...59M. doi:10.1890/120369.
- Niemelä, J., J.H. Breuste, T. Elmqvist, G. Guntenspergen, P. James, and N.E. McIntyre, eds. 2011. Urban Ecology: Patterns, Processes, and Applications. Oxford University Press.
- Mcintyre, N. E.; Knowles-Yánez, K.; Hope, D. (2000). "Urban ecology as an interdisciplinary field: differences in the use of 'urban' between the social and natural sciences". Urban Ecosystems. 4 (1): 5–24. doi:10.1023/A:1009540018553.
  - Included in Urban Ecology: An International Perspective on the Interaction Between Humans and Nature (J.M. Marzluff, E. Shulenberger, W. Endlicher, M. Alberti, G. Bradley, C. Ryan, U. Simon, and C. ZumBrunnen, eds.), pp. 49–65. Springer, 2008. [A compilation of the “classic” papers from the field of urban ecology.]
  - Included in Urban Ecology: Critical Concepts in Geography (I. Douglas, ed.). Routledge Publishing, 2015. [A compilation of the “classic” papers from urban ecology and urban geography.]
- McIntyre, Nancy E.; Wiens, John A. (October 1999). "How Does Habitat Patch Size Affect Animal Movement? An Experiment with Darkling Beetles". Ecology. 80 (7): 2261. doi:10.2307/176908. JSTOR 176908.
- McIntyre, Nancy E.; Wiens, John A. (1999). "Interactions between Habitat Abundance and Configuration: Experimental Validation of Some Predictions from Percolation Theory". Oikos. 86 (1): 129–137. Bibcode:1999Oikos..86..129M. doi:10.2307/3546577. JSTOR 3546577.
  - Cited in Essentials of Landscape Ecology (K.A. With). Oxford University Press, 2019. [A textbook of landscape ecology.]
