= Bohannan =

Bohannan is a surname. Notable people with the surname include:

- Ambrose Bohannan, Virginia settler
- Barbara Bohannan-Sheppard (born 1950), American politician
- Brendan Bohannan, microbial and evolutionary biologist
- Charles G. Bohannan (1852–1934), mayor of South Norwalk, Connecticut (1897–1898, 1899–1901), son of John G.
- Christina Bohannan (born 1971), American engineer, legal scholar, and politician
- John G. Bohannan (1827–1897), Confederate Army colonel, State Representative from Matthews County, Virginia (1885–1886), father of Charles G.
- Laura Bohannan (1922–2002), American cultural anthropologist and author; wife of Paul
- Paul Bohannan (1920–2007), American anthropologist; husband of Laura
- R. LeFond Bohannan, founder of the Medical College of Virginia
- Thomas Bohannan (born 1955), American Thoroughbred racehorse trainer
