= Vladimir Sukachev =

Russian-Soviet botanist, engineer and geographer

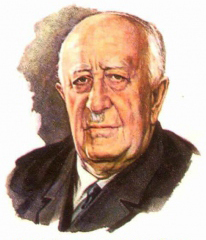
- Education: Doktor of Biology Sciences
- Alma mater: Imperial Forestry Institute
- Occupation: Botanist, forestry engineer
- Employer: Museum of Botanical Garden of V.L. Komarov Botanical Institute (1912–1918); Komarov Botanical Institute (1931–1933); Saint Petersburg State Forestry University; Saint Petersburg State University (1931–1941)
- Political party: Communist Party of the Soviet Union
- Spouse(s): Henrietta Poplavskaya
- Awards: Hero of Socialist Labour (1965)

Vladimir Nikolayevich Sukachev (also spelled Vladimir Nikolajevich Sukaczev) (Russian: Влади́мир Никола́евич Сукачёв; born 7 June 1880 in Aleksandrovka, Russian Empire – died 9 February 1967 in Moscow) was a Russian geobotanist, engineer, geographer, and corresponding member (1920) and full member (1943) of the USSR Academy of Sciences. His wife was Henrietta Ippolitovna Poplavskaja.

== Education ==
Suckachev attended Imperial Forestry Institute in Saint Petersburg, where he studied under Gavriil Ivanovich Tanfilyev and Vasily Dokuchaev. He graduated in 1902 and remained several years with the institute as an assistant and instructor.

== Career ==
In 1919 Sukachev founded the Department of Dendrology and Systematics of Plants at the Imperial Forestry Institute, which he chaired until 1941.

From 1941 to 1943, he managed the Department of the Biological Sciences at the Ural Forestry Institute, in Sverdlovsk.

In 1944, Sukachev organized the Forestry Institute of the USSR Academy of Sciences (now the Institute of Forest and Wood of Siberian Department of the Academy of Sciences of the USSR, Krasnoyarsk), which he led up to 1959.

Sukachev also led the Laboratory of Forestry USSR Academy of Sciences (1959) and the Laboratory of Biogeocenology with the Botanical Institute of the AS USSR (1965).

== Associations and honors ==
Sukachev was president of the Moscow Naturalists Society from 1955 to 1967. He was a founding member of the Russian Botanical Society (1915); and was from 1946 to 1963 its president (from 1964 honorary president).

He was elected foreign member of the Polish Academy of Sciences in 1959 and corresponding member of the Czechoslovak Agricultural Academy in 1927.

== Legacy ==
The Sukachev Institute of Forestry, part of the Russian Academy of Sciences, in Moscow, is named after him.

== Selected works ==
- Sukachev, V. N. (1934). Что такое фитоценоз? [What is a plant community?]. Sovietskaya Botanika (in Russian). 1934 (5): 4–18.
- Sukachev, V. N. (1942). Идея развития в фитоценологии [Thoughts on plant community dynamics]. Sovietskaya Botanika (in Russian). 1942 (1–3): 5–17.
- Sukachev, V. N. (1944). О принципах генетической классификации в биоценологии [On the principles of genetic classification in biocoenology]. Žurnal Obščei Biologii (in Russian). 5 (4): 213–227.
- Сукачёв В.Н. Биогеоценология и фитоценология // Докл. АН СССР. 1945. Т. 47, № 6. С. 447–449. *Сукачёв В.Н. О соотношении понятий "географический ландшафт" и "биогеоценоз" // Вопросы географии. М. : Географгиз, 1949. Вып. 16. С. 45–60.
- Сукачёв В.Н. Общие принципы и программа изучения типов леса // Сукачёв В.Н., Зонн С.В. Методические указания к изучению типов леса. 2-е изд. М. : Изд-во АН СССР, 1961. С. 9–75.
- Сукачёв В.Н. Биогеоценоз как выражение взаимодействия живой и неживой природы на поверхности Земли : соотношение понятий "биогеоценоз", "экосистема", "географический ландшафт" и "фация" // Основы лесной биогеоценологии / под ред. В.Н. Сукачёва, Н.В. Дылиса. М. : Наука, 1964. С. 5–49.
- см. также: Сукачёв В.Н. Избранные труды в трех томах / под ред. Е.М. Лавренко. – Л. : Наука. –Т. 1 : Основы лесной типологии и биогеоценологии. – 1972. – 419 с.; Т. 2 : Проблемы болотоведения, палеоботаники и палеогеографии. – 1973. – 352 с.; Т. 3 : Проблемы фитоценологии. – 1975. – 543 с.
- Sukachev, V. N. (1928). "Principles of Classification of the Spruce Communities of European Russia". Journal of Ecology. 16 (1): 1–18. doi:10.2307/2255841. ISSN 1365-2745. JSTOR 2255841.

== See also ==
- Biocoenosis
- Leonty Ramensky
