= Leonty Ramensky =

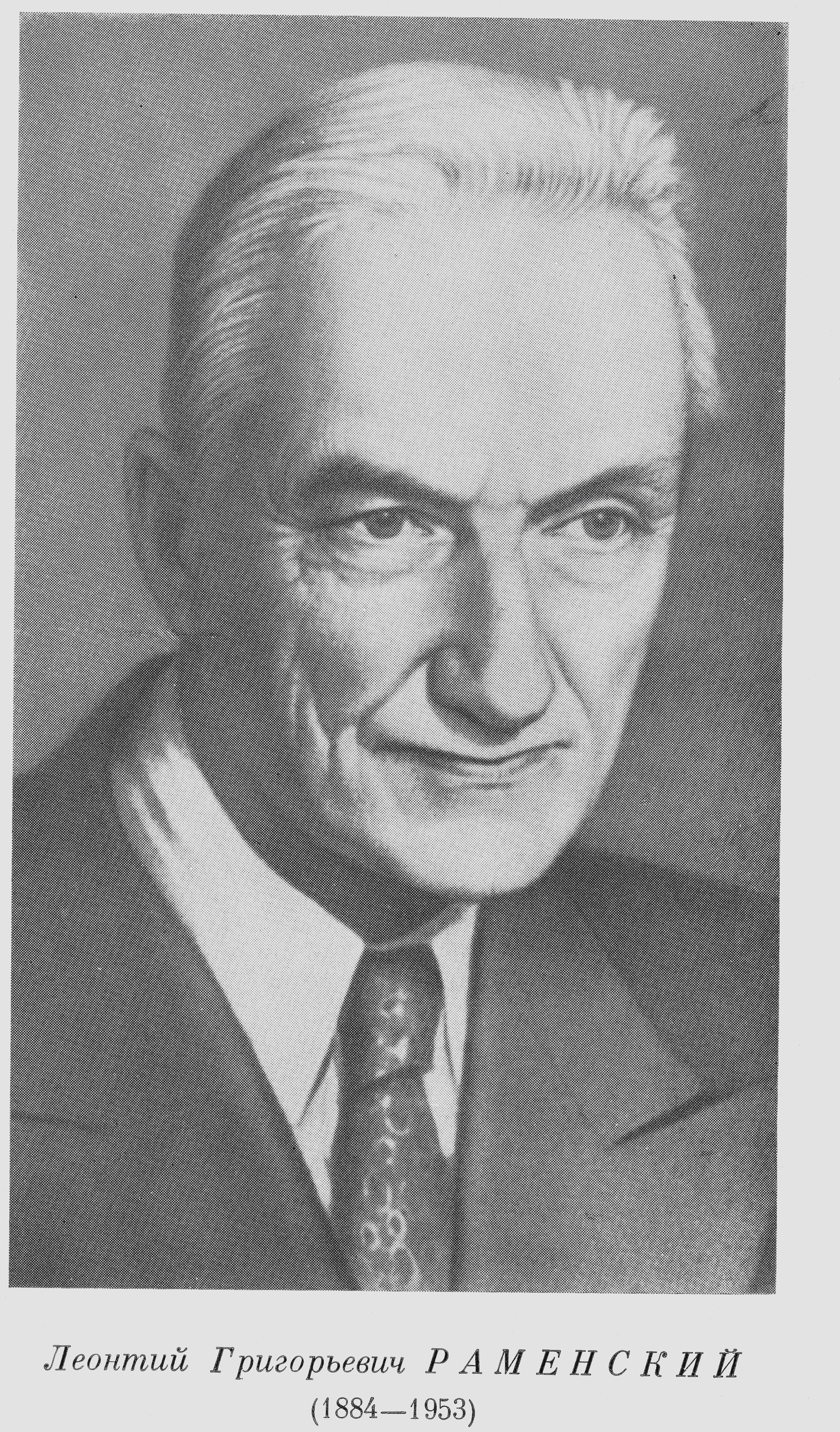
- Born: June 16, 1884; Saint Petersburg
- Died: January 27, 1953 (aged 68); Moscow
- Known for: first formulating plant life strategies plant indicator values ecological gradient analysis
- Scientific career
- Fields: Ecology
- Workplaces: All-union Scientific Research Institute of Forages dedicated to V.R.Williams

Leonty Grigoryevich Ramensky (Russian: Лео́нтий Григо́рьевич Ра́менский; 16 June [O.S. 4 June] 1884 – January 27, 1953) was a plant ecologist who conceived several important ideas that were overlooked in the West and later ’re-invented’ by western scientists. He lived in the Russian Empire and later the Soviet Union.

He graduated from the Petrograd University in 1916 and obtained a Ph.D. in biology in 1935. From 1911 to 1928 he worked in the Research Institute of the Voronezh Gouvernement (now Voronezh State University) and from 1928 in the State Grassland Institute (later All-union Scientific Research Institute of Forages dedicated to V.R.Williams). Ramensky was a proponent of the view that biotic communities consist of species behaving individualistically (much like Henry Gleason in the U.S.A.). This was in strong contrast to the prevailing view of communities as super-organisms, held by the powerful V.N.Sukachov and his consorts (much like Frederic Clements in the U.S.A.). Hence, Ramensky was marginalized within the Russian scientific community and was only posthumously rehabilitated by Russian ecologists. Much later, the significance of his ideas was discovered by ecologists in the West.

== Selected scientific works ==
1. Ramensky, L. G. (1929). К методике сравнительной обработки и систематизации списков растительности и других объектов, определяемых несколькими несходно действующими факторами [On methods for comparative analysis and ordering of plant lists and other objects determined by multiple factors] (in Russian). Leningrad: Trudy Soveščaniya Geobotanikov-lugovedov. pp. 1–26.

- Translated to German and published 1930 as Zur Methodik der vergleichenden Bearbeitung und Ordnung von Pflanzenlisten und anderen Objekten, die durch mehrere verschiedenartig wirkende Faktoren bestimmt warden in: Emil Abderhalden's Beiträge zur Biologie der Pflanzen (Breslau) 18: 269-304.

In this work, Ramensky criticized the use of hierarchical classifications of plant communities and advocated ordination ("Ordnung") of communities (and other complex objects with multiple determining factors, such as soil profile and weather data) instead. He was explicit about assuming unimodal responses of species to underlying gradients in the environment. This was long before Correspondence analysis was first used (1952), the now classic applications of ordination to plant communities by J. Roger Bray and John T. Curtis and David W. Goodall and the theoretical foundations of gradient analysis was developed by Whittaker and others (1970s onwards).

2. Ramensky, L. G. (1938). Введение в комплексное почвенно-геоботаническое исследование земель [Introduction to comprehensive soil-plant studies of landscapes] (in Russian). Moskva: Sel'khozgiz. In this work, Ramensky proposed fundamental plant life strategies towards stress and disturbance. This work is a precursor of Grime's CSR strategy scheme.

3. Ramensky, L. G.; Tsatsenkin, I. A.; Čižikov, O. N.; Antipov, N. A. (1956). Экологическая оценка кормовых угодий по растительному покрову [Ecological evaluation of grazed lands by their vegetation] (in Russian). Moskva: Sel'khozgiz. In this work, Ramensky and colleagues listed some 1,400 plant species from European Russia with tabulated quantitative indicator values for their tolerances for soil moisture, nutrients, grazing etc. This work is a precursor of Ellenberg’s widespread indicator values.

4. Ramensky, L. G. (1971). Проблемы и методы изучения растительного покрова. Избранные работы [Problems and methods in the study of the plant cover: collected works] (in Russian). Leningrad: Nauka. This volume contains collected works of Ramensky.
