= Peter J. Morin =

- Born: Peter Jay Morin; September 8, 1953 (age 72); New Britain, CT, U.S.
- Education: Trinity College (BS), Duke University (PhD)
- Awards: American Association for the Advancement of Science
- Scientific career
- Fields: Community ecology
- Workplaces: Rutgers University
- Website: sites.rutgers.edu/peter-morin/

Peter J. Morin (born September 8, 1953) is an American ecologist known for his work in community ecology. He is a professor in the Department of Ecology, Evolution, and Natural Resources at Rutgers University, where he has been since 1983.

In 1991, Morin responded to reports of fluctuation in amphibian populations by advocating for more information on population decline rather than simply concluding that extinction occurred at a "higher rate" than it had been. A 1997 study conducted on the predictability of ecosystems showed that the greater the number of species within the ecosystem, the more predictable the environment would be. Morin stated that this could be applied to creating ecosystems in space.

Morin served as the director for the Hutcheson Memorial Forest in 2012.

== Awards ==
He received the George Mercer Award for 1985 from the Ecological Society of America for his article "Predation, Competition, and the Composition of Larval Anuran Guilds".

In 1999, he was elected as a fellow to the American Association for the Advancement of Science. Morin also received a citation for outstanding research at the April 27, 2000 NJAES Awards.

== Bibliography ==
=== Articles ===
- Peter J. Morin (June 1983). "Predation, Competition, and the Composition of Larval Anuran Guilds". Ecological Monographs. 53 (2): 119–138. doi:10.2307/1942491. ISSN 0012-9615. Wikidata Q115493650.
- John C. Moore; Eric L. Berlow; David C. Coleman; et al. (June 4, 2004). "Detritus, trophic dynamics and biodiversity". Ecology Letters. 7 (7): 584–600. doi:10.1111/j.1461-0248.2004.00606.x. ISSN 1461-023X. Wikidata Q55933733.
- Jennifer B.H. Martiny; Brendan J M Bohannan; James H Brown; et al. (February 1, 2006). "Microbial biogeography: putting microorganisms on the map". Nature Reviews Microbiology. 4 (2): 102–112. doi:10.1038/nrmicro1341. ISSN 1740-1534. PMID 16415926. Wikidata Q29614465.

=== Books ===
- Morin, Peter J. (1999). Community ecology. Malden: Blackwell Science. ISBN 9780865423503. OCLC 39672159.
- Verhoef, Herman A.; Morin, Peter J., eds. (2010). Community ecology : processes, models, and applications. Oxford: Oxford University Press. ISBN 9780199228973. OCLC 377824283.
- Morin, Peter J. (2011). Community ecology (2nd ed.). Chichester, West Sussex: Wiley. ISBN 9781444338218. OCLC 700735116.
