= Henrietta Poplavskaya =

Russian botanist (1885–1956)

Henrietta Ippolitovna Poplavskaja (1885–1956) was a Soviet botanist noted for plant collecting and identification in the Russian Federation alongside her husband Vladimir Nikolajevich Sukaczev. The standard author abbreviation Popl. is used to indicate this person as the author when citing a botanical name.
