= Keedy (disambiguation) =

Keedy (born 1965) is an American singer-songwriter.

Keedy may also refer to:

- Cornelius L. Keedy (1834–1911), American pastor, physician, and academic administrator
- Edwin R. Keedy (1880–1958), American legal scholar and academic administrator
- Gary Keedy (born 1974), English bowler
- Jeffery Keedy (born 1957), American graphic designer, writer, educator
- Pat Keedy (born 1958), American baseball player

== See also ==
- Keedy House, historic home in Boonsboro, Maryland
- Keedron Bryant, a singer
- Keedie Babb, a British singer
- Keddy (disambiguation)
- Kiddie (disambiguation)
