= Katharine N. Suding =

American plant ecologist

- Spouse: Paul Suding
- Awards: Robert H. MacArthur Award

Academic background
- Education: Bsc, 1994, Williams College; PhD, 1999, University of Michigan
- Thesis: Processes responsible for changes in plant species abundance following disturbance. (1999)

Katharine Nash Suding is an American plant ecologist. Suding is a Distinguished Professor of ecology and evolutionary biology at the University of Colorado Boulder and a 2020 Professor of Distinction in the College of Arts and Sciences.

== Early life and education ==
Suding was born to geologist J. Thomas and mother Marti Nash alongside sister Laura. She completed her Bachelor of Science degree from Williams College in 1994 and her PhD from the University of Michigan in 1999. As a graduate student, Suding received a fellowship from the Helen Olsen Brower Fellowship in Environmental Studies.

== Career ==
=== UC Irvine ===
Upon completing her formal education, Suding accepted a faculty position at the University of California, Irvine (UC Irvine). During her tenure, she was named a Distinguished Assistant Professor Award for Research in 2007 and received the 2008-09 Distinguished Assistant Professor Award for Research for her project "Forays into the Field: Local Impacts of Global Biological Change."

=== CU Boulder ===
As a faculty member in the University of Colorado Boulder's (CU Boulder) Department of Ecology and Evolutionary Biology in 2014, Suding began leading the Niwot Ridge Long-Term Ecological Research (LTER) program. She was shortly thereafter elected a Fellow of the Ecological Society of America (ESA) for advancing the science of ecology. In 2017, Suding established the Boulder Apple Tree Project to explore the identity and history of apple varieties in Boulder and the surrounding area in the hopes of improving future urban agricultural planning.

During her tenure at the University of Colorado Boulder, Suding established the Suding Lab to "apply cutting-edge "usable" science to the challenges of restoration, species invasion, and environmental change in partnership with conservation groups, government agencies and land managers." In 2018, she was recognized for her work with the ESA's Robert H. MacArthur award; an award given to an established, mid-career ecologist for meritorious contributions to ecology, in the expectation of continued outstanding ecological research. Following this, Suding was elected a fellow of the American Association for the Advancement of Science for her "scientifically significant or socially distinguished efforts to advance science or its applications." She also earned the University of Colorado Boulder's Excellence in Research, Scholarly and Creative Work Award. In 2019, Suding was recognized as one of the world's most influential researchers of the past decade.

During the COVID-19 pandemic, Suding was appointed a Distinguished Professor of ecology and evolutionary biology. She was also named a 2020 Professor of Distinction in the College of Arts and Sciences.

== Personal life ==
Suding is married to Paul Suding.
