= Mercedes Pascual =

Uruguayan theoretical ecologist

- Born: Uruguay
- Education: Universidade Santa Úrsula (USU), Pontifical Catholic University of Rio de Janeiro (PUC), Universidad de Ciencias Exactas y Naturales, New Mexico State University, Massachusetts Institute of Technology, Woods Hole Oceanographic Institution
- Awards: Robert H. MacArthur Award, James S. McDonnell Foundation Centennial fellowship
- Scientific career
- Fields: Theoretical ecology and epidemiology
- Workplaces: University of Chicago, University of Michigan, University of Maryland, Princeton University
- Doctoral advisor: Hal Caswell

Mercedes Pascual is an Uruguayan-Argentine-Brazilian theoretical ecologist, and a professor in the Department of Ecology and Evolution at the University of Chicago, where she leads the Laboratory for Modeling and Theory in Ecology and Epidemiology (MATE). She was previously the Rosemary Grant Collegiate Professor at the University of Michigan and a Howard Hughes Medical Institute Investigator.

Pascual has developed systems models for the study of complicated, irregular cycles in ecosystems, using mathematical, statistical and computational approaches. She applies these models to the study of food webs, ecology, and epidemiology, in particular the evolution of infectious diseases.

She has discovered relationships between El Niño climate patterns and the occurrence of cholera outbreaks in Bangladesh. One of the patterns she reports is that El Niño episodes are becoming an increasingly-strong driver of disease outbreaks. Her work may be the first quantitative evidence to show global climate change effecting an infectious disease. Other diseases that she studies include malaria and influenza. Her models can be used predictively in support of public health.

== Education ==
Pascual was born in Uruguay and grew up in Argentina and Brazil. Her father was a chemical engineer. Pascual did undergraduate work in marine biology and mathematics at Universidade Santa Úrsula (USU, 1978–1979) and at Pontifical Catholic University of Rio de Janeiro (PUC, 1980). She received her Licentiate degree in biology from the Universidad de Ciencias Exactas y Naturales in Buenos Aires, Argentina in 1985. She received an M.Sc. in mathematics from New Mexico State University in Las Cruces, New Mexico in 1989.

Pascual earned her Ph.D. in biological oceanography from a joint program of Massachusetts Institute of Technology and Woods Hole Oceanographic Institution, attending from 1989 to 1995. She worked with Hal Caswell. Her thesis was on Some Nonlinear Problems in Plankton Ecology. She did postdoctoral work at Princeton University from 1995 to 1997.

== Career ==
In addition to other positions, Pascual held an assistant professorship at the University of Maryland from 1997 to 2000. She joined the University of Michigan as an assistant professor in the newly created department of Ecology and Evolutionary Biology in 2001. She was an associate professor from 2004 to 2008, and the Rosemary Grant Collegiate Professor from 2008 to 2014. In addition, Pascual was a Howard Hughes Medical Institute Investigator from 2008 to 2015. As of 2015, Pascual became a professor in the Department of Ecology and Evolution at the University of Chicago.

== Awards and honors ==
In 1996, Pascual received the U.S. Department of Energy Alexander Hollaender Distinguished Postdoctoral Fellowship to study at Princeton University. She received a Centennial fellowship from the James S. McDonnell Foundation in 1999. In 2002, Discover magazine recognized Pascual as one of the 50 most important women in science. Pascual received the 2014 Robert H. MacArthur Award from the Ecological Society of America.

Pascual is a member of the American Association for the Advancement of Science, and served on its board of directors from 2015 to 2019. She was elected a Fellow of the Ecological Society of America in 2015. In 2019, she was elected to the American Academy of Arts and Sciences.

== Publications ==
- Pascual, Mercedes; Dunne, Jennifer A. (2006). Ecological networks : linking structure to dynamics in food webs. Oxford University Press. ISBN 9780195188165.
- Pascual, Mercedes (2001). "Scales that matter: untangling complexity in ecological systems". In Fitzpatrick, Susan M.; Bruer, John T. (eds.). Carving our destiny : scientific research faces a new millennium. Washington, D.C.: J.H. Press. ISBN 9780309068482.
