= Sukachev Institute of Forest =

Russian scientific institute

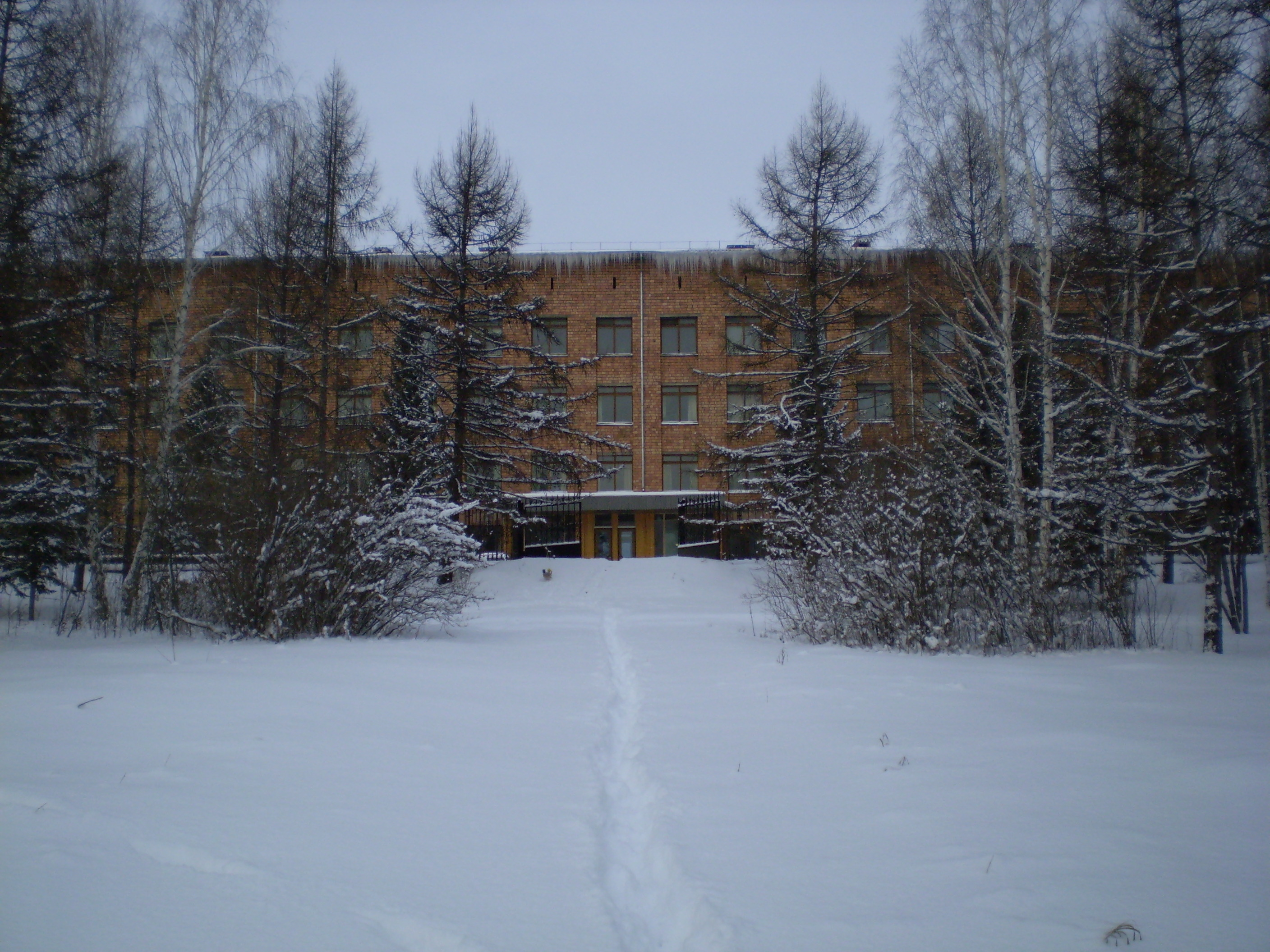
- Type: Forestry
- Established: 1944
- Location: Russia, Krasnoyarsk, Russia
- Website: www.forest.akadem.ru/

The Institute of Forest of the Siberian Division of the Russian Academy of Sciences is the first academic institution of a forest profile in Russia. It was founded in 1944 in Moscow by native biologist academician Vladimir Nikolayevich Sukachev. The institute was named after him in 1967. In 1959 the institute was assigned to the Siberian Division of the Academy of Sciences of the USSR and transferred to Krasnoyarsk.

== History ==
In various years the institute was headed by academicians V.N.Sukachev (1944-1959), A.B.Zhukov (1959-1977), and A.S.Isayev (1977-1988). Since 1994 the institute has been headed by academician Y.A.Vaganov. The library of the institute is a depository of scientific literature on the forest themes for the regions of Siberia and Far East.

== Academics ==
The structure of the institute (4 departments, 10 laboratories and a branch in Novosibirsk) provides development of fundamental and applied research in a wide range: biospherical role, ecologic functions and biodiversity of forest ecosystems, monitoring of their condition, and rational use of forest resources.

The scientific schools formed at the Institute: taiga forestry and productivity of forests, permafrost forestry, taxation and forest exploitation, forest morphology, cartography, aerospace information usage, forest genetics and selection, pyrology, zoology, microbiology, physiology and biochemistry of wood plants, dendrology and dendroclimatology and other spheres of forest biological science are the basis for mutual investigations with the scientists of the United States, Canada, England, Germany, Italy, Switzerland, Belarus, Sweden, Norway, Finland, Japan, China, Korea, Mongolia.

In the activities of the Institute a great place is taken by investigations in the forests of Lake Baikal started on the initiative of academician A.B.Zhukov yet in the early 1970s. For a number of years the institute has been developing application methods of information coming from flying vehicles (planes, satellites) to estimate condition of forest cover of taiga zone under the impact of anthropogenic and natural factors.

== Recently ==
Continuation of this work nowadays is the development of the technique of woodstand taxation and morphology structure investigation on the basis of laser, digital photo and video survey, digital satellite survey and three-dimensional taxational computer analysis of images.

In cooperation with foreign scientists the Institutes is working out the system approach to forest management with the help of GIS technologies and databases characterizing the main components of forest biocenoses. Long-term investigations of Siberian forests are reflected in more than 450 books and collections of papers of the Institute employees.
