= Bray–Curtis dissimilarity =

Statistical measure of biodiversity difference

In ecology and biology, the Bray–Curtis dissimilarity is a statistic used to quantify the dissimilarity in species composition between two different sites, based on counts at each site. It is named after J. Roger Bray and John T. Curtis who first presented it in a paper in 1957.

The Bray-Curtis dissimilarity $BC_{jk}$ between two sites j and k is

$$BC_{jk} = 1 - \frac{2C_{jk}}{S_j + S_k} = 1 - \frac{2\sum_{i=1}^{p}min(N_{ij},N_{ik})}{\sum_{i=1}^{p}(N_{ij} + N_{ik})}$$

where $N_{ij}$ is the number of specimens of species i at site j, $N_{ik}$ is the number of specimens of species i at site k, and p the total number of species in the samples.

In the alternative shorthand notation $C_{jk}$ is the sum of the lesser counts of each species. $S_j$ and $S_k$ are the total number of specimens counted at both sites. The index can be simplified to 1-2C/2 = 1-C when the abundances at each site are expressed as proportions, though the two forms of the equation only produce matching results when the total number of specimens counted at both sites are the same. Further treatment can be found in Legendre & Legendre.

The Bray–Curtis dissimilarity is bounded between 0 and 1, where 0 means the two sites have the same composition (that is they share all the species), and 1 means the two sites do not share any species. At sites with where BC is intermediate (e.g. BC = 0.5) this index differs from other commonly used indices.

The Bray–Curtis dissimilarity is directly related to the quantitative Sørensen similarity index $QS_{jk}$ between the same sites:

$$\overline{BC}_{jk} = 1 - QS_{jk}$$.

The Bray–Curtis dissimilarity is often erroneously called a distance ("A well-defined distance function obeys the triangle inequality, but there are several justifiable measures of difference between samples which do not have this property: to distinguish these from true distances we often refer to them as dissimilarities"). It is not a distance since it does not satisfy triangle inequality, and should always be called a dissimilarity to avoid confusion.

== Example ==
Example aquarium data
Species	Tank 1	Tank 2	Min
Goldfish	6	10	6
Guppy	7	0	0
Rainbow fish	4	6	4
Total	17	16	10

For a simple example, consider the data from two aquariums with 3 species in them, as shown in the table. The table shows the number of each species in each tank, as well as some statistics needed to compute the Bray-Curtis dissimilarity.

To calculate Bray–Curtis, let's first calculate $C_{jk}$, the sum of only the lesser counts for each species found in both sites. Goldfish are found on both sites; the lesser count is 6. Guppies are only on one site, so the lesser count is 0 and will not contribute to the sum. Rainbow fish, though, are in both, and the lesser count is 4. So $C_{jk} = 6 + 0 + 4 = 10$.

$S_{j}$ (total number of specimens counted on site j) $= 6 + 7 + 4 = 17$, and

$S_{k}$ (total number of specimens counted on site k) $= 10 + 0 + 6 = 16$.

This leads to $BC_{jk} = 1 - (2 \times 10) / (17 + 16) = 0.39$.
