= Robert H. MacArthur Award =

Award conferred by the Ecological Society of America

The Robert H. MacArthur Award is a biennial prize given by the Ecological Society of America to ecologists for their pivotal contributions to their field. The acceptance speeches of many recipients have been given at the annual meeting of the society and subsequently published in the ESA's journal, Ecology.

The following is a self-descriptive quote taken from the Robert H. MacArthur Award page on the ESA's website: "The Robert H. MacArthur Award is given biennially to an established ecologist in mid-career for meritorious contributions to ecology, in the expectation of continued outstanding ecological research. Nominees may be from any country and need not be ESA members. The recipient is invited to prepare an address for presentation at the annual meeting of the society and for publication in Ecology."

== Recipients ==
Source: ESA

- 1983 Robert Treat Paine, United States
- 1984 Robert McCreadie May, United Kingdom
- 1986 Thomas W. Schoener, United States
- 1988 Simon Asher Levin, United States
- 1990 William W. Murdoch, United States
- 1992 Peter M. Vitousek, United States
- 1994 Henry Miles Wilbur, United States
- 1996 David Tilman, United States
- 1998 Robert V. O'Neill, United States
- 2000 Stephen R. Carpenter, United States
- 2002 James H. Brown, United States
- 2004 May Berenbaum, United States
- 2006 Alan Hastings, United States
- 2008 Monica Turner, United States
- 2010 Stephen W. Pacala, United States
- 2012 Anthony Ragnar Ives, United States
- 2014 Mercedes Pascual, Uruguay/Argentina/Brazil
- 2016 Anurag A. Agrawal, United States
- 2018 Katharine N. Suding. United States
- 2020 Jonathan M. Levine, United States
- 2022 Priyanga Amarasekare, United States
- 2024 Kathleen Treseder, United States

== See also ==
- List of ecology awards
