= Monica Turner =

American ecologist

Monica G. Turner
- Education: Fordham University (B.S) University of Georgia (Ph.D)
- Scientific career
- Fields: Ecology
- Workplaces: University of Wisconsin–Madison

Monica G. Turner is an American ecologist known for her work at Yellowstone National Park since the large fires of 1988. She is currently the Eugene P. Odum Professor of Ecology at the University of Wisconsin–Madison.

== Life and career ==
Turner was raised in the suburbs of Long Island just outside New York City. Her father was a self-employed lawyer and her mother was a Girl Scouts executive. Turner obtained her B.S in Biology summa cum laude from Fordham University in 1980. Turner went on to receive her Ph.D. in Ecology from the University of Georgia.

After finishing her Ph.D., she stayed at the University of Georgia as a postdoctoral researcher. She worked with Eugene P. Odum to examine the changes in land use in the Georgia landscape, one of the earliest US landscape ecology studies.

In 1986, together with Frank Golley, Turner helped organize the first American meeting for landscape ecology. In 1987, after completion of her postdoctoral research, Turner went on to become a staff scientist at the Oak Ridge National Laboratory. At Oak Ridge, Turner began a project on the spatial distribution of land use in forests of the southern Appalachian Mountains.

Throughout her career, Turner has published around 250 scientific papers.

== Work at Yellowstone ==
During her time at Oak Ridge, her group developed simulations important in modeling key concepts in landscape ecology, including predictions of species movement patterns, spread of disturbance, and the connectivity of habitats across landscapes. In 1988, Turner sought to find a landscape in which to study her model. After rejoining with fellow ecologist Bill Romme, an expert in Yellowstone fire-history, Turner was able to find the landscape she needed in the fire-ridden Yellowstone, in which more than one-third of the park had been burned.

The 1988 "summer of fire" made Yellowstone history. Early blazes, sparked in June by a combination of lightning and human activities, burned for several weeks without raising much concern. As the summer got hotter and drier, though, the situation quickly turned. In July, "we had active fires spread, but nothing that we hadn't previously experienced," recalls Roy Renkin, a Yellowstone biologist. "But then, here came August. ... Then things started to really pick up and go." Turner also examined the regrowth of lodgepole pine and other dominant tree species in the park. Turner and Romme began working in the park in the summer of 1989. With no funding, they recruited volunteer labor. Friends, former students, and family members pitched in when they could. Even Turner’s mother spent her two weeks of vacation in the park measuring burned trees.

Turner's work at Yellowstone gave insight into vegetation dynamics concerning changing disturbance regimes, vertebrate grazing, and soil-microbe nutrient interactions. After Yellowstone's stand-replacing fire in 2000, Turner found that relatively large amounts of ammonium depletion occurred during the first four years.

Turner’s work at Yellowstone, over a period of 25 years, has provided an insight unto the resiliency of ecosystems after major disturbances. Turner, on the future of ecological disturbances, stated ‘‘As we continue to deal with the effects of global warming, I think we are going to see an increasing frequency, severity, and range of disturbances, which will produce much more interaction.’’

== Current work ==
Turner's current research at the University of Wisconsin - Madison includes:

- Fire, vegetation and ecosystem processes in Yellowstone National Park
- Bark beetles, fire and salvage logging in the Greater Yellowstone Ecosystem
- Landscape dynamics and ecological change in the Southern Appalachians
- Land-water interactions in north temperate landscapes
- Tools and resources for landscape ecology

== Awards ==
Turner has received multiple awards for her work in ecology. In 2003, she received the International Association for Landscape Ecology’s Distinguished Scholarship Award. In 2004, she was elected into the National Academy of Sciences. In 2008, she earned both an award and a prize, receiving the Ecological Society of America’s Robert H. MacArthur Award and the International Ecology Institute’s Prize in Terrestrial Ecology. From 2015 to 2016, she was the president of the Ecological Society of America. Most recently, she was awarded the Benjamin Franklin Medal (Franklin Institute) in 2021.

== Books ==
- Landscape Heterogeneity and Disturbance
- Quantitative Methods in Landscape Ecology
- Landscape Ecology in Theory and Practice (co-authored with R.H. Gardner and R.V. O'Neill)
- Learning Landscape Ecology: A Practical Guide to Concepts and Techniques (co-authored Gergel, S.E.)
- Ecosystem Function in Heterogeneous Landscapes (co-authored Lovett, G.M., C.G. Jones and K.C. Weathers)
- Foundation Papers in Landscape Ecology (co-authored with Wiens, J.A., M.R. Moss and D. J. Mladenoff)
