= Alan Hastings =

American theoretical ecologist

- Born: United States
- Education: Cornell University
- Awards: Fellow of the National Academy of Sciences; Fellow of the American Academy of Arts and Sciences; Robert H. MacArthur Award
- Scientific career
- Fields: Ecology
- Workplaces: University of California, Davis
- Doctoral advisor: Simon A. Levin

Alan Matthew Hastings is a mathematical ecologist and distinguished professor in the Department of Environmental Science and Policy at the University of California, Davis. In 2005 he became a fellow of the American Academy of Arts and Sciences and in 2006 he won the Robert H. MacArthur Award.

In 2008, he founded the journal Theoretical Ecology, in which he currently holds the position of editor in chief. Formerly, he was co-editor in chief of the Journal of Mathematical Biology. His research expands through many areas in theoretical ecology including spatial ecology, biological invasions, structured populations, and model fitting.

== Academic career ==
Alan Hastings published his first paper, dealing with eliminating viability differences in computing recombination percentages, in 1972 at the age of 19. This was the beginning of an extensive career in theoretical and mathematical ecology, with Alan credited for another 333 publications since. He received his Bachelors of Science in mathematics from Cornell University the following year, and he would follow this up with a Masters in applied mathematics from Cornell in 1975. Alan finished his formal education with a Ph.D. in applied mathematics with minors in population ecology and population genetics from Cornell in 1977, with his dissertation being done on population biology modeling. He began a career in education in 1977 at Washington State University, where he worked as an assistant professor in the Department of Pure and Applied Mathematics for two years. In 1979, he began working as an assistant professor for the University of California, Davis, where he has been teaching ever since. Alan started off in the Department of Mathematics, and continued there between 1979 and 1989, becoming an associate professor in 1982, and a professor in 1985. In 1983, he also began working in the Department of Environmental Science, where he worked until 2019 when he became a distinguished professor emeritus. As of 2022 Hastings is an external professor at the Santa Fe Institute, a position held since 2018.

== Honors and awards ==
- Member, National Academy of Sciences (Elected 2015)
- Fellow, American Academy of Arts and Sciences (Elected 2005)
- Robert H. MacArthur Award, Ecological Society of America (2006)
- Faculty Research Lecturer, University of California, Davis (2006–2007)
- Fellow, Society for Mathematical Biology (Elected 2017, Inaugural Class)
- Fellow, Society for Industrial and Applied Mathematics (Elected 2013)
- Fellow, Ecological Society of America (Elected 2012, Inaugural Class)
- Fellow, American Association for the Advancement of Science (Elected 2005)
- Honorary Editor, Journal of Mathematical Biology (2011–)
- NSF Predoctoral Fellowship (1974–1977)
- Ford Foundation Fellowship for Engineering Research Relevant to Society (1973–1974)

== Bibliography ==
- Alan Hastings. (1997). Population biology: concepts and models. New York: Springer. ISBN 0387948627
