= James McGraw =

American ecologist

James (Jim) B. McGraw
- Born: June 10, 1956 (age 70); Columbus, Ohio
- Known for: Research on American Ginseng
- Scientific career
- Fields: Ecology
- Workplaces: West Virginia University

James (Jim) B. McGraw (born July 10, 1956, Columbus, Ohio) is an American ecologist and Eberly Professor of Biology at West Virginia University.

== Education ==
McGraw earned his B.S. in Biological Sciences from Stanford University in 1978 and his Ph.D. in Botany at Duke University in 1982. He is a plant population biologist, with specific interests in ecological and evolutionary responses of natural plant populations to regional and global environmental change.

== Research ==
McGraw's early work focused on how natural selection was responsible for sharp morphological differences among plant populations over short distances in the arctic tundra. This was followed by a series of studies demonstrating rapid evolution on the century time scale, investigated by germinating old viable seeds from tundra soils. Since 1998, his lab has focused on demographic and evolutionary studies of rapidly expanding invasive plants or species that are threatened with extinction due to human activities.

His lab is particularly known for its studies of American Ginseng (Panax quinquefolius L.), North America's premier wild-harvested medicinal plant species. His 2005 Science paper with graduate student Mary Ann Furedi documented overbrowsing of Ginseng by white-tailed deer as a serious threat to long-term population viability; the paper was featured on NPR’s "All Things Considered", Scientific American, National Geographic, and The New York Times. As a scientist and Aldo Leopold Leadership Program Fellow, he has been an advocate for communicating science to the public and policymakers.
