= Lee Kiddie =

Scotland international rugby league footballer

Personal information
- Full name: Lee Kiddie
- Born: 2 January 1975 (age 50)

Playing information
- Position: Scrum-half
Club
Years	Team	Pld	T	G	FG	P
≤1998–04	Whitehaven
Representative
Years	Team	Pld	T	G	FG	P
2003	Scotland	1

Lee Kiddie (born 2 January 1975) is a former professional rugby league footballer who played as a scrum-half in the 1990s and 2000s. He played at representative level for Scotland, and at club level for Whitehaven.

== Playing career ==
=== International honours ===
Lee Kiddie won a cap for Scotland while at Whitehaven in 2003.

=== Testimonial match ===
Lee Kiddie's testimonial match at Whitehaven took place in 2003.
