= Pedro Jordano =

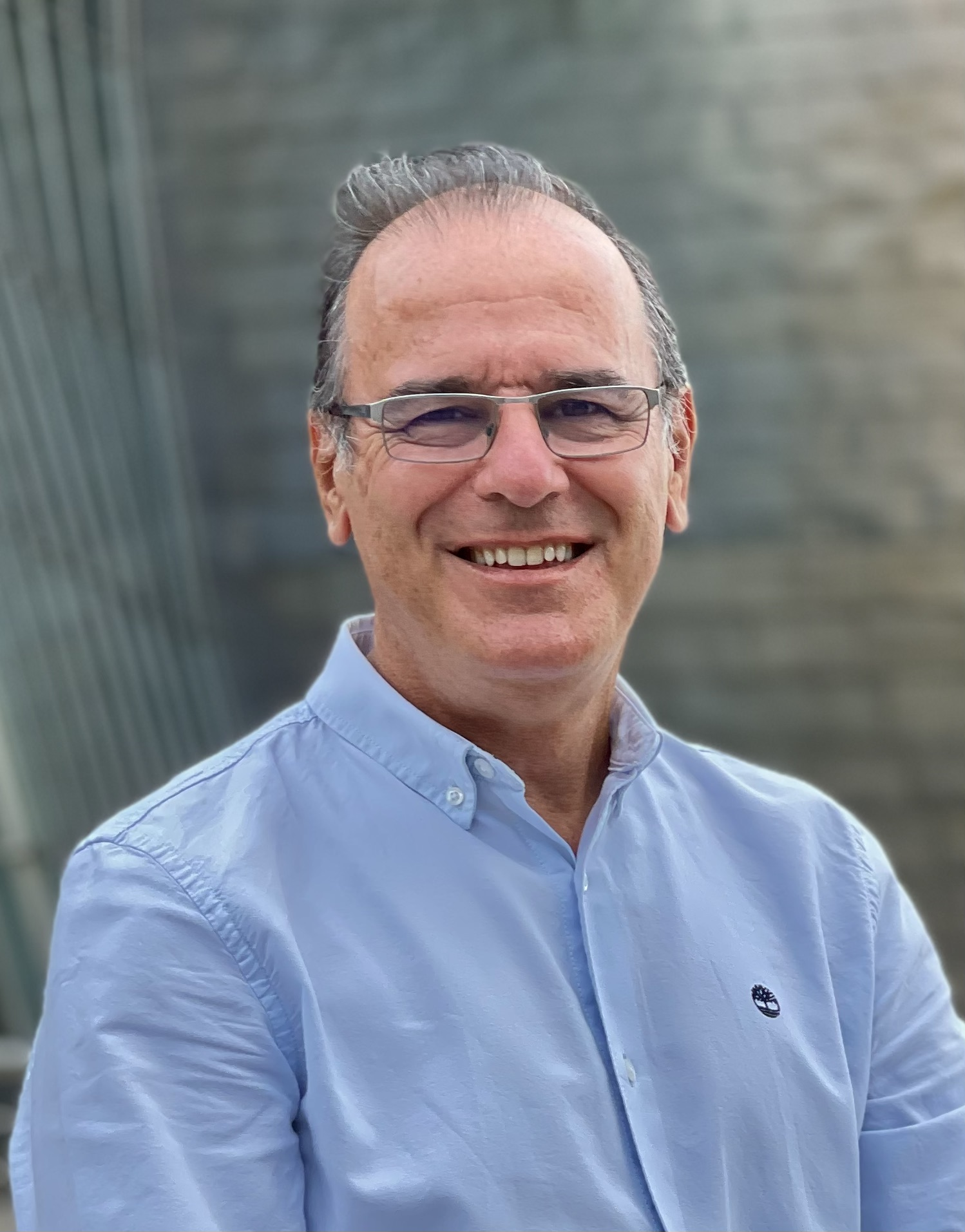
Pedro Jordano. 2021.

Pedro Diego Jordano Barbudo (born July 23, 1957, in Cordoba, Spain) is an ecologist, conservationist, researcher, focused on evolutionary ecology and ecological interactions. He is an honorary professor and associate professor at University of Sevilla, Spain. Most of his fieldwork is done in Parque Natural de las Sierras de Cazorla, Segura y Las Villas, in the eastern side of Andalucia, and in Doñana National Park, where he holds the title of Research Professor for the Estación Biológica Doñana, Spanish Council for Scientific Research (CSIC). Since 2000 he has been actively doing research in Brazil, with fieldwork in the SE Atlantic rainforest.

== Education ==
Jordano obtained his bachelor's degree in the University of Cordoba, 1979, in Spain, in Biology, Ecology and evolutionary biology. His Ph.D. is from the University of Sevilla, 1984, Spain where he focused on ecological and evolutionary consequences of mutualistic interactions between animals and plants.

== Professional appointments ==
His professional career started in 1987 as an Associate Researcher for the Spanish Council for Scientific Research (CSIC). In 1996 he was promoted to the position of Scientific Researcher, a position he held until 2004. From 1997 to 2002 he was also Scientific Coordinator for the Molecular Biology Laboratory at Estación Biológica de Doñana. In 2001 he became the Director of the Dept. of Evolutionary Biology, Estación Biológica de Doñana, CSIC. From 2004 to 2008 he was a representative in Eurocores EuroDiversity Program for the European Science Foundation. During the same time period he was the National Research Panel officer for the Biodiversity, Ecology and Global Change Program, Spanish Ministry of Education and Science. From 2008 to 2013 he was appointed a chair for the Spanish Panel for the National Research Plan, program of Biodiversity, Ecology and Global Change in Ministry of Economy and Innovation. Since 2018 he was appointed as president of the research area of Environmental Sciences within the Spanish State Research Agency (AEI). At present he holds two titles: Professor of Research for CSIC, and Chair of the Environmental Sciences and Technologies Program, State Research Agency (AEI), Ministry of Science, Universities, and Innovation, Spain. In 2019 he was appointed as an associate professor at the University of Sevilla, Department of Plant Biology and Ecology.

== Research ==
Jordano's research focuses in evolutionary ecology. His research focuses on the study of biological diversity (biodiversity) from both ecological and evolutionary perspectives. He is interested in how ecological interactions shape complex ecological systems. He is a field ecologist fascinated by natural history and evolution, using an interdisciplinary approach that bridges different fields (field ecology, genetics, modeling) to study complex biological systems. The main theme encapsulating his research is the coevolutionary process within complex ecological interactions networks in high-diversity systems: 1) dispersal processes, gene flow and demographic effects of interactions with pollinators and frugivores in plant populations; 2) coevolution in complex networks of mutualistic interactions; and 3) basic natural history and evolutionary ecology of ecological interactions.

His scientific achievements include incorporating complex network analysis in the study of patterns, functions, and consequences of plant-animal mutualisms within ecosystems. This has unveiled the highly diversified and low-specificity character of these interactions and represented a pathbreaking approach to the study of coevolution in mega-diversity systems such as tropical forests. In addition he has developed molecular tools to track and measure seed dispersal distances by frugivorous animals, and the identity of the frugivore species dispersing seeds. The approach is based on using maternally-derived tissue (i.e., endocarp) attached to the seed to characterize the maternal (source tree) genotype with microsatellite markers, and DNA-barcoding dispersed seeds to identify frugivore species (from DNA remains of the animal on the seed surface). This has represented a major conceptual and methodological advance in the study of dispersal systems, and a key innovation with far-reaching consequences in future developments that link population genetics, metapopulation ecology, and dispersal ecology.

Recent reviews of his work: Science [Thompson, J.N. 2006. Science, 312:372; Shea, K. 2007. Science, 315: 1231; Sudgen, A.W. 2011. Science 333: 1201], Nature [Renner, S. 2007. Nature, 448: 877; May, R.M. et al. 2008. Nature, 451: 893], and Current Biology [Pannell, JR. 2007. Current Biology, 17: R360].

Current research projects include components of pollination effectiveness and their consequences in insular pollinator assemblages, ecological correlates of interaction in complex plant-animal mutualistic networks and ecological networks in a fragmented world. Here they are:

- González-Varo, Juan P.; Arroyo, Juan M.; Jordano, Pedro (2014-06-30). "Who dispersed the seeds? The use of DNA barcoding in frugivory and seed dispersal studies". Methods in Ecology and Evolution. 5 (8): 806–814. doi:10.1111/2041-210x.12212. ISSN 2041-210X.

This paper is intended to take DNA samples of defecated or regurgitated seeds to determine which animals are spreading the seeds. And with that, explain long-distance dispersal, safe-delivery of seeds and colonization to new sites.

- Bascompte, Jordi; Jordano, Pedro (December 2007). "Plant-Animal Mutualistic Networks: The Architecture of Biodiversity". Annual Review of Ecology, Evolution, and Systematics. 38 (1): 567–593. doi:10.1146/annurev.ecolsys.38.091206.095818. hdl:10261/40177. ISSN 1543-592X.
- Jordano, Pedro; Bascompte, Jordi; Olesen, Jens M. (2002-12-13). "Invariant properties in coevolutionary networks of plant-animal interactions". Ecology Letters. 6 (1): 69–81. doi:10.1046/j.1461-0248.2003.00403.x. ISSN 1461-023X.

A complete list of publications can be found here: PJordano Lab.

=== Doñana Biological Station ===
Dr. Pedro Jordano holds the title of research professor at the Doñana Biological Station, the highest position for any researcher at the Spanish Scientific Council, CSIC. His most recent research project is an ongoing study named "Dispersal by animal frugivores and area expansion in plants: a study with multilayer networks". By using field work at different stands along a natural colonization front of expanding juniper populations, the project assesses experimentally how plants expand and colonize new areas due to diversified interactions with frugivore seed dispersers; and how biotic interaction networks are re-shaped along colonization fronts.

== Honors and awards ==
- 2018 National Research Award "Alejandro Malaspina" in the area of Environmental Sciences and Technologies. Spanish Ministry of Science, Innovation, and Universities.
- 2018 Premio Ecosistemas-Luis Balaguer. Spanish Ecological Society.
- 2016 British Ecological Society, Marsh Award (best book in Ecology) for Mutualistic networks (Princeton Univ. Press), 2014, co-authored with J. Bascompte.
- 2014 Rey Jaime I Award, Environmental Conservation, in its XXVII edition. 2014. This is the most prestigious scientific award in Spain, with an international jury including 18 Nobel laureates. Awarded by the Generalitat de Valencia.
- 2008 Mercer Award, Ecological Society of America; for a paper co-authored with J. Bascompte and J.M. Olesen ("Asymmetric coevolutionary networks facilitate biodiversity maintenance". 2006, Science 312: 431–433).
- Others: 2018
- 2019 *Hijo Adoptivo (Forster son)* of Triana (Sevilla). Civil recognition received from the Sevilla City Hall and Triana District. 2009–present. Honorary professor. University of Sevilla, Spain.

Member of the editorial boards for: *Annual Reviews of Ecology, Evolution, and Systematics*; *PLoS Biology*; *Perspectives in Plant Ecology, Evolution, and Systematics*; *Journal of Evolutionary Biology*; *Movement Ecology*; and former member of the advisory board of *Ecography* and *Oikos*.

== Selected publications ==
- Jordano, P., Forget, P.M., Lambert, J.E., Böhning-Gaese, K., Traveset, A., and Wright, S.J. 2011. Frugivores and seed dispersal: mechanisms and consequences for biodiversity of a key ecological interaction. Biology Letters 7: 321–323.

This paper discusses the consequences of losing frugivores as seed dispersers due to extinction and anthropogenic factors.

- Jordano, P. 2010. Pollen, seeds, and genes: the movement ecology of plants. Heredity 105: 329–330.This is a comment on Richard Ennos' 1994 paper in Heredity: [Ennos RA (1994). Estimating the relative rates of pollen and seed migration among plant populations. Heredity 72: 250–259.]

This paper discuss how plants 'move' through pollen dispersal. The dispersal of plant by pollen grains or seeds, affects genetic patterns because it pinpoints the demographic regeneration process that depends on successful establishment of new individuals.

- Jordano, P. 2007. Frugivores, seeds and genes: analysing the key elements of seed shadows. Pages 229–251 in: Dennis, A., Green, R., Schupp, E.W., and Wescott, D. (eds.). Frugivory and seed dispersal: theory and applications in a changing world. Commonwealth Agricultural Bureau International, Wallingford, UK.

Seed shadows are the spatial distribution a seed is traveled from its parent tree. Jordano et al. used this element to determine the relationship between plant-animal.

- Jordano, P., Bascompte, J. and Olesen, J.M. 2006. The ecological consequences of complex topology and nested structure in pollination webs. In: Waser, N.M. and J. Ollerton (eds.). Specialization and generalization in plant-pollinator interactions. University of Chicago Press, EEUU. Pages: 173–199.

This document intends to demonstrate how many pollinator interaction are not specific, thus not having tight mutualism. However, some interactions are very specific between pollinator and plant. The forever debate between generalization and specialization.
