= Constant Martiny =

Belgian Intelligence agent

- Born: 1888; Houffalize, Belgium
- Died: 26 August 1942 (aged 53–54); Berlin, Germany
- Spouse(s): Anne Marie Irène, née Tinant
- Relatives: Marie Louise Elias-Martiny (daughter) Rene Elias (son-in-law)
- Military career
- Branch: Royale Union des Services de Renseignement et d'Action
- Rank: Captain (posthumous)
- Unit: Renseignement et d'Action (A.R.A.)
- Conflicts: World War II
- Awards: Chevalier of the Order of Leopold

Constant Louis Martiny CdeG(B) (1888–1942) is regarded as one of the first Belgian Intelligence agents. An early member of the Belgian Resistance, posthumously, he was made a Chevalier of the Order of Leopold.

== Early life and career ==
Constant Martiny was born in 1888 in Houffalize, Belgium. He was the son of a tailor, Jules Alexis Martiny. Having completed his primary education, he secured employment as a postal clerk. Later, Martiny was employed as a civil servant within the Belgian Civil Aeronautic Administration that was headed by Colonel Joseph Daumerie.

== Belgian war service ==
in 1940, during the early part of World War II, Martiny was evacuated to England as part of the Belgian Civil Aeronautic Administration. Subsequent contact with members of the British Special Operations Executive saw him, after brief training, parachute back into Belgium with Edmond Desnerck on 12 October 1940 to initiate a Belgian-British intelligence network in the service of the Belgian government in exile. Martiny co-founded with Colonel Joseph Daumerie, the Martiny-Daumerie intelligence network (later the Martiny-Daumerie-Cleempoel network) that was active during 1940-1941 and had, at one time, approximately 300 operatives. The network included Martiny's wife Irene, daughter, Marie Louise Elias-Martiny and son-in-law, Rene Elias.

On 13 May 1941, Martiny was captured by the Germans during clandestine radio transmissions. Paperwork captured at the time contributed to the further arrest and trial of 22 individuals connected to the extended Martiny-Daumerie network including 22-year-old Red Cross nurse, Suzanne Vervalcke and Martiny's wife Irene. Vervalcke's death sentence was commuted by Hitler to imprisonment. 10 members were incarcerated in the Saint-Gilles prison and later imprisoned in Moabit Prison, Lehrter Strasse, Berlin. After trial, the following network operatives were executed in 1942:

- Colonel Joseph Daumerie
- Constant Martiny
- Rene Elias
- Edgard Cleempoel
- Jules Doudelet
- Radio Operator Louis Fermeus
- Gilbert Beckers
- François Verbelen
- Marcel Legrain
- Jules André

== Family ==
Martiny married Anne Marie Irene Tinant (called Irene) in 1912 and they had 7 children. Irene Tinant-Martiny, for her role in the Martiny-Daumerie intelligence network, was imprisoned in Mauthausen and later died of typhus after transfer to Bergen-Belsen concentration camp (via Ravensbrück concentration camp) on 23 April 1945 shortly after the camp's liberation. For her services to Belgium during the war, Irene Tinant-Martiny was posthumously made Adjutant of the Renseignement et d'Action (A.R.A.) and awarded:

- Croix de chevalier of the Order of Leopold II with Palm and Croix de Guerre 1940 with Palm with the following citation:

"Dedicated herself, without reservation, within an intelligence and action department, to the unyielding struggle against the enemy. Achieved in full satisfaction of its leaders the dangerous missions with which she was charged. Arrested and deported to Germany, died there in Bergen-Belsen, April 23, 1945"

- Commemorative Medal of the 1940–45 War
- Medal of the Armed Resistance.

== Posthumous military honours ==
- Captain of the Renseignement et d'Action (A.R.A.)
- Croix de chevalier of the Order of Leopold with Palm and Croix de Guerre 1940 with Palm; with the following citation:

" When he arrived in Great Britain, he spontaneously offered to accomplish a special mission in the occupied territory where he was returned in 1941. He has shown great qualities of courage and a sovereign contempt for danger. Arrested by the enemy, was shot on August 26, 1942, a victim of his ardent patriotism"

- Commemorative Medal of the 1940–45 War
- Medal of the Armed Resistance.
- King's Medal for Courage.

== Bibliography ==
- Alfred Dubrou "Constant Martiny (1888 - 1942) fondateur du réseau de renseignement Martiny-Daumerie" Quarterly Bulletin of the Archeological Institute of Luxembourg Arlon 1982
- Alfred Dubru "Constant Martiny : il y a cinquante ans, le 12 octobre 1940, un Houffalois était le premier agent belge parachuté en Belgique occupée" Houffalize : Haut Pays, 1991.
- L. Gunther Moor, W. Vanderplasschen, A. van Dijk "Politie en gezondheidszorg" (CPS 2016 - 3, nr. 40) 2016, p242
- "Houffalize: Justice tardive de l'histoire Constant Martiny" Ardennes Magazine Edition No 76 Judi 3 November 1994
- Robin Liefferinckx et al. (eds.) "Het schaduwleger: L’Armée de l’ombre" 2020 p361
- Etienne Verhoeyen "Missions britanniques et réseau Martiny-Daumerie', in: Jours de chagrin 2, Jours de guerre 6, Bruxelles, 1992, p. 7-18
- Etienne Verhoeyen "België bezet 1940-1944. Een synthese" Brussel, 1993.
- Herman Van De Vijver, Rudi Van Doorslaer, Etienne Verhoeyen "België in De Tweede Wereldoorlog" Deel 6. Het Verzet 2, 1988
