= Jim Keddie =

Australian rules footballer, born 1906

Personal information
- Full name: Jim Keddie
- Born: 31 May 1906
- Died: 13 October 1984 (aged 78)
- Original team: Brunswick
- Height: 173 cm (5 ft 8 in)
- Weight: 79 kg (174 lb)
- Position: Wing / Half Forward

Playing career^{1}
Years	Club	Games (Goals)
1927–31	St Kilda	65 (3)
- ^{1} Playing statistics correct to the end of 1931.

Jim Keddie (31 May 1906 – 13 October 1984) was a former Australian rules footballer who played with St Kilda in the Victorian Football League (VFL).
