= Ramensky (inhabited locality) =

Ramensky (Russian: Раменский; masculine), Ramenskaya (Раменская; feminine), or Ramenskoye (Раменское; neuter) is the name of several inhabited localities in Russia.

Urban localities

- Ramenskoye, Moscow Oblast, a town in Ramensky District of Moscow Oblast

Rural localities

- Ramensky, Kaluga Oblast, a settlement in Mosalsky District of Kaluga Oblast
- Ramensky, Kirov Oblast, a settlement in Burmakinsky Rural Okrug of Kirovo-Chepetsky District of Kirov Oblast
- Ramensky, Moscow Oblast, a settlement in Kulikovskoye Rural Settlement of Dmitrovsky District of Moscow Oblast
- Ramenskoye, Krasnoyarsk Krai, a village in Kirikovsky Selsoviet of Pirovsky District of Krasnoyarsk Krai
- Ramenskoye, Tver Oblast, a village in Rzhevsky District of Tver Oblast
