= Erik Martiny =

Erik Martiny (born 11 June 1971) is a Franco-Irish-Swedish novelist, academic, translator and journalist who teaches at the Lycée Henri-IV in Paris. His reviews on art and literature have appeared in The Times Literary Supplement, The London Magazine, The Cambridge Quarterly, Whitewall Magazine and Aesthetica Magazine.

== Early life ==
Martiny was born in the city of Cork in Ireland, and grew up speaking French, English, Swedish and Italian. He studied at Bishopstown Community School and University College of Cork.

== Reception ==
Martiny's book The Pleasures of Queueing was widely and favourably reviewed. In 3 am Magazine, Peter Harris praised it as "hilarious and vivid", arguing that Martiny's "witty self-conscious distance allows him to shamelessly contextualize the bizarre into familial banality. […] Martiny makes all of these graphic descriptions enjoyable rather than just gross by maintaining both a comic distance and linguistic virtuosity." He concluded that "One lovely quality of the novel is its generosity and compassion towards almost everyone".

Eamon Maher in The Irish Times, wrote "Martiny can definitely spin a yarn and has a gift for comedy".

Josephine Fenton in The Irish Examiner opined: “Lee Jenkins loves this novel saying that it is ‘hilarious and heartfelt in equal measure’ and that it is a ‘story of bohemia and bountiful creation with the verve and verbal inventiveness of early Philip Roth’. Some accolade. But hers is a brilliant assessment of the novel.” Philip Coleman had this to say in Litro Magazine: “one of the most candid literary autobiographies ever written […] it is undoubtedly one of the funniest narratives to be written in recent years about growing up and coming-of-age in the south of Ireland […] By the time the reader gets to this point in Martiny's highly entertaining and fast-paced narrative, one realises that it is, for all of its comic high jinks, an intellectually engaged and engaging work […] a novel that seems destined to become some kind of cult classic."

In World Literature Today, Edward Ouesslin summarized Ne soyez pas timide in the following terms: “The writer and director Jean Cocteau takes center stage during much of the oversized subplot, initiating a young and very shy narrator into a world of drugs (mostly opium), sex, and bizarre social experiments (including living as a panhandler), all of which is presumably designed to shatter the narrator’s bourgeois inhibitions and guide him, however harshly and awkwardly, toward his emergence as a full-fledged writer. The middle-aged Cocteau as a literary mentor and sexual initiator to inexperienced young men is more than plausible. The rest of the novel is an exercise in Rabelaisian humor, alternating between learned disquisitions and outlandishly disgusting sexual and/or scatological encounters.”

== Published works ==
=== Fiction ===
- Himmler and the Handmaid (2024)
- Bloodberry (2024)
- Cocteau's Invitation (2023) [Translated from Ne soyez pas timide]
- L'indélicatesse (2023)
- The Pleasures of Queueing (2018) ISBN 1732009112
- Ne soyez pas timide (2019) ISBN 2363712900
- Night of the Long Goodbyes (2020)
- Crown of Beaks (2021)
- Waiting for Gaudiya and Other Stories (2021)
- The Moose, the Mouse, and the Little Irish Boy (2021)

=== Academic works ===
- Intertextualité et filiation paternelle dans la poésie anglophone (2008)
- Lolita: From Nabokov to Kubrick and Lyne (ed) (2009)
- A Companion to Poetic Genre (ed) (2011)
- Le commentaire de textes (2018)
- L’anglais en prépas (2019)
- The Importance of Being Earnest, Classics & Co, Lycée. (2020)
