= Jennifer Martiny =

American ecologist

Jennifer Bellanca Hughes Martiny
- Education: University of California, San Diego; Stanford University
- Scientific career
- Workplaces: University of California, Irvine; Technical University of Denmark; Stanford University
- Thesis: From populations to ecosystems studies on the distribution, importance, and loss of biodiversity (1999)
- Website: Martiny Lab

Jennifer B. H. Martiny is an American ecologist who is a professor at the University of California, Irvine. Her research considers microbial diversity in marine and terrestrial ecosystems. In 2025 she was elected a Fellow of the American Academy of Arts and Sciences.

== Early life and education ==
Martiny studied as an undergraduate at the University of California, San Diego. It was here that she first became interested in ecology, including studying tropical biology and conservation abroad in Costa Rica. After graduating with her bachelor's degree, she joined Stanford University as a graduate student, studying conservation biology with Paul Ehrlich and Gretchen Daily. Her doctoral research considered the distribution and loss of biodiversity. Martiny stayed at Stanford as a postdoctoral researcher with Brendan Bohannan, where she started working on microorganisms.

== Research and career ==
Martiny studies the ecology and evolution of microbial communities (microbiomes) generally, but particularly in soil. She focuses on the mechanisms that create and maintain microbial diversity, and how this diversity impacts the functioning of ecosystems. She started her independent scientific career at Brown University, where she established her own laboratory in 2000. Here she built on her work to quantify microbial diversity patterns in the environment and began to study the biogeographic patterns of bacteria.

In 2006 Martiny moved to the University of California, Irvine (UCI). Martiny serves as co-Director of the UCI Center for Microbiome Science with Katrine Whiteson. She has investigated the impact of drought on the microbial diversity of soil. She was announced as a visiting professor at the Technical University of Denmark in 2020.

== Awards and honours ==
- 2005 Gordon and Betty Moore Foundation
- 2011 National Academy of Sciences Kavli Frontiers of Science Fellow
- 2012 VELUX Visiting Professor to Copenhagen University
- 2017 Elected Fellow of the Ecological Society of America
- 2017 Elected Fellow of the American Society for Microbiology
- 2017 University of California, Irvine Chancellor's Fellow
- 2020 Elected Fellow of the American Association for the Advancement of Science
- 2025 Elected to the American Academy of Arts and Sciences

== Selected publications ==
- Whitmore, T. C.; Santisuk, T. (1989). "Putting Thailand on the Map-Almost!". Journal of Biogeography. 16 (5): 495. doi:10.2307/2845112. ISSN 0305-0270. JSTOR 2845112.
- Baho, Didier L.; Peter, Hannes; Tranvik, Lars J. (2012-04-19). "Resistance and resilience of microbial communities - temporal and spatial insurance against perturbations". Environmental Microbiology. 14 (9): 2283–2292. Bibcode:2012EnvMi..14.2283B. doi:10.1111/j.1462-2920.2012.02754.x. ISSN 1462-2912. PMID 22513226.
- Hughes, Jennifer B.; Hellmann, Jessica J.; Ricketts, Taylor H.; Bohannan, Brendan J. M. (2001-10-01). "Counting the Uncountable: Statistical Approaches to Estimating Microbial Diversity". Applied and Environmental Microbiology. 67 (10): 4399–4406. Bibcode:2001ApEnM..67.4399H. doi:10.1128/AEM.67.10.4399-4406.2001. ISSN 0099-2240. PMC 93182. PMID 11571135.
