= William W. Murdoch =

- Born: United Kingdom
- Education: University of Glasgow, University of Oxford
- Known for: Population regulation, predator–prey dynamics, biological control
- Awards: Guggenheim Fellowship, Robert H. MacArthur Award, and AAAS Fellow
- Scientific career
- Fields: Population Ecology
- Workplaces: UC Santa Barbara
- Doctoral advisor: Charles Sutherland Elton

William W. Murdoch (born 1939) is a Charles A. Storke II professor of population ecology at the University of California, Santa Barbara. Over the years, his research has focused primarily on the subjects of population regulation, predator–prey dynamics, and biological control. He has also contributed extensively to understanding the scientific and socioeconomic ramifications caused by human overpopulation and environmental degradation. He was the recipient of the 1990 Robert H. MacArthur Award granted by the Ecological Society of America. He is a member of the National Academy of Sciences (NAS), the American Association for the Advancement of Science (AAAS), and the Ecological Society of America (ESA).

== Education ==
William W. Murdoch received his Bachelor of Science degree in zoology (with honors) at the University of Glasgow. After graduation, he headed to the University of Oxford to study insect population dynamics at the Bureau of Animal Population under Charles Sutherland Elton. Upon obtaining his doctorate in population ecology, Murdoch won a Guggenheim Fellowship that allowed him to undertake postdoctoral research at the University of Michigan-Ann Arbor.

== Professional Appointments ==
In 1965, Murdoch joined the faculty of the University of California, Santa Barbara, where he has conducted research until the present. He has held visiting professorships at various universities around the world including the University of California, Berkeley, the University of Michigan-Ann Arbor, and University College London. Murdoch has also been a McMaster Fellow in Australia, a Miller Research Professor at the University of California, Berkeley, director of the University of California Natural Reserve System, and editor in chief of the journal Issues in Ecology.

== Research ==
Murdoch's main research studies focus on understanding what regulates populations in abundance. He is interested in the mechanisms that maintain the stability of interacting consumer and resource populations when the consumer keeps the resource population far below the level set by its resources. His research objective is to develop models of particular systems, do experiments to understand these systems and test these models, as well as to develop more general theory. Two experimental systems are used in Murdoch's research: the Aphytis-California Red Scale and daphnia-algae systems. Murdoch's work in biological control has been instrumental in demonstrating that stability of parasitoid-host interactions in pest control can be achieved by non-equilibrium mechanisms. For example, his examination of the parasitoid-host relationship between Aphytis and the California red scale has elucidated that stability does not arise from metapopulation dynamics and that the regulating mechanism may, instead, lie in size-related interactions, in small-scale spatial heterogeneity, or mixtures of these mechanisms.

== Selected books ==
Poverty of Nations

In The Poverty of Nations: the Political Economy of Hunger and Population, Murdoch concludes that populations are irresponsibly expanding in a finite world and that this has put the planet at risk of exhausting its resources and of destroying its fundamental life support systems. The great challenge ahead, he notes, will be to make possible the control of population size and growth. A bottom-up approach, nonetheless, will be required to ensure success in this task. Profound changes to the sociopolitical infrastructure of the less developed countries must be achieved, with joint cooperation from the developed world, to guarantee that high fertility is no longer the inevitable outcome of the conditions in which people live in poor nations.

Environment

In Environment, William W. Murdoch synthesizes a collection of environmental studies aimed at instructing new generations of ecology students. He was prompted to work on the subject by an over accumulation of data that resulted from the public’s growing interest on environmental problems of the day. The scope of his study focuses primarily on the interplay of science, technology, human values, and institutions that make environmental science not only fascinating, but also relevant to the evolving sociopolitical dynamics of our world. This 1975 book demonstrates how Murdoch’s general theories on population ecology and environmental science were starting to shape up and presents an opportunity for comparison to later works and perspectives.

== Selected articles ==
Murdoch, W.W., Chesson, J., and Chesson, P.L. 1985. Biological control in theory and practice. The American Naturalist 125: 344–366.
Murdoch, W. W. 1994. Population regulation in theory and practice. Ecology 75: 271–287.
Murdoch, W. W., Luck, R.F., Swarbrick, S.L., Walde, S., Yu, D.S., and Reeve, J.D. 1995. Regulation of an insect population under biological control. Ecology 76: 206–217.
Murdoch, W. W. and Briggs, C.J. 1996. Theory for biological control: Recent developments. Ecology 77: 2001–2013.
Murdoch, W. W., Briggs, C.J., and Swarbrick, S.L. 2005. Host suppression and stability in a parasitoid-host system: experimental demonstration. Science 309: 610–613.

== Awards and honors ==
Award	Granting Institution
Guggenheim Fellowship	J. S. Guggenheim Memorial Foundation

President's Award	American Society of Naturalists
R. H. MacArthur Award	Ecological Society of America

Huffaker Medal in Population Biology	UC Berkeley
AAAS Fellow	American Academy of Arts and Sciences

Highly Cited Researcher	Institute for Scientific Information
Faculty Research Lecturer	UC Santa Barbara

Distinguished Scientist Award	International Organization for Biological Control
Fellow (2012)	Ecological Society of America
