= David L. Gaveau =

Landscape ecologist

- Gaveau in January 2026
- Occupations: Landscape ecologist and entrepreneur

Academic background
- Education: B.Sc., Applied Physics; M.Sc., Applied Optics; Ph.D., Biodiversity Management
- Alma mater: Kingston University; Imperial College London; University of Kent

David L. Gaveau is a landscape ecologist and entrepreneur. He is the founder and managing director of The TreeMap.

Gaveau's research has focused on understanding how human activities are changing the Earth's surface, especially tropical forests, and how these changes interact with climate change. His studies have employed satellite imagery and field investigations to analyze deforestation, fires, agricultural expansion, and the environmental consequences of globally traded commodities including palm oil, pulp and paper, rubber, and mining.

== Education ==
Gaveau received a B.Sc. in Applied Physics from Kingston University and completed an M.Sc. in Applied Optics at Imperial College London in 1995. Later, he completed a Ph.D. in Biodiversity Management from the University of Kent in 2009.

== Career ==
Gaveau worked for three years as a higher scientific officer at the UK Centre for Ecology & Hydrology. Later, he joined the Wildlife Conservation Society Indonesia Program, where he worked as a landscape ecologist from 2002 to 2007. From 2009 to 2012, he worked with Living Landscapes Indonesia and Stanford University. Additionally, he joined the Center for International Forestry Research, where he worked as a senior scientist from 2012 to 2017 and as a senior associate from 2017 to 2020.

Gaveau worked as the scientific director of SIPEF Biodiversity Indonesia from 2009 to 2014, and also worked as a consultant at the Wildlife Conservation Society Cambodia Program. He became the founder and managing director of The TreeMap and also founded the Nusantara Atlas.

== Research ==
Gaveau's work has explored how human land-use practices, especially large-scale agriculture, drive tropical forest change and environmental degradation in Southeast Asia. His research has examined how deforestation and selective logging transformed forests over time. He has assessed the expansion of large-scale agriculture, such as oil palm and pulp and paper plantations. He also developed an atlas to track how palm oil and paper companies contributed to Borneo’s deforestation. Moreover, he has used satellite data to show how much deforestation in Borneo was driven by conversion to industrial plantations.

With other researchers, Gaveau has studied forest degradation, as well as peatland fire occurrence in Southeast Asia and the Siberian Arctic. His findings showed how human factors, including small landholders and industrial plantations, together with environmental conditions such as drought and rising temperatures influenced fire activity.

Gaveau has highlighted the use of supply chain tracking and remote sensing to improve monitoring of forest and land-use change, as well as spatial analysis to examine fire patterns. He has explored local communities' perceptions of forest ecosystem services and land-cover change. In addition, he has explored illegal encroachment in protected areas, the impacts of moratoriums, commodity prices on deforestation rates, and the role of post-logging interventions in reducing forest loss and preventing land-use conversion.

== Controversies ==
In 2020, Gaveau was ordered to leave Indonesia by immigration authorities after officials alleged that he had violated visa regulations under the country's updated science law. The action followed the publication of wildfire estimates by the Center for International Forestry Research (CIFOR), which reported a larger burned area than official government figures, leading to disputes over methodology and scientific independence.
