= Stephanie Peay =

British ecologist and crayfish researcher

- Stephanie Peay at Pisek crayfish conference.
- Born: 1959 (age 66–67)
- Education: University of Edinburgh; University of Hull
- Scientific career
- Fields: Ecology
- Workplaces: University of Leeds

Stephanie Peay (born 1959) is a British ecologist and crayfish researcher. Peay is a leading proponent of crayfish conservation and management in Britain and has produced much of the guidance on crayfish used by British ecologists and managers on survey and monitoring methods, restoration of habitat, mitigation during works on waterbodies, and, latterly, on "ark sites" to safeguard white-clawed crayfish.

== Early life and education ==
Peay graduated in biological sciences from the University of Edinburgh, and in 1998 was awarded a Master of Science from the University of Hull. In 2013 she was awarded a PhD by the University of Leeds.

== Career ==
In her early professional career, she worked for the Trust for Nature Conservation in Sussex, and in 1984, compiled the first draft of the ancient woodland inventory for West Sussex. In 1985, she was appointed by the Farming and Wildlife Advisory Group as a conservation officer in Lincolnshire.

In 1990, she began working for Cobham Resource Consultants, later part of the Scott Wilson Group, as an ecological consultant, where her interests in the white clawed crayfish, Austropotamobius pallipes and signal crayfish, Pacifastacus leniusculus began. During her time with Cobham Resource Consultants, she led what was described as "the largest ecological study of a river in the UK", investigating the River Ouse for Yorkshire Water.

As an independent crayfish researcher, Peay's research has concentrated on the protection of the UK native white clawed crayfish and restricting the invasion of the alien signal crayfish. She is a leading proponent of crayfish conservation and management in Britain; her guidance on crayfish was published by English Nature and the Environment Agency, and used by British ecologists and managers on survey and monitoring methods and restoration of habitat (Peay 2002, Peay 2003). She has also published guidance on mitigation during works on waterbodies, and, latterly, on "ark sites" to safeguard white-clawed crayfish (Peay, Whitehouse and Kindemba, 2009). She also provides advice for organisations such as the Wildlife Trusts, Scottish Natural Heritage, BBC and others.

As invading signal crayfish are a major threat to native crayfish, both in Britain and in Europe, Peay has studied the effects of signal crayfish on white clawed crayfish and their environment, particularly on native fish stocks, and has researched control and eradication methods.

She represented The Wildlife Trusts on the UK Biodiversity Action Plan Steering Group for white clawed crayfish, was a board member of the International Association of Astacology and has contributed to the European CRAYNET programme.

In her employment as Associate Director, Ecology with Aecom, Peay had considerable experience of ecological surveys, ecological assessment and management in a range of habitats in the UK on many types of projects, notably in water resources, development roads and airports.

She was a visiting lecturer at the University of Leeds. She is also member of the Institute of Ecology and Environmental Management and a Chartered Environmentalist.

== Works ==
- Peay S. (July 2002). "Guidance on Habitat for White-clawed crayfish and its restoration". Environment Agency Technical Report W1-067/T, ISBN 1844320820
- Peay, Stephanie (2003). Monitoring the White-clawed crayfish (Austropotamobius pallipes) (PDF). English Nature. ISBN 1-85716-727-9.
- Peay S. (2004). "A cost-led evaluation of survey methods and monitoring for White-clawed crayfish". Bull. Fr. Pêche Piscic. (372–373): 335–352. doi:10.1051/kmae:2004008.
- Peay S. et al. (2006). "Biocide treatment of ponds in Scotland to eradicate signal crayfish". Bulletin Français de la Pêche et de la Pisciculture (380–381). Scottish Natural Heritage: 1363-1379. doi:10.1051/kmae:2006041. ISSN 1961-9502.
- Peay, S. Whitehouse, A. & Kindemba, V. (2009). Ark sites for White-clawed crayfish – guidance for the aggregates industry (PDF). Buglife. ISBN 978-1-904878-95-7.
- Peay S. et al. (2009). "The impact of signal crayfish (Pacifastacus leniusculus) on the recruitment of salmonid fish in a headwater stream in Yorkshire, England". Knowledge and Management of Aquatic Ecosystems (394–395): 394–395. doi:10.1051/kmae/2010003.
- Peay, Steph. 2022. White-Clawed Crayfish: Advice for Making Planning Decisions. Natural England.
