= Dwight Billings =

American ecologist

William Dwight Billings
- Born: December 29, 1910; Washington, D.C.
- Died: January 4, 1997 (aged 86); Durham, North Carolina
- Scientific career
- Fields: Ecology

William Dwight Billings (December 29, 1910 – January 4, 1997) was an American ecologist. He was one of the foundational figures in the field of plant physiological ecology and made major contributions to desert and arctic/alpine ecology.

Billings served as president of the Ecological Society of America (ESA) from 1978 to 1979. He was elected a Fellow of the American Academy of Arts and Sciences in 1979. In 1962, ESA granted him the Mercer Award, for an outstanding research paper by a researcher under the age of 40; ESA also awarded the Eminent Ecologist Award in 1991.

== Career chronology ==
His advisees include Robin B. Foster.

== Other sources ==
- Arctic and Alpine Research, Vol. 29 (1997): 253-254.
- Contemporary Authors, Vol. 113 (1985).
- Bulletin of the Ecological Society of America, Vol. 78(2) (1997): 115-117.
- Arctic, Vol. 50(3) (1997): 275-276.
