= Robin B. Foster =

American ecologist

- Education: Dartmouth College, Duke University
- Scientific career
- Fields: Ecology
- Workplaces: University of Chicago, Field Museum of Natural History
- Thesis: Seasonality of fruit production and seedfall in a tropical forest ecosystem in Panama (1973)
- Doctoral advisor: Dwight Billings
- Doctoral students: Phyllis Coley

Robin B. Foster is a botanist studying tropical forests. He co-originated the "tropical forest dynamics plot".

== Biography ==
Foster graduated from Dartmouth College in 1966 with a Bachelor of Science in biology, and attained his Botany / Plant Ecology PhD in 1974 at Duke University under ecologist Dwight Billings. In 1979, while at the University of Chicago, work on Barro Colorado Island with frequent coauthor Stephen P. Hubbell contributed to the development of the first tropical forest dynamics plot, leading to a global network of 18 such parcels. The "audacious" plan was to periodically map and measure every tree within 50 hectares (120 acres). As a plant ecologist with Conservation International he participated in studies to inform urgent conservation decisions as part of the first "Rapid Assessment Program". During his extensive fieldwork in Peru, he contracted both malaria and hepatitis. He has taught biology at the University of Chicago and served as a staff biologist at the Smithsonian Tropical Research Institute. At the Field Museum he founded the Live Photos of Plants project and Rapid Reference Collection. In 2013, Foster was elected an honorary fellow of the Association for Tropical Biology and Conservation (ATBC).

== Selected publications ==
- Hubbell, S. P., R. B. Foster, and S. T. O’Brien. (1999). "Light-Gap Disturbances, Recruitment Limitation, and Tree Diversity in a Neotropical Forest". Science. 283 (5401): 554–557. doi:10.1126/science.283.5401.554. PMID 9915706.
- Foster, Robin B. (1982). "The seasonal rhythm of fruitfall on Barro Colorado Island". The Ecology of a Tropical Forest-seasonal Rhythms and Long-term Changes. Smithsonian Institution Press: 151–172.
- Parker III, Theodore A. (1994). The Tambopata-Candamo Reserved Zone of Southeastern Perú: A Biological Assessment (PDF). Washington, DC: Conservation International. p. 2.
