= Thomas W. Schoener =

American ecologist (born 1943)

Thomas William Schoener (born August 9, 1943) is an American ecologist and professor at University of California, Davis. He received a B.A. (Summa Cum Laude, Junior Eight) in 1965 and a Ph.D. in 1969 from Harvard University, where he subsequently was a Junior Fellow, assistant and associate professor. He worked at Harvard University and the University of Washington before moving to Davis. He is an expert in community ecology and in evolutionary ecology, including experimental manipulation of island vertebrate and spider communities. Schoener's research has been both theoretical and empirical.

He was the 1986 recipient of the Robert H. MacArthur Award given by the Ecological Society of America and in 2012 was one of their inaugural Fellows. Schoener was elected to the United States National Academy of Sciences in 1984 and the American Academy of Arts and Sciences in 1991. He received the Henry S. Fitch Award for Excellence in Herpetology in 2011.
