= Frank Golley =

American ecologist (1930–2006)

Frank Benjamin Golley III
- Born: September 24, 1930; Chicago, Illinois, U.S.
- Died: October 6, 2006 (aged 76); Athens, Georgia, U.S.
- Education: Purdue University (B.S., 1952); Washington State University (M.S., 1954); Michigan State University (Ph.D., 1958)
- Scientific career
- Fields: Ecology
- Workplaces: University of North Carolina; University of Georgia
- Thesis: Energy dynamics of a food chain of the old-field community (1958)
- Doctoral advisor: Don W. Hayne

Frank Benjamin Golley III (September 24, 1930 – October 6, 2006) was an American ecologist. A graduate of Purdue University, Washington State University and Michigan State University, where he earned a Doctor of Philosophy degree in 1958, Golley joined the faculty of the University of Georgia in 1958. He was the director of the Savannah River Ecology Laboratory from 1962 to 1967, the director of Environmental Biology at the National Science Foundation from September 1979 to September 1981, and director of the Institute of Radiation Ecology at the University of Georgia from 1984 to 1987. He was the founding editor of the journal Landscape Ecology, and wrote more than forty books on ecology.

== Biography ==
Frank Benjamin Golley III was born in Chicago, Illinois, on September 24, 1930. His father managed a steel mill. He earned a Bachelor of Science degree in agriculture from Purdue University in 1952 and a Master of Science degree in wildlife management from Washington State University in 1954. He then earned a Doctor of Philosophy degree from Michigan State University in 1958, writing his dissertation on "Energy dynamics of a food chain of the old-field community" under the supervision of Don W. Hayne.

After graduation, Golley was an assistant professor at the University of North Carolina until September 1958, when he moved to the University of Georgia, where he would remain until 2000. He was the director of the Savannah River Ecology Laboratory from 1962 to 1967, the director of Environmental Biology at the National Science Foundation from September 1979 to September 1981, and director of the Institute of Radiation Ecology at the University of Georgia from 1984 to 1987. His doctoral students included Monica Turner.

In January 1986, Golley became founding editor of the journal Landscape Ecology, which he edited until 1996. He was president of the US chapter of International Association for Landscape Ecology (IALE), and received its Distinguished Landscape Ecologist Award in 1990 for his contribution to the field of landscape ecology in North America, and its Outstanding Service Award in 1998 for his service as editor of Landscape Ecology.

He wrote more than forty books on ecology. Among them was his A History of the Ecosystem Concept in Ecology (1993), he wrote about the history and evolution of the academic study of ecology. In his later work, A Primer for Environmental Literacy (1998), he attempted to make ecology accessible to a general audience.

Golley died in Athens, Georgia, on October 2006. His papers are held the by University of Georgia.
