= Kiddie =

Kiddie may refer to:

- Child
- The Kiddie, a Japanese visual kei rock band
- "Kiddie", a song by White Ash from Quit or Quiet
- Script kiddie or skiddie

== People ==
- Alex Kiddie (1927-2021), Scottish footballer
- Andrew Kiddie (1889–1964), South African World War I officer and flying ace
- Graeme Kiddie (born 1970), British rugby player
- Habib Ali Kiddie (1929–1982), Pakistani field hockey player
- Lee Kiddie (born 1975), British rugby player
- Nor Kiddie (1897-?), British performer

== See also ==
- Kidde, a fire protection equipment manufacturer
