= Paul Keddy =

Canadian ecologist

Paul Anthony Keddy

Personal details
- Born: 29 May 1953 London, Ontario
- Died: 26 December 2023 (aged 70)

Paul Anthony Keddy (born May 29, 1953 in London, Ontario) was a Canadian ecologist. He studied plant population ecology and community ecology in wetlands and many other habitats in eastern Canada and Louisiana, United States.

He began his formal training in biology in 1969 at York University in Toronto and finished his PhD at Dalhousie University with Evelyn C. Pielou. He was a professor of biology for 30 years, first at the University of Guelph (1978–1982), then the University of Ottawa (1982–1999) and then held the Edward G. Schlieder Endowed Chair for Environmental Studies at Southeastern Louisiana University (1999 to 2007). He published over 150 scholarly articles, wrote seven books, and edited two books. He was designated a Highly Cited Researcher by Clarivate (formerly the Institute for Scientific Information)., He received the National Wetlands Award for Science Research in 2007 from the Environmental Law Institute. Although he worked on many types of plant communities and a broad array of ecological questions, the focus of his work was on the principles that organize plant communities, with particular emphasis upon wetlands.

== Books ==
Synthesis was one of Paul Keddy's major contributions to wetland ecology and plant ecology. His first book, Competition, won both the George Lawson Medal of the Canadian Botanical Association and the Henry Allan Gleason Award of the New York Botanical Garden. A second edition of Competition was published in 2001.

A major area of research for Keddy, ecological assembly rules (the constraints (rules) on community formation and maintenance (assembly), was the topic of his co-edited synthesis Ecological Assembly Rules: Perspectives, Advances, Retreats.

In 2006 Keddy was honoured by the Society of Wetland Scientists with the Merit Award for Wetland Ecology: Principles and Conservation. A new edition of Wetland Ecology was published in 2010. This textbook is used in courses around the world. In 2005 he focused on the world's largest wetlands which had not previously been described, ranked or compared, and co-edited The World's Largest Wetlands: Ecology and Conservation.

In 2007, he published Plants and Vegetation: Origins, Processes, Consequences, a textbook on plant ecology.

His later books for Cambridge University Press included Plant Ecology (2017), A Framework for Community Ecology (2021), and a third edition of Wetland Ecology: Principles and Conservation (2023).

In addition to scientific writing, Keddy prepared guides to the natural history of two regions of North America. For the State of Louisiana he authored Water, Earth, Fire: Louisiana's Natural Heritage. For Lanark County, Ontario, he wrote Earth, Water, Fire: An Ecological Profile of Lanark County. For this contribution Keddy was given a Champion of Nature Award (2008) by the Mississippi Valley Field Naturalists and the Lanark County Award of Excellence—Heritage and Ecology by the county (2009).
