= J. Roger Bray =

American ecologist (John Roger Bray; 1929–2018)

- Born: John Roger Bray; June 20, 1929; Belleville, Illinois, United States
- Died: April 25, 2018 (aged 88); Nelson, New Zealand
- Education: University of Illinois
- Occupation: Ecologist

John Roger Bray (June 20, 1929 – April 25, 2018) was an American-born ecologist known for his collaboration with John Thomas Curtis. The Bray–Curtis dissimilarity is jointly named after them.

Bray was born in 1929 to Roger H. Bray, who developed the Bray soil test. A native of Belleville, Illinois, the younger Bray was raised in Urbana, Illinois. Bray completed his bachelor's degree in botany at the University of Illinois in 1950, after three years of study. Bray began working toward a doctorate under John Thomas Curtis at the University of Wisconsin–Madison in August 1950. In 1955, Bray began teaching ecology at the University of Minnesota while working with Don Lawrence. In 1957, Bray joined the University of Toronto faculty. With Michael McNamee, Bray founded the Committee of 100 to oppose nuclear bomb testing. Bray resigned from his position at the University of Toronto in 1962, to protest the Canadian government placing nuclear weapons at present-day Iqaluit.

Bray married Gwendolyn J. Struik, daughter of mathematicians Dirk Jan Struik and Saly Ruth Ramler, in 1961. Following his resignation from Toronto, Bray and his wife moved to Kelowna, British Columbia. Soon after the Cuban Missile Crisis, both relocated to New Zealand in 1963, and began working for the Department of Scientific and Industrial Research. The couple have three daughters.
