= Carlos A. Peres =

Brazilian biologist (born 1963)

Carlos Augusto Peres
- Born: 1963 (age 62–63); Belém, Brazil
- Education: Federal University of Pará; Duke University; Robinson College, Cambridge
- Known for: Line transect studies Tropical forest conservation Brazil-nut study
- Awards: "Environmentalist Leader for the New Millennium" by Time magazine (2000) & "Biodiversity Conservation; Leadership Award" (1995)
- Scientific career
- Fields: Tropical conservation biology
- Workplaces: University of East Anglia

Carlos Augusto Peres (Portuguese: [ˈkaʁluz ɐwˈɡuʃtu ˈpɛɾiʃ]) (born 1963) is a Brazilian field biologist and conservation biologist who works in the Amazon rainforest and other neotropical forest regions. His research interests are in the large-scale patterns of large-bodied vertebrate diversity and abundance in Amazonian forests; the effects of different forms on human disturbance, including hunting, habitat fragmentation and wildfires, on Amazonian forest vertebrates; and reserve selection and design criteria in relation to regional gradients of biodiversity value and implementation costs. He co-directs three research programs on natural resource management in the eastern, southern and western Amazon basin focusing on the ecology of natural and heavily modified landscapes and their role in the retention of biodiversity.

== Biography ==
Peres was born in Belém, Brazil, and was exposed to Amazonian natural history from early childhood on his father's ranch in eastern Pará, which consisted largely of primary forest. Since 1982 he has been studying wildlife community ecology in Amazonian forests, the biological criteria for designing nature reserves, and the population ecology of resource management within and outside protected areas. He currently is involved in four conservation ecology research programs in different parts of Amazonia. He has published over 350 papers on neotropical forest ecology and conservation at scales ranging from single populations to entire regional landscapes. Peres was the co-editor with W.F. Laurance of the 2006 book Emerging Threats to Tropical Forests. He currently divides his time between Norwich, Aarhus and fieldwork in the Brazilian Amazon.

=== Academic posts ===
- Post-doctoral fellow at the Department of Zoology, Museu Paraense Emílio Goeldi in Belém (1991–92)
- Post-doctoral fellow at the Center for Tropical Conservation at Duke University in the US (1993)
- Assistant professor at the Department of Ecology of University of São Paulo (1993–95)
- Senior research associate at the Centre for Social and Economic Research on the Global Environment (CSERGE) at the University of East Anglia (1995–96)
- Lecturer at the School of Environmental Sciences at the University of East Anglia (1996–2002)
- Reader at the University of East Anglia (2002–08)
- Professor of Conservation Biology at the University of East Anglia (2008–present)
- Visiting professor of Conservation Biology at Aarhus University, Denmark (2018)

== Awards and recognition ==
In 1995 Peres received a "Biodiversity Conservation Leadership Award" and in 2000 he was named an "Environmentalist Leader for the New Millennium" by Time magazine.
