= John Thomas Curtis =

American ecologist and botanist (1913–1961)

John T. Curtis
- Born: September 20, 1913; Waukesha, Wisconsin
- Died: June 7, 1961 (aged 47)
- Resting place: Madison, Wisconsin
- Education: University of Wisconsin
- Known for: Bray-Curtis dissimilarity seminal papers on ecological gradient analysis
- Scientific career
- Fields: Ecology
- Workplaces: University of Wisconsin

John Thomas Curtis (September 20, 1913 – June 7, 1961) was an American botanist and plant ecologist. He is particularly known for his lasting contribution to the development of numerical methods in ecology. Together with J. Roger Bray, he developed the method of polar ordination (now known as Bray-Curtis ordination) with its inherent distance measure, the Bray-Curtis dissimilarity.

Curtis completed his Ph.D. in botany at the University of Wisconsin in 1937. He remained affiliated with that university for the remainder of his career, except through 1942–1945, when he served as research director of the Société Haïtiano-Américaine de Développement Agricole. Both in 1942 and in 1956, he was awarded Guggenheim Fellowships. In 1951 he was made full professor of botany at the University of Wisconsin.

The collective efforts of Curtis and the thirty-nine Ph.D. students that he managed to supervise during his relatively short career, resulted in the work The Vegetation of Wisconsin: An Ordination of Plant Communities, published 1959. This book remains one of the important contributions to the field of plant ecology during the twentieth century, and spawned the Wisconsin School of North American plant ecology.

He was also a "well-known contributor" to the Bulletin of the American Orchid Society.

== Selected scientific works ==
- A study of relic Wisconsin prairies by the species-presence method (with H. C. Greene). Ecology, 30 (1): 83–92. 1949. Full text
- The interrelations of certain analytic and synthetic phytosociological characters (with Robert P. McIntosh). Ecology, 31 (3): 434–455. 1950. Full text
- An upland forest continuum in the prairie-forest border region of Wisconsin (with Robert P. McIntosh). Ecology, 32 (3): 476–496. 1951. Full text
- An ordination of the upland forest communities of Southern Wisconsin (with J. Roger Bray). Ecological Monographs 27 (4): 325–349. 1957. Full text
- The Vegetation of Wisconsin: An Ordination of Plant Communities. University of Wisconsin Press, Madison. 1959.
