= Brendan Bohannan =

American microbial and evolutionary biologist

- Education: Michigan State University (PhD 1997)
- Awards: Humboldt Research Award from the Alexander von Humboldt Foundation
- Scientific career
- Fields: Microbial and evolutionary biology
- Institutions: Stanford University, University of Oregon
- Doctoral advisor: Richard Lenski

Brendan J. M. Bohannan is an American microbial and evolutionary biologist, whose research focuses on the cause and consequences of microbial diversity. He applies general ecological theory to organisms across diverse environments, ranging from built environments to animal-associate microbes, including those in humans. His research has been published in Nature, Science, Proceedings of the National Academy of Science, and other internationally known journals.

Bohannan is the James F. and Shirley K. Rippey Chair in Liberal Arts and Sciences at the University of Oregon, where is a professor in the Department of Biology and member of the Institute of Ecology and Evolution. He previously served as the university's director of the Institute of Ecology and Evolution and was also the Alec and Kay Keith Professor. Prior to this, Bohannan was a tenured Associate Professor in the Department of Biological Sciences at Stanford University. He earned his PhD from Michigan State University in 1997 under the mentorship of Richard Lenski.

He has been a co-principal investigator on research teams supported by multi-million dollar grants from the National Institutes of Health to explore the health benefits of microbes and to study how the microbiome influences social behaviors and vice versa.

Bohannan is a fellow of the Ecological Society of America, the American Academy of Microbiology, and the American Association for the Advancement of Science. In recognition of his research accomplishments, he is a recipient of the Humboldt Research Award from the Alexander von Humboldt Foundation. He was also in the inaugural class of Google Science Communication Fellows.
