= Peter Greig-Smith =

British botanist (1922–2003)

- Born: 1922
- Died: 2003 (aged 80–81)
- Education: University of Cambridge
- Scientific career
- Fields: Plant ecology; Quantitative methods
- Workplaces: University of Manchester; University of North Wales, Bangor
- Doctoral advisors: Alexander Watt

Peter Greig-Smith (1922–2003) was a British plant ecologist, founder of the discipline of quantitative ecology in the United Kingdom. He had a deep influence across the world on vegetation studies and plant ecology, mostly from his book Quantitative Plant Ecology, first published in 1957 and a must-read for multiple generations of young ecologists.

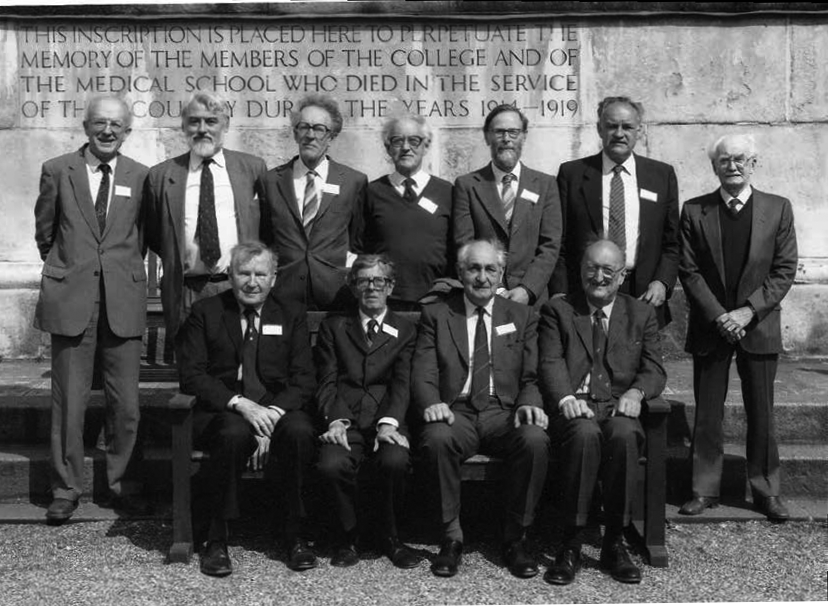
Jubilee Symposium for the 75th anniversary of the British Ecological Society at University College, London held on April 12–13, 1988. Past presidents gathered for a team photograph: Back row, left to right: A. D. Bradshaw, R. J. Berry, Peter Greig-Smith, A. Macfadyen, C. H. Gimingham, G. Dunnet, L. R. Taylor. Front row from left: C. H. Evans; P. R. Richards, J. Harley, R. Southwood.

In 1952, Greig-Smith was hired by the University College of North Wales at Bangor, Wales (now Bangor University), where he spent the rest of his academic career. His book Quantitative Plant Ecology spread the ideas of rigorous, quantitative ecological methods among the world’s research community, and made his lab at Bangor a magnet for plant biologists with an interest in mathematical and statistical methods. A stout supporter of Bangor’s graduate program in ecology, he recruited and advised many students and research collaborators from all continents.

A prominent member of the British Ecological Society, he was first elected to council in 1957, and in 1961 he became honorary secretary. He held this post until 1964, when he resigned to become editor of the Journal of Ecology, the society’s scientific publication. He remained as editor until 1968. In 1977, he was elected vice president of the society, and served as president in 1978 and 1979.

== Early work ==
Greig-Smith went to school in Birmingham, United Kingdom, before going to Downing College, Cambridge, where he was inspired by the teachings of Alexander S. Watt, the first British botanist to seriously study the phenomenon of pattern and scaling in plant communities from a quantitative perspective. Watt’s influence can be seen in Greig-Smith’s obituaries of him.

In 1944, after graduating from Cambridge, Greig-Smith went to the Imperial College’s Field Station at Slough, where he studied the effect of herbicides on oilseed crops under the direction of Geoffrey E. Blackman, founder of the science of selective herbicides in Britain. The Slough herbicide tests, part of Britain’s war effort, involved the planting of large-scale experiments with random block and nested designs, an experience that played a central role in nurturing Greig-Smith's interest in statistical methods and experimental plot designs.

In 1945, he moved to the University of Manchester as lecturer in botany. At Manchester, he cultivated a wide array of research interests, ranging from the taxonomy of liverworts and stinging nettles, the causes of spatial pattern in dune plants, the quantitative morphology and tussock formation of Ammophila arenaria (marram grass), and the biogeographic distribution of liverworts to understand the fate of vegetation in the British Isles during the last glaciation.

=== Dune ecology ===
Greig-Smith’s first published paper dealt with the varying growth forms of the dune grass Ammophila arenaria in calcareous sand dunes on the Isle of Harris, Outer Hebrides. This paper was followed two years later by a detailed description of the dune's plants, using quantitative methods to describe the plant community. These early papers already mark his interest for quantification of natural phenomena. In this morphometric analysis of Ammophila arenaria, for example, Greig-Smith measured in detail the internode length of the plant’s rhizomes and noted the species’ tendency to form tussock-like clumps in older dunes and longer, exploratory rhizomes in unstable, younger dunes.

=== Taxonomy and biogeography ===
Some of Greig-Smith’s early work was devoted to taxonomy and biogeography, trying to bring a quantitative approach to these branches of the biological sciences. Much of his taxonomic work was devoted to the evolutionary taxonomy and ecology of some liverworts (Lejeuneaceae).

In 1950, he published a synthesis paper on the taxonomy and biogeography of liverworts, as an early attempt to shed some light on the question of the effects of Quaternary glaciations on the history of the British flora. He tried to evaluate how many of the extant British liverworts had survived these glaciations in situ and how many, in contrast, were postglacial migrants from southern latitudes. This work as done almost two decades before the theory of glaciation refugia was proposed by Jürgen Haffer for the Amazon.

Greig-Smith also wrote a synthesis of the natural history of nettles of the United Kingdom with a detailed analysis of the plant communities where they prospered.

=== Tropical ecology ===
In 1940, Paul Richards, Sir Arthur Tansley, and Alexander Watt published a seminal paper on the classification of tropical rainforests revealing a fascination with the complexity of tropical vegetation that was halted by the war, but that Watt passed down later to Greig-Smith, his student at Cambridge.

In July 1948, Greig-Smith received a research grant from the Colonial Office to visit the island of Trinidad to study tropical rainforests. Encouraged by E. Ashby, an early pioneer of quantitative methods who was then professor of botany at Manchester, he left the university for six months to study secondary succession in Trinidad, in collaboration with colleagues of the Imperial College of Tropical Agriculture on the island. In order to try to unravel and explain this complexity, he developed novel statistical methods to test hypotheses on the association between species and the spatial pattern of saplings and adult trees in the field. An avid naturalist, he also developed in Trinidad a passion for orchids, which led him later to start cultivating his own orchid collection in the United Kingdom. After his visit to Trinidad in 1948, Greig-Smith drafted two detailed papers on secondary tropical forests.

The first study included a number of techniques that at that time were novel in vegetation analysis, such as the species-area plots developed by Ronald A. Fisher and Henry Gleason, size-specific survivorship, and quantitative floristic tables.

In the second Trinidad paper, he also used nested analyses of variance (ANOVAs), comparisons with the Poisson distribution, and variance-to-mean ratios to test and understand spatial patterns in the trees of the secondary forest. He concluded his paper questioning Frederic Clement’s concept of plant communities as complex supra-organisms, and in support of Gleason's individualistic model of plant communities.

== Bangor ==
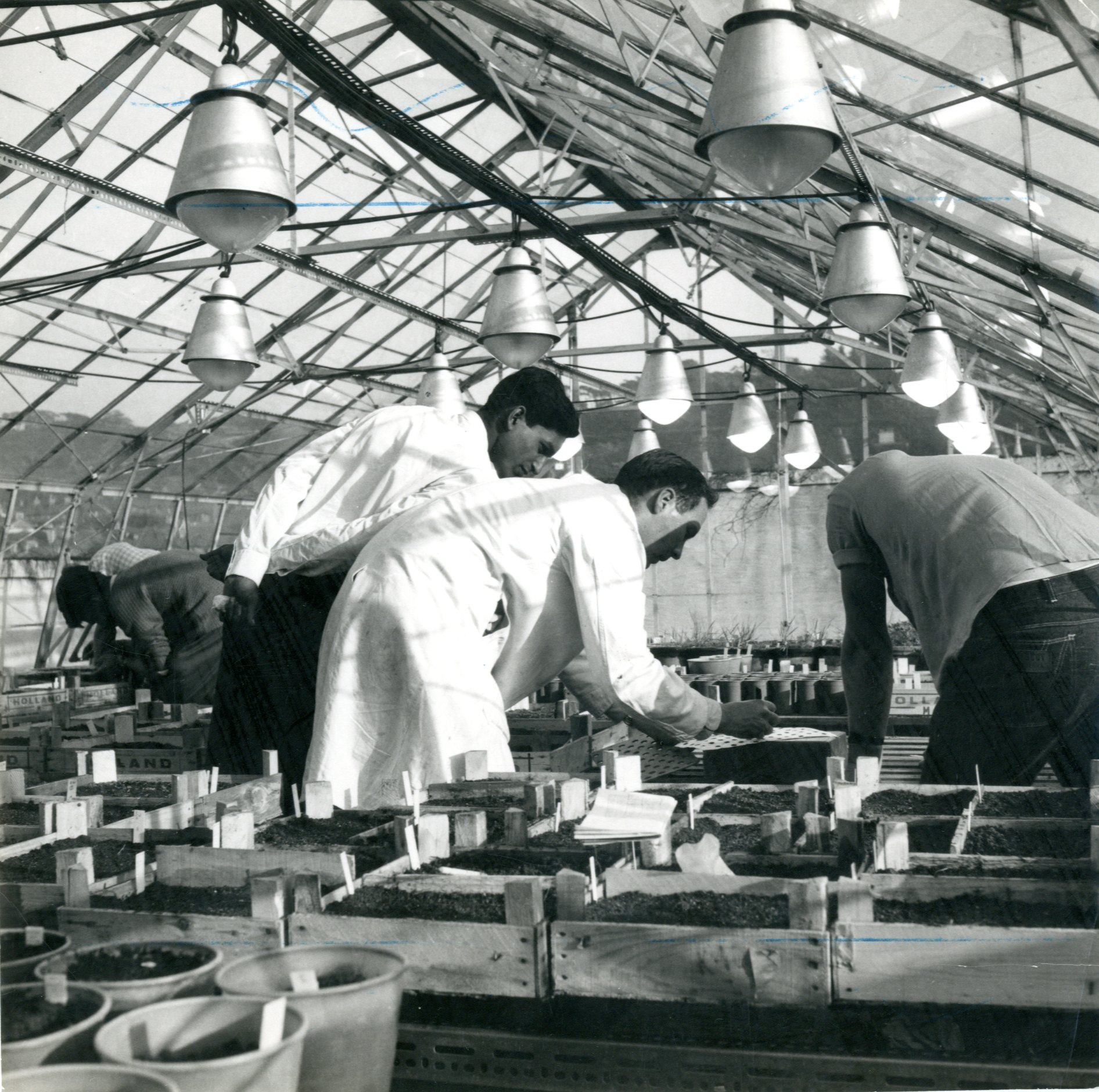
Greenhouses of the School of Plant Biology at Bangor in the mid-1970s. Photo courtesy of Bangor University.

In 1952, Greig-Smith moved to the University College of North Wales at Bangor, where he spent the rest of his career. After the publication of his book Quantitative Plant Ecology in 1957, which rapidly spread among the research community and became a success, Bangor became a magnet for plant biologists with an interest in quantitative methods. Greig-Smith was keenly interested in the MSc program in Ecology that Professor Paul W. Richards had developed at Bangor, and advised many Masters' students from where he recruited many doctoral students and research collaborators. The place was a haven for academic exchange: Laszlo Orlóci, a Professor of Ecology at the University of Western Ontario, Canada, recalls in his biographical memories that during 1964 alone, Greig-Smith's lab at Bangor received the visit of Robert Sokal and Peter Sneath, founders of the discipline of numerical taxonomy, and David Goodall, William T. Williams, and Mike Dale, who were creating initial content for a solid school of statistical ecology in Australia.

=== Pattern and scaling in ecological sciences ===
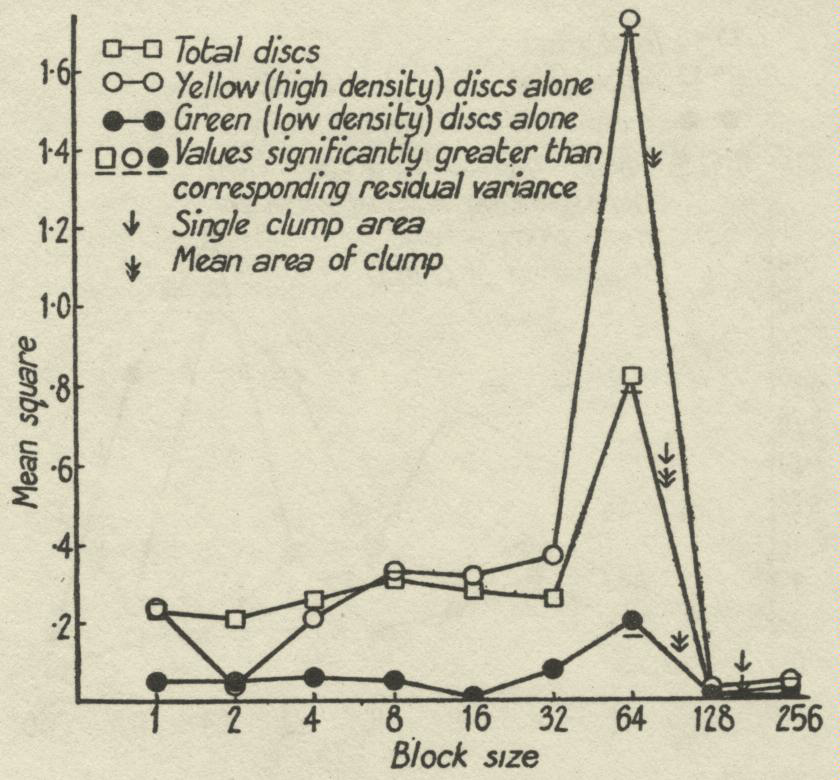
In the early 1950s, Greig-Smith started using graphs in which he plotted the variance in plant density versus the size of the sample plot, to find peaks that could identify clump size in aggregated distributions. In doing so, he realized that ecosystem properties are scale-dependent: a species can have a regular distribution at a given scale, but be highly clumped at another.

Greig-Smith was fascinated by the phenomenon of plant spatial pattern, defined by the question: why are some plants regularly spaced while others are densely clumped? He realized that plants could be clumped at a certain scale, but that those clumps, in turn, could be randomly, or even regularly distributed at larger scales. Patterns and processes in ecology, he concluded, can have different behaviors at different scale. Strongly influenced by his early experience in agricultural experiments using random blocks and nested designs, he sought to answer this question by using, as his core tool, a series of quadrats nested within each other at different scales.

Much of Greig-Smith's published work was devoted to advancing the theory and methods of plant pattern, using his nested-quadrat approach as a basic tool. His fundamental idea that the perceived properties of ecological phenomena are scale-dependent set the foundations for the development of a theory of scaling in ecology, a central concept in modern climate change and global sustainability studies.

==== Dunes as model ecosystems ====
One of Greig-Smith’s early research papers, Gemmell, et al. (1953), dealt with the formation of tussocks in Ammophila arenaria and included detailed observations on the clumped distribution of tillers, which form tussock-like clumps in older, fixed dunes but are regularly distributed in the younger, moving dunes. After this initial study, the spatial pattern of dunes and grasslands became a lifelong interest in his ecological research, published in a number of papers with collaborators and students. One of Greig-Smith's students, Andrew Morton, continued Greig-Smith's pattern analysis studies in the dunes at Newborough Warren in Anglesey, Wales, near Bangor.

==== Pattern in tropical ecosystems ====
Below only the study of coastal dunes, Greig-Smith's interests were strongly focused on tropical ecosystems. After his visit to Trinidad as a young researcher, he developed an interest for African savannas, on the possibility of using his methodology for pattern analysis to understand the importance of intraspecific competition in tropical, strongly rainfall-seasonal ecosystems.

==== Toward a theory of scaling ====
In different papers, he showed the importance of scaling in the measurement of plant spatial pattern. He understood that researchers sampling the same vegetation with quadrats of different size could reach diametrically opposed conclusions: a researcher using small quadrats would find that his quadrats harbor either clumps or no plants at all, and would conclude that the species pattern in space follows a clumped distribution. Similarly, a researcher using large quadrats would find a similar number of clumps in each quadrat and would conclude that the species distribution is markedly regular. In reality, both would be right because a species can have a strongly clumped distribution at a certain scale and a regular distribution at another. As president of the British Ecological Society, he wrote an address in 1979, in which he summarized his ideas on the importance of scaling in ecological spatial pattern. Some of his students took his ideas and pursued them further: Mark Hill developed a rigorous mathematical theory for the analysis of pattern at a community level, while Kenneth A. Kershaw, after publishing in co-authorship with Greig-Smith, continued exploring for years the drivers of pattern at different scales.

==== Scaling in modern ecology ====
The fundamental concept that ecological phenomena could have different behaviors when measured at different scales became really important for understanding large-scale phenomena in the biosphere. The Theory of Scaling became a mainstream concept in ecological research in the late 1980s and 1990s, with the publication of two now-classic papers: Wiens (1989) and Simon Levin (1992).

=== Multivariate methods: classification and ordination in ecology ===
Greig-Smith was among the first ecologists to understand that multivariate methods were destined to become important tools in quantitative plant ecology. His inclusion of multivariate classification and ordination in his book opened the door for the explosion of analytical approaches and methodological discussions that surged in the 1970s and 1980s. As with pattern analysis, Greig-Smith was ahead of his time: although the potential of multivariate methods—based on matrix algebra—was already recognized in the 1950s, mostly as a result of a growing need for more-rigorous methods in ecology, performing an analysis of a modestly sized floristic matrix of, say, fifty sites and one hundred species was a complicated and enormously time-consuming task. The generalized access to electronic computers, which began in the 1960s, opened the doors for the widespread use of these methods; Bangor’s first computer became available in 1964. Greig-Smith saw in multivariate methods an opportunity to analyze and understand the complex floristic composition of tropical forests, which had fascinated him since his visit to Trinidad in 1948.

In 1963, he applied for a grant to investigate the use of quantitative methods to establish whether the highly diverse tropical rainforests showed any organized pattern, particularly in relation to environment, an open question at the time. With these funds, in 1964 he appointed Michael Austin as a postdoctoral research assistant to the project. Three seminal papers were published as a result of their collaboration, highlighting the potential of multivariate methods to analyze floristic patterns in complex, multispecies communities.

==== Multivariate methods as hypothesis-generating procedures ====
Having laid the foundations of the discipline of multivariate methods, as a committed naturalist and field biologist Greig-Smith never took much interest in abstruse theoretical discussions, always expressing his concern about the risk of becoming too engaged with theoretical refinements of methodology and repeatedly stating his belief that numerical methods are worth developing only if they are to be used on real data in attempts to answer real questions with relevance in the field. The ultimate evidence, for him, was not in the computer output but in the field. In a synthesis paper published in 1980, he insisted that multivariate methods are simply hypothesis-generating procedures, and counseled students to do experimental tests addressing the insights from the classification and ordination analyses rather than taking the results of their analyses as an unchallengeable truth.

==== Novel approaches to multivariate analysis ====
Greig-Smith's later papers on multivariate methods, with Mike Swaine and Carlos Montaña, were devoted to exploring new and innovative applications for multivariate analysis, including the analysis of time-series data and the exploration of the niche preference of species within a community.

=== Quantitative Plant Ecology (book) ===
Greig-Smith’s most influential work was his book Quantitative Plant Ecology, used by generations of students and young researchers around the world. The book, first published in 1957, enjoyed two subsequent editions in 1964 and 1982.

The success of Greig-Smith’s book triggered the publication of many other similar books, many of them by former Greig-Smith collaborators (such as Kershaw 1964 and Orlóci 1975), and nurtured an explosion of concepts and ideas around the quantitative treatment of ecological data, many of which arose in Canada (such as Pielou 1969) and Australia (such as Williams 1976).

=== Holism and reductionism in ecology ===
In the 1950s and 1960s, at the time when the School of Plant Biology at Bangor consolidated as a global magnet for plant ecologists, an active scientific debate, excellently synthesized in Barbour (1996), was taking place worldwide on the role of holism and reductionism as the main tools to understand ecological phenomena. In Britain, this debate centered mostly on the use of descriptive methods or the quest to understand patterns in nature, as opposed to the use of experimental methods or the search for ecological processes. In Bangor, in particular, the most vocal proponent of an experimental and reductionist approach to ecological research was John L. Harper, who often criticized quantitative vegetation scientists on their descriptive, rather than experimental, approach to research. Roy Turkington recalls that Harper strongly favored the power of simple, direct experiments and distrusted complex multivariate methods, often arguing that ordination methods were “a formalized description of consequences.” “Nowhere is this holism more apparent than in the way ecology is taught in many schools and universities with its emphasis on complex systems and the ways in which they can be described,” wrote Harper in “After Description”, and he immediately added: “There is probably no other science in which students are taught by being dropped into the deep end of complexity.” The contrast between experimental ecology in simplified systems, with only one or a few species, against large-scale pattern-seeking methods led Peter Greig-Smith and John Harper into frequent discussions in the form of good-humored debates following departmental seminars in Bangor, which, as amusingly evoked in Hill (2003) and Matlack (2009), were conducted amid legendary clouds of pipe smoke for the benefit of the students, who could see firsthand how academic arguments conducted both with rigor and humor can be very stimulating and deeply entertaining.

Greig-Smith, however, was not really a holist. From his very first papers on the tropical forests of Trinidad, he embraced Henry Gleason’s “individualistic” model of plant communities. Tim Allen, a Greig-Smith student in the 1960s, recalls that while in the 1980s “the use of descriptive multivariate methods degenerated into a ritual that community ecologists were expected to perform”, Greig-Smith insisted that ecological research should always have experimental tests addressing the insights gained and the hypotheses derived from the quantitative analysis, as in Morton (1974). Perhaps the main difference with Harper’s single-species experimental approach lied in Greig-Smith’s interest in complex, multispecies systems, and his opinion that projects should start with observations and the search for patterns, before establishing hypotheses about the processes that drive ecosystem functions and experimenting to tests these hypotheses. The debates between Harper and Greig-Smith at Bangor had a large influence on the development of ecological theory in the last four decades of the 20th century.

=== Greig-Smith's intellectual progeny ===
In Bangor, Greig-Smith took the view that it was up to his students and young postdocs to define the project, develop the scientific hypotheses, and do the work, provided that they included quantitative ecology, his own area of expertise, in their graduate research. He rarely put his own name on his students’ research papers, so that his enormous influence is visible often only in the acknowledgements of published papers. However, some of the papers written by students and researchers while at Greig-Smith’s lab rank among the highest cited in ecology, and owe much of their originality to Greig-Smith’s mentorship.

== Legacy ==
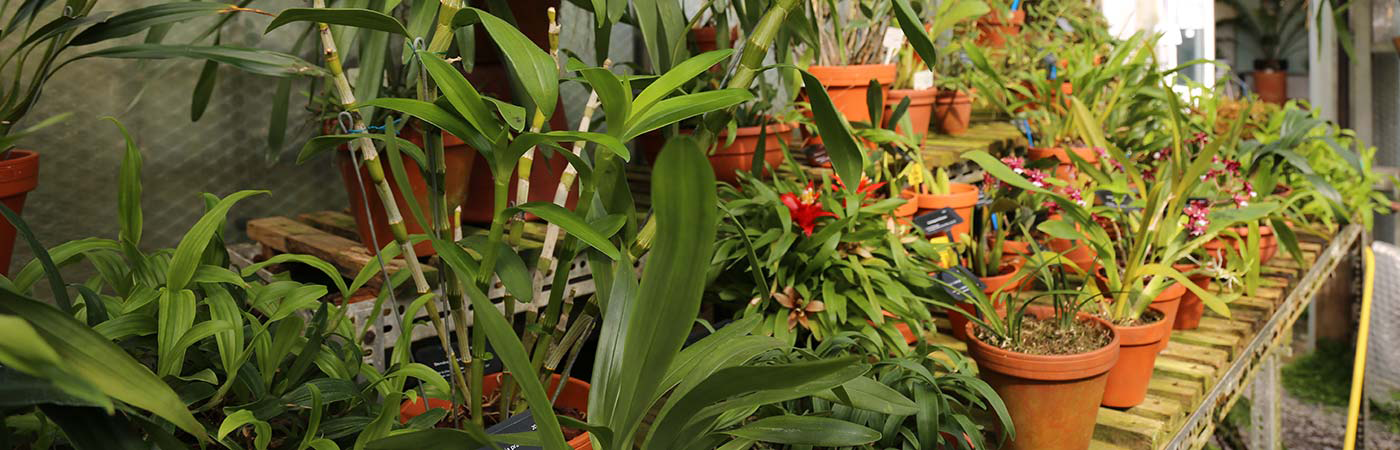
The "Peter Greig-Smith" Orchid Collection at Treborth Botanical Gardens, Bangor, Wales.

Greig-Smith maintained a lifelong interest in tropical ecology. He was a friend and follower of Paul W. Richards, CBE, a professor at Bangor and one of Britain's most outstanding tropical ecologists. In his obituary of Richards, Greig-Smith recalled the establishment by Richards of the MSc course in ecology at Bangor as a program fundamentally directed to meet the needs of students from the tropics.

After Trinidad, he visited Nigeria in 1966, where he established a long-lasting relationship with the University of Ife as an external examiner. His passion for tropical ecosystems was palpable in the time and effort he devoted to maintain and curate his orchid collection, donated after his death to the Treborth Botanical Gardens at Bangor, as described in Retallick (2011)

In the 1960s and 1970s he served the British Ecological Society as its secretary (1961–1963), as editor of the Journal of Ecology (1964–1968), and as president (1978–1979), with John Maynard-Smith as his vice president. In his presidential viewpoint address in the Bulletin of the British Ecological Society, he advised younger ecologists not to become too specialized: “Insight so often comes from initially unconsidered information and ideas,” he wrote, urging colleagues to maintain a broad curiosity for the natural world
