= Roy Taylor =

Roy Taylor may refer to:

- Roy Taylor (cricketer) (born 1944), South African cricketer
- Roy Taylor (cyclist) (1916–1987), New Zealand cyclist
- Roy Taylor (ecologist) (1924–2007), British ecologist
- Roy Taylor (footballer) (1891–1969), Australian footballer
- Bert Taylor (footballer, born 1900) (1900–1980), known as Roy Taylor, Australian rules footballer
- Roy Taylor (historian), winner of the Julian Corbett Prize in Naval History 1954
- Roy Taylor (diabetologist), physician and diabetologist at Newcastle University, United Kingdom
- Roy Taylor (tennis) (1883–1934), Australian tennis and lacrosse player
- Roy A. Taylor (1910–1995), American politician
- Roy Charles Taylor (1889–1963), Canadian politician, elected in Alberta general election, 1935
- J. Roy Taylor (born 1949), professor of physics at Imperial College London
