= Hannah Buckley =

New Zealand ecologist

Academic background
- Education: Victoria University of Wellington, University of Alberta
- Thesis: Structure of vascular plant, epiphytic lichen, ground beetle (Carabidae), and diatom (Bacillariophyceae) communities in south-central Alberta, Canada (2001)

Hannah Buckley is a New Zealand ecologist, professor, and Head of School of Science at Auckland University of Technology, specialising in biological variation in community ecological diversity through time and space.

== Academic career ==
Buckley completed a Bachelor of Science with Honours at Victoria University of Wellington and then a PhD titled Structure of vascular plant, epiphytic lichen, ground beetle (Carabidae), and diatom (Bacillariophyceae) communities in south-central Alberta, Canada at the University of Alberta. Buckley completed postdoctoral work at Florida State University, where she worked on ecological variation in communities inside pitcher plants across North America. Buckley then joined the faculty of Lincoln University, where she rose to associate professor. During this time she was awarded a Bullard Fellowship at Harvard University, where she and her husband Brad Case researched spatial patterns in co-occurrence of species in forest plots with Aaron Ellison.

Buckley then moved to the Auckland University of Technology, becoming Head of School of Science in March 2020, and Professor of Ecology in 2022. She is a lead investigator in the Biological Heritage National Science Challenge.

Buckley is an ecologist, who investigate biological variation over time and space. She also studies gender in science, finding that editor's selection of reviewers for papers submitted to the New Zealand Journal of Ecology showed a gender bias: "Although the effect of associate editor gender on the selection rate of female versus male reviewers was not strong, there was nonetheless a trend for female editors to select more female reviewers than did male editors, suggesting that editors could probably improve female selection rates on the whole."

== Selected works ==
- Syrie M. Hermans; Buckley, Hannah L.; Case, Bradley; Fiona Curran-Cournane; Matthew Taylor; Lear, Gavin (2016). "Bacteria as Emerging Indicators of Soil Condition". Applied and Environmental Microbiology. 83 (1). doi:10.1128/aem.02826-16. PMC 5165110. PMID 27793827. Wikidata Q38802443.
- Thomas E Miller; Jean H Burns; Munguia, Pablo; Walters, Eric; Kneitel, Jamie; Paul M Richards; Nicolas Mouquet; Buckley, Hannah L. (2005). "A critical review of twenty years' use of the resource-ratio theory". The American Naturalist. 165 (4): 439–448. doi:10.1086/428681. PMID 15791536. Wikidata Q34406509.
- Thomas E. Miller; Elise S. Gornish; Buckley, Hannah L. (2009). "Climate and coastal dune vegetation: disturbance, recovery, and succession". Plant Ecology. 206 (1): 97–104. doi:10.1007/s11258-009-9626-z. Wikidata Q123765637.
- Jonsson, Mattias; Buckley, Hannah L.; Case, Bradley; Steve D. Wratten; Roddy J. Hale; Didham, Raphael Krishna (2012). "Agricultural intensification drives landscape‐context effects on host–parasitoid interactions in agroecosystems". Journal of Applied Ecology. 49 (3): 706–714. doi:10.1111/j.1365-2664.2012.02130.x. Wikidata Q123765632.
- Lear, Gavin; Dickie, Ian A.; Banks, Jonathan; et al. (2018), Methods for the extraction, storage, amplification and sequencing of DNA from environmental samples, doi:10.20417/nzjecol.42.9, Wikidata Q56827236
- Syrie M Hermans; Buckley, Hannah L.; Case, Bradley; Fiona Curran-Cournane; Matthew Taylor; Lear, Gavin (2020). "Using soil bacterial communities to predict physico-chemical variables and soil quality". Microbiome. 8 (1): 79. doi:10.1186/s40168-020-00858-1. PMC 7268603. PMID 32487269. Wikidata Q96123138.
- Buckley, Hannah L.; Thomas E. Miller; Ellison, Aaron; Gotelli, Nicholas James (2003). "Reverse latitudinal trends in species richness of pitcher-plant food webs". Ecology Letters. 6 (9): 825–829. doi:10.1046/j.1461-0248.2003.00504.x. Wikidata Q58042479.
