= Methods in Ecology and Evolution =

- Discipline: Ecology, evolution
- Language: English
- Edited by: Aaron M. Ellison

Publication details
- History: 2010–present
- Publisher: Wiley-Blackwell on behalf of the British Ecological Society (United Kingdom)
- Frequency: Monthly
- Open access: Yes
- Impact factor: 6.6 (2022)

Standard abbreviations
- ISO 4: Methods Ecol. Evol.

Indexing
- ISSN: 2041-210X
- OCLC no.: 643796707

Links
- Journal homepage; Online access; Online archive

Methods in Ecology and Evolution is a monthly peer-reviewed scientific journal covering methodologies in ecology and evolution. It was established in 2010 and is the 5th journal of the British Ecological Society. It is published by Wiley-Blackwell on behalf of the British Ecological Society and the editors-in-chief are Aaron M. Ellison (Harvard University), Natalie Cooper (Natural History Museum), Nicolas Lecomte (Université de Moncton), and Huijie Qiao (Chinese Academy of Sciences). In June 2022 it was announced that the journal would switch to a full open access publishing model from January 2023, with all papers submitted to the journal from 6 July 2022 open access on publication.

== Abstracting and indexing ==
According to the Journal Citation Reports, the journal has a 2022 impact factor of 6.6 .

== See also ==
- Journal of Ecology
- Journal of Animal Ecology
- Journal of Applied Ecology
- Functional Ecology
