= Peter J. Grubb =

British ecologist and botanist

Peter John Grubb (born 9 August 1935 in Ilford, London) is a British ecologist and emeritus professor of botany at Cambridge University.

== Early life ==
Grubb was born on 9 August 1935 to Harold Amos Grubb and Phyllis Gertrude née Hook. He attended Royal Liberty School and then Magdalene College, Cambridge where he received his BA in 1957, his PhD in 1962, and his ScD in 1995. His Ph.D. was supervised by G. E. Briggs.

In 1965, he married Elizabeth Adelaide Anne and they have one son and one daughter.

== Career ==
He joined the staff of Magdalene College, later becoming a full professor (retired in 2001). His early work was mentored by E. J. H. Corner and A. S. Watt, and especially influenced by the latter. He has written an informal account of his becoming a plant ecologist.

Grubb worked on diverse botanical and ecological subjects, from physiology to biomes and from chalk grassland to tropical rain forest. His name is particularly associated with the concept of regeneration niche.

Grubb was president of the British Ecological Society in 1992 and is now honorary member of the society. He co-edited the Journal of Ecology 1972–1977.
