= Journal of Applied Ecology =

- Discipline: Environmental management
- Language: English
- Edited by: Jos Barlow, Nathalie Pettorelli, Philip Stephens, Martin Nuñez, Romina Rader

Publication details
- History: 1964–present
- Publisher: Wiley-Blackwell on behalf of the British Ecological Society (United Kingdom)
- Frequency: Monthly
- Impact factor: 6.53 (2020)

Standard abbreviations
- ISO 4: J. Appl. Ecol.

Indexing
- CODEN: JAPEAI
- ISSN: 0021-8901 (print); 1365-2664 (web)
- LCCN: 64009478
- OCLC no.: 525578170

Links
- Journal homepage; Online access; Online archive; Journal page at publisher's website

Journal of Applied Ecology is a monthly peer-reviewed scientific journal publishing research in all areas of environmental management. It was established in 1964 and is published by Wiley on behalf of the British Ecological Society. The Senior Editors are Jos Barlow (Executive Editor), Nathalie Pettorelli, Philip Stephens, Martin A. Nuñez and Romina Rader.

== Types of papers published ==
The journal publishes the following types of papers:

- Research Articles
- Reviews
- Commentaries
- Forums - short contributions intended to stimulate debate
- Policy Directions - discussing policy
- Practitioner's Perspectives - application of research results to environmental management

== Southwood Prize ==
The British Ecological Society awards an annual prize to the best paper from the previous year by an early career researcher in each of the Society's journals. Journal of Applied Ecology awards the Southwood Prize.

== See also ==
- Journal of Ecology
- Journal of Animal Ecology
- Functional Ecology
- Methods in Ecology and Evolution
