= Journal of Animal Ecology =

- Discipline: Animal ecology
- Language: English
- Edited by: Nate Sanders

Publication details
- History: 1932–present
- Publisher: Wiley-Blackwell on behalf of the British Ecological Society (United Kingdom)
- Frequency: Monthly
- Impact factor: 5.600 (2021)

Standard abbreviations
- ISO 4: J. Anim. Ecol.

Indexing
- CODEN: JAECAP
- ISSN: 0021-8790 (print); 1365-2656 (web)
- LCCN: agr35000273
- OCLC no.: 42799265

Links
- Journal homepage; Online access; Online archive

The Journal of Animal Ecology is a monthly peer-reviewed scientific journal publishing research in all areas of animal ecology. It began publication in 1932, and as such is the second oldest journal of the British Ecological Society (after Journal of Ecology). Its first Editor was Charles Elton, with A. D. Middleton as Assistant Editor. It is currently edited by Nate Sanders (University of Michigan), Lesley Lancaster (University of Aberdeen), Darren Evans (Newcastle University) and Ana M. C. Santos (Universidad Autónoma de Madrid)

== Types of papers published ==
The journal publishes the following types of papers:

- Research Articles – a typical experimental, comparative or theoretical paper
- Concepts – short essays on emerging ideas and research areas or novel perspectives on classic concepts
- Reviews – syntheses of topics of broad ecological interest
- Research Methods Guides – instructional papers that aim to serve as a practical guide for animal ecologists in using a specific experimental or theoretical model or system, or software package
- Long-term Studies in Animal Ecology – balanced, comprehensive and concise syntheses of well-established field or laboratory study systems whilst providing future research directions and/or paradigm shifts
- Forum articles – short contributions intended to stimulate debate
- Research Highlights – short articles designed to highlight high-interest material

== Abstracting and indexing ==
The journal is abstracted and indexed in Cambridge Scientific Abstracts, Elsevier Biobase/Current Awareness in Biological Sciences, Current Contents, GEOBASE, and the Science Citation Index Expanded. According to the Journal Citation Reports, the journal has a 2021 impact factor of 5.600.

== See also ==
- Journal of Ecology
- Journal of Applied Ecology
- Functional Ecology
- Methods in Ecology and Evolution
