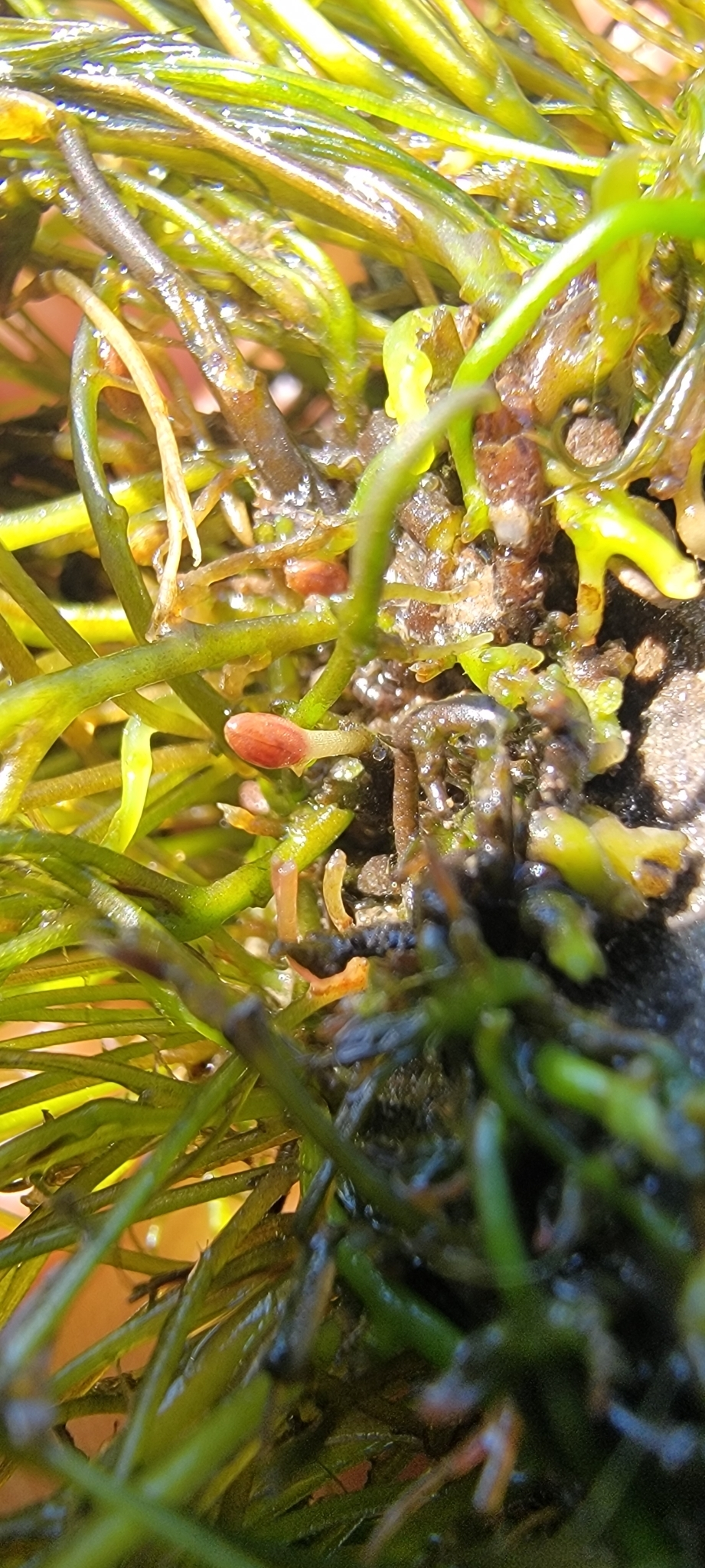
- In Quebec

Conservation status
- Least Concern (IUCN 3.1)

Scientific classification
- Kingdom: Plantae
- Clade: Tracheophytes
- Clade: Angiosperms
- Clade: Eudicots
- Clade: Rosids
- Order: Malpighiales
- Family: Podostemaceae
- Genus: Podostemum
- Species: P. ceratophyllum

Binomial name
- Podostemum ceratophyllum Michaux

= Podostemum ceratophyllum =

Species of aquatic plant

Podostemum ceratophyllum, commonly known as the hornleaf riverweed, is a species of submerged aquatic plant in the family Podostemaceae. It is native to eastern North America where it grows on hard bottoms in swiftly flowing rivers and streams and is considered a foundation species.

== Description ==
The roots are green, fleshy and flattened, spreading finger-like over the surface of the rock to provide anchorage. The stems are closely packed together, being 1 to 9 mm (0.04 to 0.35 in) apart. The leaves have basal sheaths and boat-shaped leaf bases which extend into stipules. The petioles are slender and the leaf blades linear. The inflorescences are lateral, each individual flower being bilaterally symmetric. Each flower has two scale-like tepals that are shorter than the ovary, and a further tepal on top of the andropodium, between the two stamens. The ovary is set on a pedicel and orientated obliquely. The fruit is a two-chambered capsule. The actual form of the plant is rather variable, probably influenced by its environment; in one form the leaves are up to 20 cm (8 in) long, while in another they are stubby and clustered at the end of the stems. The stems vary as well, sometimes being hardened and blackish, contrasting with the bright green growth of the foliage in spring and summer. The leaves may become reddened or senescent in the winter.

== Distribution and habitat ==
Podostemum ceratophyllum is found in eastern North America. Its range extends from Ontario and Quebec southwards to Ohio, Kentucky, Tennessee, Louisiana, Mississippi, Alabama and Georgia. It also occurs in the Dominican Republic and in Honduras. It grows in fast flowing rivers and streams on rocky substrates at altitudes up to about 800 m (2,600 ft). It is a foundation species in mid-sized montane and piedmont rivers.

== Ecology ==
Hornleaf riverweed flowers in the summer when water levels drop and the plants become exposed to the air. After pollination, which is probably performed by wind or insects, the capsules take two or three weeks to mature. The seeds are small and sticky; they may adhere to hard substrates under water or may be carried elsewhere, stuck to the legs of birds. The plants grow fast and vigorously and provide habitat for many aquatic insects and their larvae, as well as Cnidaria, Turbellaria, Mollusca, Annelida, Hydrachnidia, Cladocera and Copepoda. Small fish feed on the invertebrates and freshwater snails graze on the foliage. It is also sometimes consumed by turtles, beavers and white-tailed deer.

This plant affects its environment by altering water-flow and by encouraging the deposition of sediment. It also contributes to the detritus present, although the leaves decompose rapidly after being shed. It can be considered a foundation species, removing nutrients from the water, accumulating biomass, supplying food in the food chain and providing habitat. The plant is in decline in much of its range, but precisely why is unclear; changes in sedimentation or water quality may be involved, as may changes in water temperature and overgrowth by epiphytes. Whatever the reason for the decline, a decrease in hornleaf riverweed is likely to have considerable effects on the ecosystem.
