= Exequiel Ezcurra =

Argentine-Mexican plant ecologist and conservationist

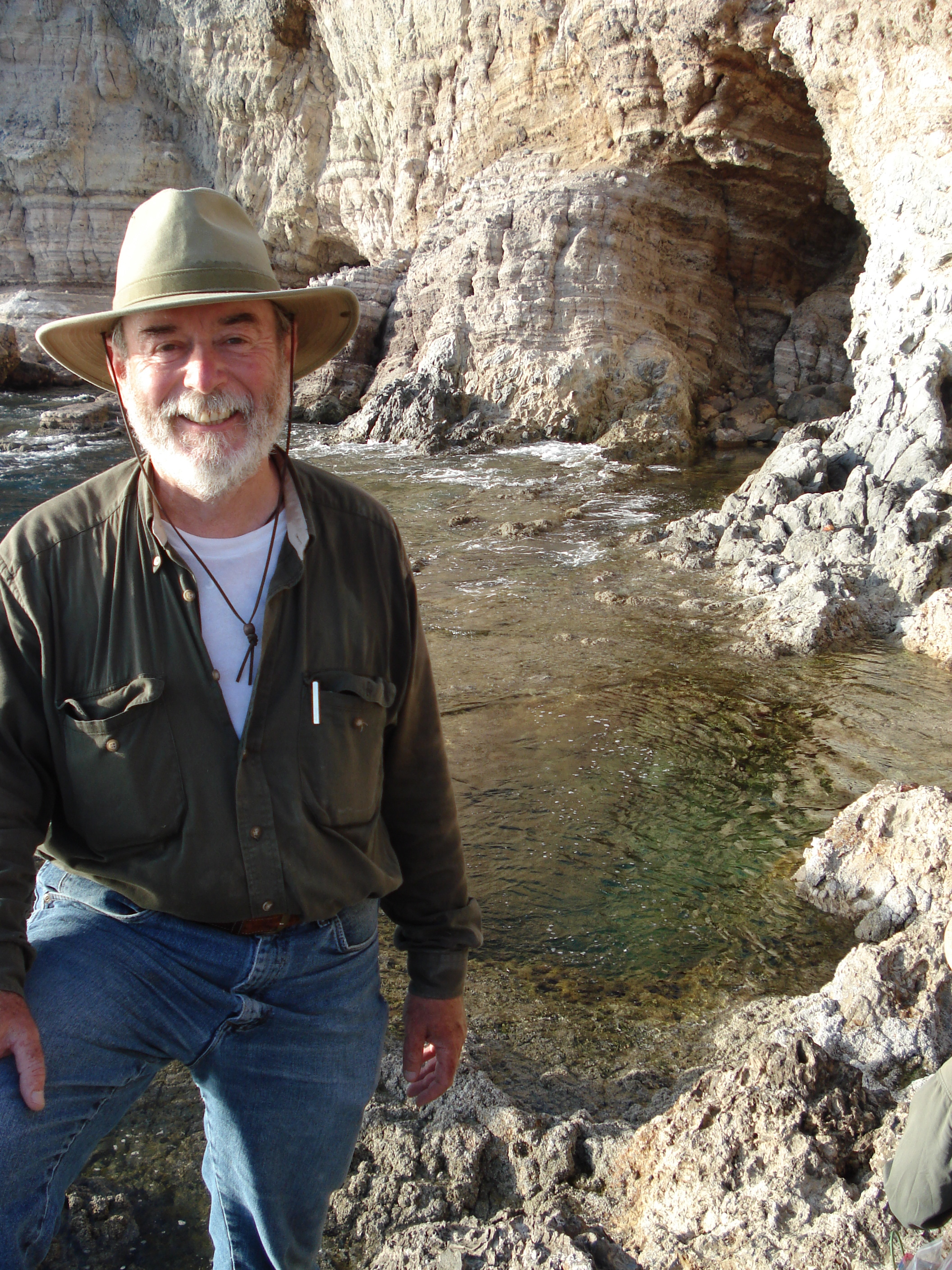
- Dr. Exequiel Ezcurra on Isla San Pedro Mártir
- Born: March 21, 1950 (age 76); Buenos Aires, Argentina
- Occupations: Ecologist & Conservationist

Exequiel Ezcurra (born March 21, 1950, Buenos Aires, Argentina) is an Argentine-Mexican plant ecologist and conservationist. His highly interdisciplinary work spans desert plant ecology, mangroves, island biogeography, sea birds, fisheries, oceanography, and deep-sea ecosystems.

Between 2008 and 2019 he was director of the University of California Institute for Mexico and the United States. He is now a professor of plant ecology at UC Riverside.

== Education ==
Ezcurra received his B.S. from the University of Buenos Aires in 1973. He then received an M.Sc. and a Ph.D. in plant biology from the University College of North Wales in 1978 and 1984, respectively. At Bangor, his primary mentor was Peter Greig-Smith, a renowned ecologist whose academic lineage of mentors can be traced back to Charles Darwin.

== Career ==
Ezcurra was the principal researcher in charge of the Laboratory of Community Ecology at National Autonomous University of Mexico (UNAM) from 1987 to 1998. In 1998, Ezcurra moved to San Diego, California to take on the roles of director of the Biodiversity Research Center of the Californias, and deputy director of research and collections at the San Diego Natural History Museum. In December 2000, Ezcurra was appointed president of Mexico's National Institute of Ecology and Climate Change (Instituto Nacional de Ecología y Cambio Climático), and independent research branch of Mexico's Ministry of the Environment and Natural Resources (Secretaría de Medio Ambiente y Recursos Naturales) from 2000 to 2005.

Ezcurra returned as head of research to the San Diego Natural History Museum, where he remained until 2008, when he assumed his current role as professor of plant ecology at UC Riverside, as well as director of UC MEXUS. Ezcurra has also served as president of the board of the Mexican National Commission of Protected Natural Areas (CONANP), and Scientific Chair for the CITES Convention.

As an active member of the Mexican National System of Researchers (Sistema Nacional de Investigadores), Ezcurra also lectures and is a graduate adviser at a number of Mexican universities and research centers, as well as the Scripps Institution of Oceanography.

Other achievements from Dr. Ezcurra's 40-year research career, include developing the first environmental impact assessments in Mexico, playing a central part in the establishment of multiple natural protected areas (including the El Pinacate y Gran Desierto de Altar Biosphere Reserve and the Islands of the Gulf of California). Dr. Ezcurra also played a key role in promoting the creation of the California condor release program in Baja California, and initiating the successful restoration of Guadalupe Island in the Mexican Pacific.

=== Research ===
Ezcurra has published more than 170 research papers, books, and book chapters. These include three books about the Gulf of California and its surrounding islands, and a large number of essays and articles for newspapers and popular journals. Ezcurra's areas of research include conservation science, the ecology and biogeography of coastal deserts, land-ocean interactions and their impact on both marine and terrestrial environments, the application of mathematical modeling in ecology and conservation, and the management of natural resources in areas under traditional use. In his career as a plant ecologist, Dr. Ezcurra has worked to describe the relationships between marine and terrestrial ecological systems, and the processes that drive highly productive environments. His academic works include a range of highly cited papers covering desert plant ecology, mangroves, island biogeography, sea birds, fisheries, oceanography, and deep sea ecosystems.

One of the principal strengths and contributions of Ezcurra's ecological research is the ability to document the individual components of an ecosystem and then synthesize these components at a regional landscape level. Examples of this approach include:

=== Conservation ===
Dr. Ezcurra is known for translating scientific research into tangible, positive conservation outcomes. His work has influenced policy at the highest levels of government. It has also created strong and lasting collaborations between the governments of Mexico and the United States, as well as between academic institutions and non-governmental organizations from both countries. Specific instances include:

- The first Environmental Impact Assessments for impacts to mangrove forests on Mexico's Yucatán Peninsula
- The establishment of El Pinacate and Gran Desierto de Altar Biosphere Reserve in 1993 and its subsequent classification as a UNESCO World Heritage Site in 2013,
- The establishment of the Islands and Protected Areas of the Gulf of California UNESCO World Heritage Site in 2005.
- The establishment of Cabo Pulmo Natural Protected area, in Baja California Sur, Mexico, in 1995.

=== Science popularization ===
From the outset of his career, Ezcurra has pursued the dissemination of science to the general public through his writing, museum work, and other creative media. Some notable examples include his roles as the:

- Science script writer, producer, and narrator of the award-winning giant-screen film "Ocean Oasis" (1999)
- San Diego Natural History Museum exhibit curator of "Desert and Sea – Evolutionary Processes and Biodiversity of the Pacific Coastal Deserts of North America" (1999) and "Water: The California Story" (2008)
- American Museum of Natural History international exhibit curator of "Water: H2O = Life" (2007)
- Story-script writer and narrator of "The Natural Numbers, Sardines” infographic video, as well as other Natural Number videos including “Gold”, “Free-flowing Rivers”, “Mangroves”, “Spawning aggregations”, and “Marine Ecotourism”.

== Honors and awards ==
- 1993, Faustino Miranda Medal from UNAM for merit in ecological research
- 1993, Conservación Award from Pronatura
- 1994, Julian Hayden Award from the Sonoran Alliance
- 1994, Society for Conservation Biology Award
- 2001, Wildscreen Award for the film “Ocean Oasis”
- 2001, Jackson Hole Wildlife Film Festival for the film “Ocean Oasis”
- 2005–2008, Pew Fellowship in the field of Marine Conservation
- 2017, Fellow of the Ecological Society of America
- 2018, Corresponding member of the Mexican Academy of Sciences
- 2019, Academic Chair in Environmental Research, Miguel Alemán Foundation, Mexico.
- 2020, Science Diplomacy Award, by the American Association for the Advancement of Science
