= Richard Henry Yapp =

English botanist (1871–1929)

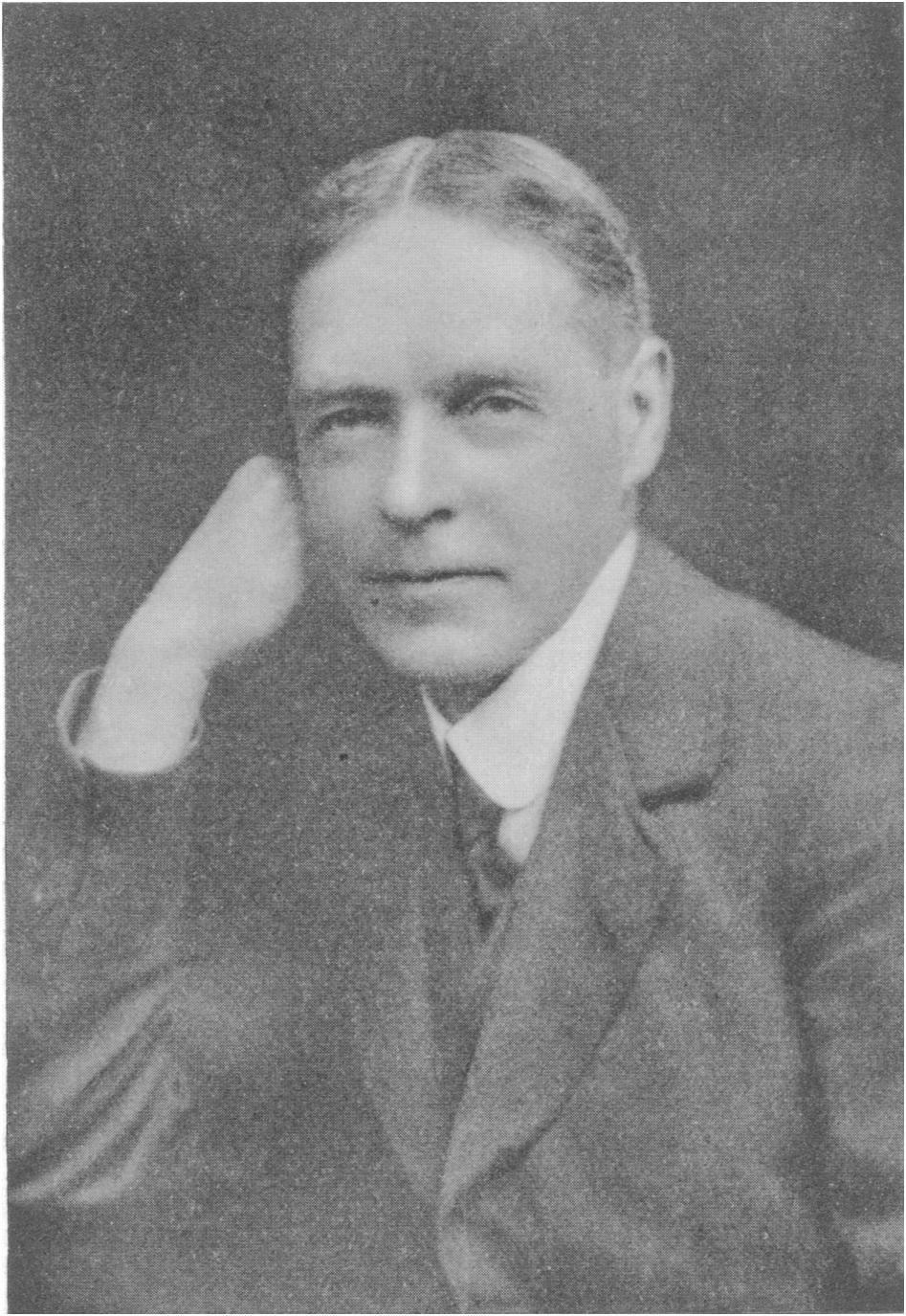
- Born: 8 October 1871
- Died: 22 January 1929 (aged 57)
- Alma mater: St John's College; Gonville and Caius College
- Occupation: Botanist, academic, scientific collector
- Employer: Aberystwyth University (1904–1914); Queen's University Belfast (1914–); University of Birmingham (1919–1929); University of Cambridge

Richard Henry Yapp (8 October 1871 – 22 January 1929) was an English botanist and an early ecologist, who held the Chair of Botany in Queen's University, Belfast, and the Mason Professorship of Botany at the University of Birmingham.

== Early life and education ==
Yapp was born on 8 October 1871 at Orleton, Herefordshire, England, the son of Jane (née Gammidge) and Richard Keysall Yapp, a landowner and farmer. After attending a private school at Leominster he was educated at Hereford's County School, (Note: Venn refers to this as "Hereford County College".) but his education ended when he was 15 due to the death of his father. Although working, his thirst for knowledge led him to attend a variety of classes, including some at University College, Nottingham, and in 1895 he was awarded a scholarship and entered St John's College, Cambridge. He studied botany under Harry Marshall Ward, Albert Seward and Frederick Blackman, graduating with First Class Honours. He was awarded the Frank Smart Studentship by Gonville and Caius College at the University of Cambridge, to which he transferred in June 1899. He was captain of the university's lacrosse team for the year 1898–1899.

== Career ==
Yapp was appointed botanist to Cambridge University's 1899–1900 expedition to the North-Eastern Malay States, led by Walter William Skeat. (Note: Yapp is wrongly named in the introduction, as "Robert Henry Yapp".) Specimens he collected on the expedition went to the Cambridge University Herbarium, with some in the National Collection at Kew. The expedition also resulted in his paper, "Two Malayan Myrmecophilous Ferns".

On his return to Cambridge, he was curator of the university's herbarium from 1900 to 1903, and took up the study of the local fens, publishing a paper on Wicken Fen. He was appointed Professor of Botany at Aberystwyth University in 1904, adding to the university's museum collection specimens he collected in South Africa in 1905. While in Wales he studied the ecology of the Dovey Estuary.

He served on the central committee of the Study and Survey of British Vegetation, later renamed the British Vegetation Committee. This group evolved, in 1913, into the British Ecological Society, the first such society in the world.

In 1914, he became Chair of Botany at Queen's University, Belfast. He was also assistant to Sir Arthur Yapp, his older brother, in the Ministry of Food during World War I.

Yapp was appointed as the University of Birmingham's Mason Professor of Botany in 1919, succeeding George Stephen West and overseeing the department's move from the city centre to the new campus at Edgbaston, with laboratories arranged to his design.

For the year 1920–1921, he was President of the British Ecological Society. His 1923 textbook, "Botany: A Junior Book For Schools" was published in eighteen editions, the latest in 2013. An adapted edition was also produced for Australian schools, in 1934.

== Illness and death ==
By the time the new laboratories at Edgbaston were opened, in October 1927, Yapp was showing signs of ill health, and was soon unable to attend conferences. Nonetheless, in 1928 he was appointed President of the Botanical Section of the British Association.

He died in Birmingham on 22 January 1929, aged 57. Obituaries, noting the unfinished work which he had planned, were published in The Times, Nature and the Journal of Ecology.

He was survived by his wife, Sofia Karolina (née Klintberg; 1886–1941) a Swedish woman whom he married in 1913, and a son and a daughter.
