= Roy Taylor (ecologist) =

British ecologist

Lionel Roy Taylor (14 December 1924 – 26 January 2007) was a British ecologist, president of the British Ecological Society 1984/85, and editor of the Journal of Animal Ecology.

== Biography ==
Following his education at Manchester Central High School, Taylor had a spell as clerk with the CWS in Manchester, followed by 5 years in the RAF as a wireless mechanic and later as an EVT (Educational Vocational Training) lecturer in maths and physics.

He arrived at Rothamsted Experimental Station, Harpenden, in 1948 as an assistant experimental officer in the entomology department to work with Dr C G Johnson on the black bean aphid. His early work on aphids with Johnson started a lifelong interest in the behaviour, ecology, migration and population dynamics of this group of worldwide agricultural pests. Soon he began working on the development of suction traps for sampling small flying insects, such as aphids. These were among of the first effective quantitative sampling devices for insect populations.

In 1961 Taylor published in the journal Nature a paper "Aggregation, variance and the mean", which proposed a relationship between the mean and variance of ecological samples and was to become known as "Taylor’s power law". This is one of the few general law-like relationships in ecology. In the following decades Taylor's law was observed in a variety of circumstances in areas such as ecology, epidemiology and genetics, ranging from the number of sexual partners reported by HIV infected individuals (Anderson et al., 1988) to the physical distribution of genes on human chromosome 7.

To provide sufficient population data to take his ideas forward he enlisted the help of amateur moth enthusiasts to run light traps throughout the UK. In 1964, he extended this work to aphids by setting up a national network of specially designed 40-foot (12.2m) high suction traps. Together the light and suction-trap networks became known as the Rothamsted Insect Survey. Data from the Insect Survey have been used by Taylor and colleagues for a wide range of studies including pest forecasting, spatio-temporal population dynamics, biodiversity and climate change studies. The Insect Survey continues to provide unique datasets which are in regular use by researchers. Today the Rothamsted insect survey monitors more than 800 insect species of aphids and moths. The results of the British trap network are published in a weekly 'Pest Advisory Bulletin'. The aphid early-warning system has been extended into Europe—from Scandinavia to Italy and as far east as Poland.

In the early 1970s Taylor started a collaboration with Rob Kempton on the measurement of species diversity. This collaboration provided an example of how statistical advice should be provided at Rothamsted and led directly to the system of assigning liaison statisticians to departments, which is still in operation today.

Taylor obtained a DSc from the University of London in 1966, became the recipient of the Royal Agricultural Society of England's gold research medal in 1977. He was elected a visiting professor at Queen Elizabeth College, London and was president of the British Ecological Society. In addition he was the honorary editor of the Journal of Animal Ecology between 1976 and 1989.

His interest in population dynamics also extended to humans and in 1969 he was the host and editor of a symposium held at the Royal Geographical Society on 'The Optimum Population for Britain' with an audience of mainly professional biologists. With the UK’s population then standing at 54 million, 90 per cent of participants thought the optimum population for Britain had already been exceeded.
