= Foundation species =

Species that structures an ecology

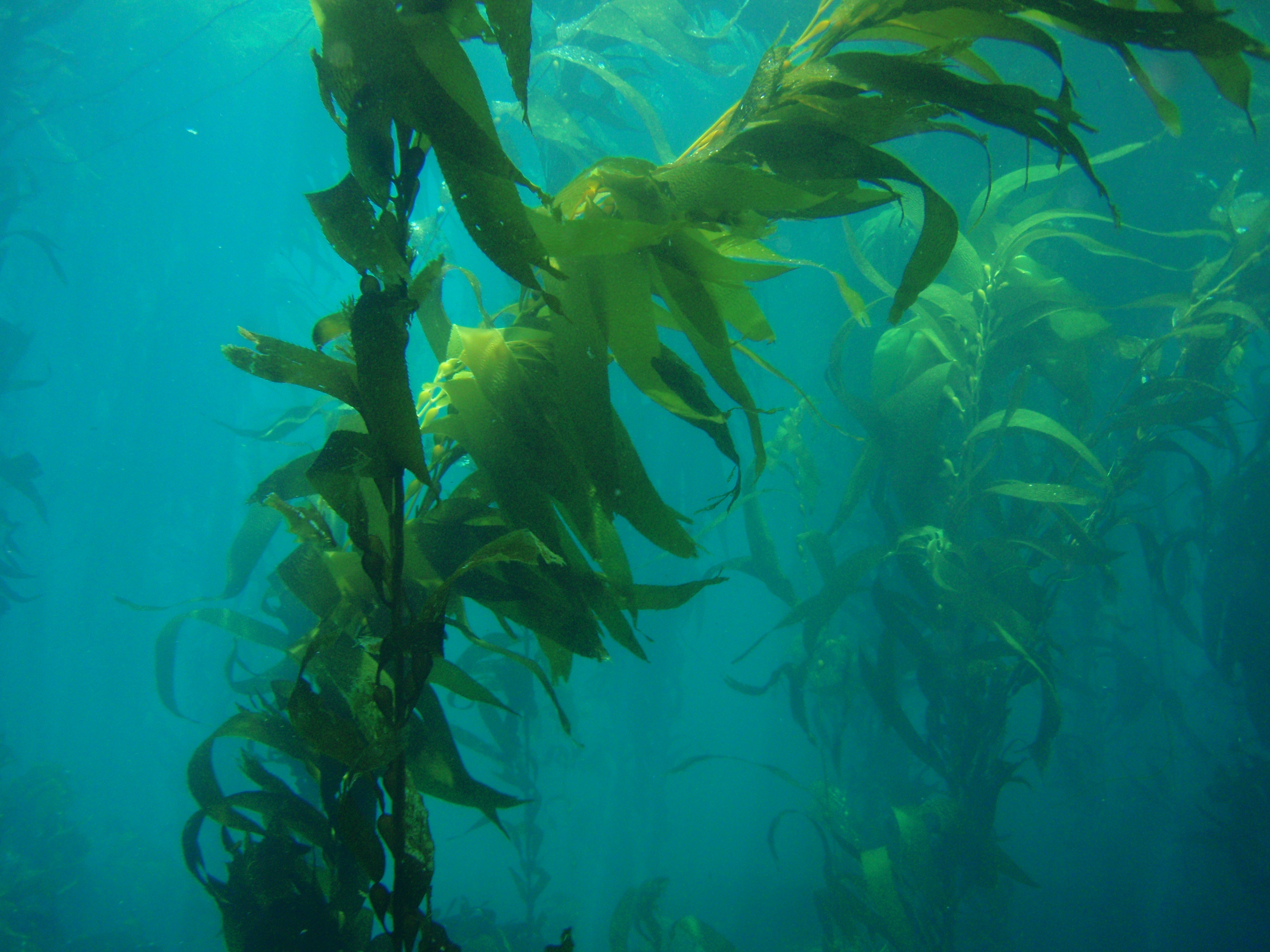
Californian forest of giant kelp, a foundation species

In ecology, the foundation species are species that have a strong role in structuring a community. A foundation species can occupy any trophic level in a food web (i.e., they can be primary producers, herbivores or predators). The term was coined by Paul K. Dayton in 1972, who applied it to certain members of marine invertebrate and algae communities. It was clear from studies in several locations that there were a small handful of species whose activities had a disproportionate effect on the rest of the marine community and they were therefore key to the resilience of the community. Dayton's view was that focusing on foundation species would allow for a simplified approach to more rapidly understand how a community as a whole would react to disturbances, such as pollution, instead of attempting the extremely difficult task of tracking the responses of all community members simultaneously. The term has since been applied to a range of organisms in ecosystems around the world, in both aquatic and terrestrial environments. Aaron Ellison et al. introduced the term to terrestrial ecology by applying the term foundation species to tree species that define and structure certain forest ecosystems through their influences on associated organisms and modulation of ecosystem processes.

== Examples and outcomes of foundation species loss ==
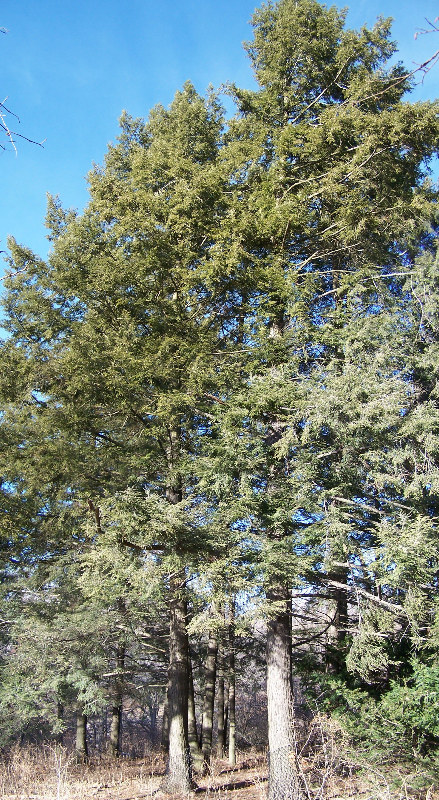
Tsuga canadensis

A study conducted at the McKenzie Flats of the Sevilleta National Wildlife Refuge in New Mexico, a semiarid biome transition zone, observed the result of loss of a variety of different dominant and codominant foundation species of plants on the growth of other species. This transition zone consists of two Chihuahuan Desert species, black grama (Bouteloua eriopoda) and creosote bush (Larrea tridentata), and a shortgrass steppe species, blue grama (Bouteloua gracillis). Each species dominates an area with a specific soil environment. Black grama dominates sandy soils, while blue grama dominates in soils with high clay content, and creosote bush dominates fine-textured soil with surface gravel. This study noted that responses to the loss of foundation species is dependent on a variety of different factors from the ability of a species to recover to the climate conditions of the ecosystem to the patterns in dominance and explored the possible reasons for the outcomes of the study. The results indicated that in areas with just one dominant foundation species, its loss caused a shift in dominance to a mixed dominant community. For example, the creosote bush dominated shrubland saw a shift in dominance to 32% by other shrubs, 26% by perennial grasses, and 22% by perennial forbs following the removal of creosote bush. Another finding was that regardless of the community type and the species removed, the loss of foundation species resulted in an overall increase in black grama supporting the notion that the outcome is greatly affected by recovery ability of species removed or loss.

Another study observed the effects of loss of foundation eastern hemlocks (Tsuga canadensis) in a forest ecosystem. Eastern hemlocks are a foundation species in eastern North American forests, but have been threatened by the accidental introduction of woolly adelgid. This study observed the effects that a loss in eastern hemlocks would have on the populations of arthropods, such as ants, beetles, and spiders, since these species are known indicators of environmental change. The results found that in areas of hemlock removal, there was an overall increase and influx of arthropod species. Researchers suggested that this was due to an increase in open habitats from the loss of the hemlocks. The results of this hemlock study corroborated with those from the previous McKenzie Flats study discussed in that the loss of foundation species led to a proliferation of species diversity in the affected area. These results seem to contradict a long-standing belief that foundation species play a vital role in communities and ecosystems by creating habitats for organisms, suggesting that in some circumstances they bottleneck species diversity.

Foundation species play a vital role in structuring a community; however, this can be in a variety of different ways. The presence of a foundation species has the ability to either reduce or increase species diversity depending on its particular role in a specific ecosystem. The studies discussed highlighted examples in which foundation species limited species diversity in similar and differing taxa (the McKenzie Flats and eastern hemlock studies, respectively).

== Effects ==
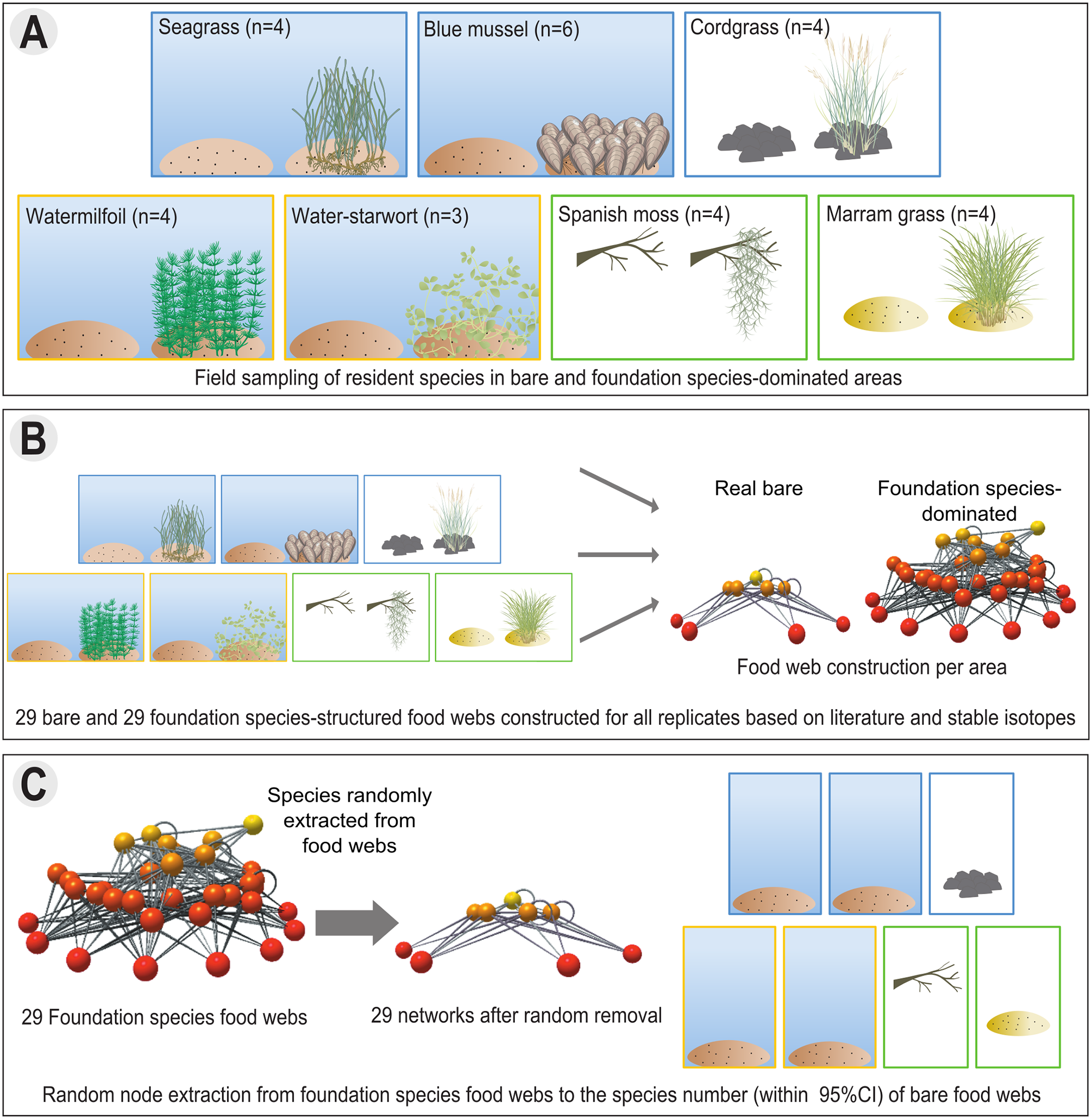
Foundation species enhance food web complexity In a 2018 study by Borst et al... (A) Seven ecosystems with foundation species were sampled: coastal (seagrass, blue mussel, cordgrass), freshwater (watermilfoil, water-starwort) and terrestrial (Spanish moss, marram grass). (B) Food webs were constructed for both bare and foundation species-dominated replicate areas. (C) From each foundation species structured-food web, nodes (species) were randomly removed until the species number matched the species number of the bare food webs. The presence of foundation species strongly enhances food web complexity, facilitating particularly species higher in the food chains.

A 2018 study by Borst et al.. tested the general hypothesis that foundation species – spatially dominant habitat-structuring organisms – modify food webs by enhancing their size as indicated by species number, and their complexity as indicated by link density, via facilitation of species, regardless of ecosystem type (see diagram). Additionally, they tested that any change in food web properties caused by foundation species occurs via random facilitation of species throughout the entire food web or via targeted facilitation of specific species that belong to certain trophic levels or functional groups. It was found that species at the base of the food web are less strongly, and carnivores are more strongly facilitated in foundation species' food webs than predicted based on random facilitation, resulting in a higher mean trophic level and a longer average chain length. This indicates foundation species strongly enhance food web complexity through non-trophic facilitation of species across the entire trophic network.

Foundation species strongly facilitate the associated community by creating new habitat and alleviating physical stress. This form of non-trophic facilitation by foundation species has been found to occur across a wide range of ecosystems and environmental conditions. In harsh coastal zones, corals, kelps, mussels, oysters, seagrasses, mangroves, and salt marsh plants facilitate organisms by attenuating currents and waves, providing aboveground structure for shelter and attachment, concentrating nutrients, and/or reducing desiccation stress during low tide exposure. In more benign systems, foundation species such as the trees in a forest, shrubs and grasses in savannahs, and macrophytes in freshwater systems, have also been found to play a major habitat-structuring role. Ultimately, all foundation species increase habitat complexity and availability, thereby partitioning and enhancing the niche space available to other species.

== See also ==
- Keystone species
- Indicator species
- Flagship species
- Ecological facilitation
