= Kenneth A. Kershaw =

British Canadian botanist and lichenologist (1930–2019)

Kenneth Andrew Kershaw FRSC
- Born: September 5, 1930
- Died: December 30, 2019 (aged 89)
- Education: University of Wales, Bangor, UK
- Spouse: Ellen Catherine Bruce
- Children: 3
- Scientific career
- Workplaces: Imperial College, University of London; McMaster University, Canada
- Thesis: A study of pattern in certain plant communities.
- Doctoral advisors: Peter Greig-Smith

Kenneth A. Kershaw (1930–2019) was a botanist and lichenologist, especially studying lichen ecophysiology. He started his career at Imperial College, University of London and was then appointed to the chair in plant ecology at McMaster University in Hamilton, Ontario, Canada. He developed improved experimental equipment and applied numerical methods to the study of lichen ecophysiology. He also became an expert on early Canadian maps and stamps.

== Early life, education and personal life ==
Kenneth Andrew Kershaw was born in Lancashire and brought up in Ashbourne, Derbyshire. He studied botany at the University of Manchester, graduating in 1952. After compulsory National Service in the British military, he undertook doctoral research about plant communities at the University of Wales, Bangor, supervised by Peter Greig-Smith. This work resulted in the award of a PhD in 1957.He also became interested in lichens. In 1968 he was awarded a DSc by Imperial College, University of London.

He married Ellen Catherine Bruce on 1 April 1967 and they had three children together.

== Career ==
Kershaw obtained lectureship in botany at Imperial College, University of London around 1957. Ken and John Tallis published papers on stone polygons in Nature in 1959. He applied quantitative methods to temperate, arctic and tropical plant communities and applied computer modelling and predictive methods from the 1960s onwards. He and his students also worked on lichens, characterising the genera Stereocaulon and Umbilicaria and also undertook ecophysiological investigations, including measurements of photosynthesis, carbon dioxide exchange and nitrogen fixation. He worked on it with microbial biochemist John Millbank.

Kershaw participated in college expeditions to Norway, Nigeria and Iceland.

In 1969 he migrated to the post of Professor of Plant Ecology at McMaster University in Canada. The lichen dominated Canadian arctic boreal environment was now readily accessible for his research. He collaborated with a climatologist, Wayne Rouse, for over a decade studying the impact of microclimates on lichen physiology. His other research programmes focused on lichens in woodland and continued to investigate photosynthesis and nitrogen fixation. He significantly improved equipment for making these measurements on lichens.In a 1975 expedition to Hudson Bay Lowlands. During the expedition they went on a mini expedition to a forest tundra area to the south, Kershaw and his team were chased by a polar bear. Kershaw retired in 1988.

After retirement, he had a business selling old maps and prints, and gained recognition for expertise in early Canadian maps and stamps. He was also involved in a family restaurant business.

== Publications ==
Kershaw was the author of popular book about lichens and books on early Canadian maps and stamps in addition to scientific publications and monographs. These included:

- Kenneth A. Kershaw (1993, 1996, 2002) Early Printed Maps of Canada in four volumes (1540-1703, 1703 - 1799, regions of Canada).
- Kenneth A. Kershaw and John Henry H. Looney (1985) Quantitative and dynamic plant ecology London : Edward Arnold; 1985.
- Kershaw KA (1985) Physiological Ecology of Lichens. Cambridge: Cambridge University Press.
- MacFarlane JD and Kershaw KA (1978) Thermal sensitivity in lichens. Science 201 739–741.
- Larson DW and Kershaw KA (1975) Acclimation in arctic lichens. Nature 254 421–423.
- Kershaw KA and Rouse WR (1971) Studies on lichen-dominated systems. I. The water relations of Cladonia alpestris in spruce-lichen woodland in northern Ontario. Canadian Journal of Botany 49 1389–1399.
- Kenneth A. Kershaw (1966) Quantitative and dynamic plant ecology London : Edward Arnold; (Second edition 1985 with John Henry H. Looney)'
- K.A. Kershaw and K.L. Alvin (1963) The Observer’s Book of Lichens, Frederick Warne
- Tallis JH and Kershaw KA (1959) Stability of stone polygons in North Wales. Nature 183 485–486.

He was the line-drawing illustrator of two books by Ursula Duncan, Lichen Illustrations (1963), Supplement to “A Guide to the Study of Lichens”. Arbroath: T. Buncle & Co Ltd. and Introduction to British Lichens (1970) Arbroath: T. Buncle & Co Ltd.

== Honours and awards ==
Kershaw was elected a Fellow of the Royal Society of Canada in 1980.
