= British Ecological Society =

UK learned society in the field of ecology

Coordinates: 51°31′21.97″N 0°6′54.93″W

The British Ecological Society is a learned society in the field of ecology that was founded in 1913. It is the oldest ecological society in the world. The Society's original objective was "to promote and foster the study of Ecology in its widest sense" and this remains the central theme guiding its activities today. The Society had, circa 2024 around 7,000 members of which 14% are students. Of its members in 2013, 42% were outside the United Kingdom, in a total of 92 countries. The head office is located in London.

== History ==
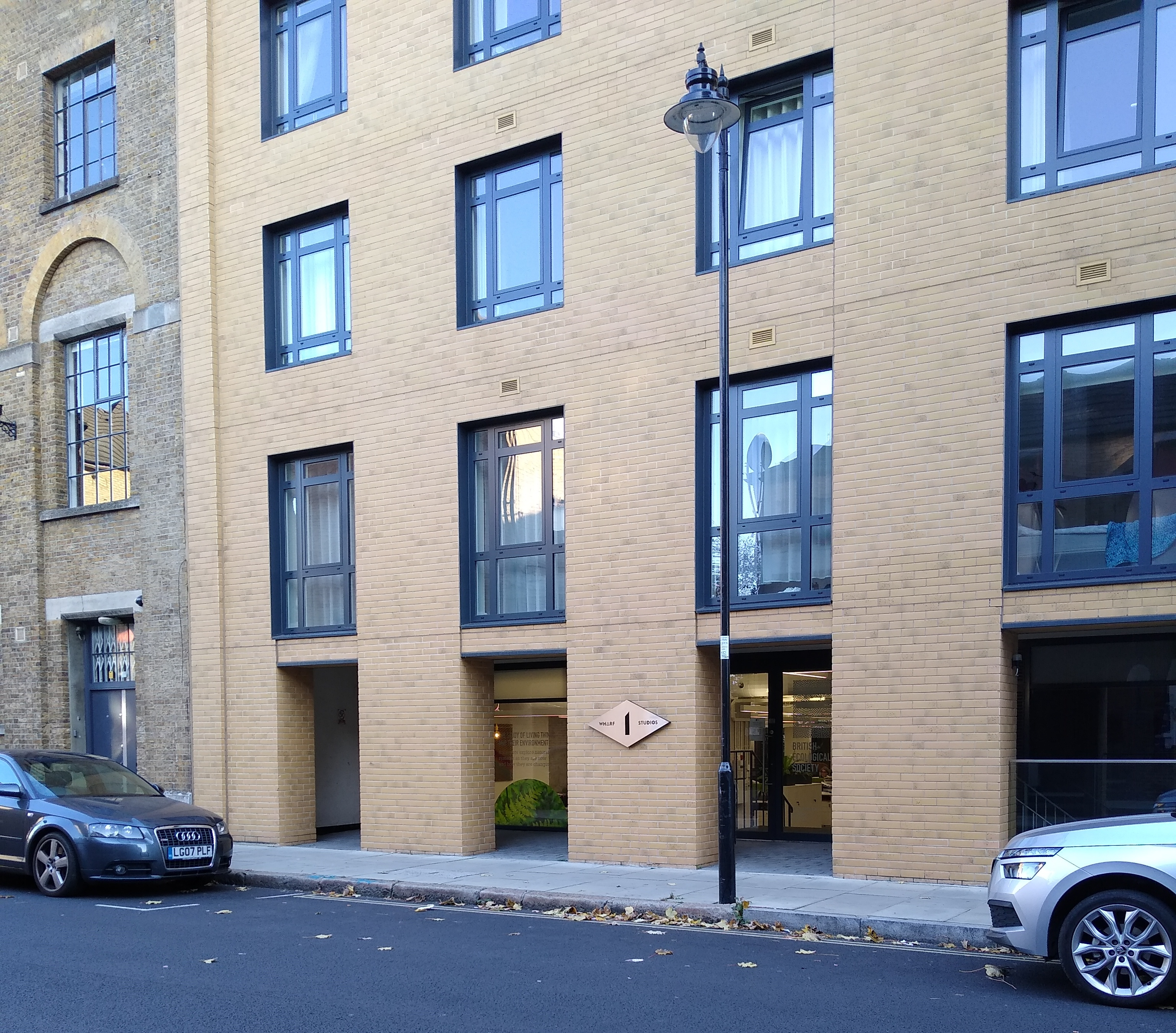
British Ecological Society headquarters on Wharf Road, London

The Society evolved out of the British Vegetation Committee, which was founded in 1904 to promote the survey and study of vegetation in the British Isles. This initiative was in turn the outcome of what many historians perceive to have been the emergence of modern ecology in the 1890s. The British Ecological Society's inaugural meeting was held at University College London on 12 April 1913 and was attended by 47 members. Sir Arthur Tansley became the first President and the first issue of Journal of Ecology was printed in time for the meeting.

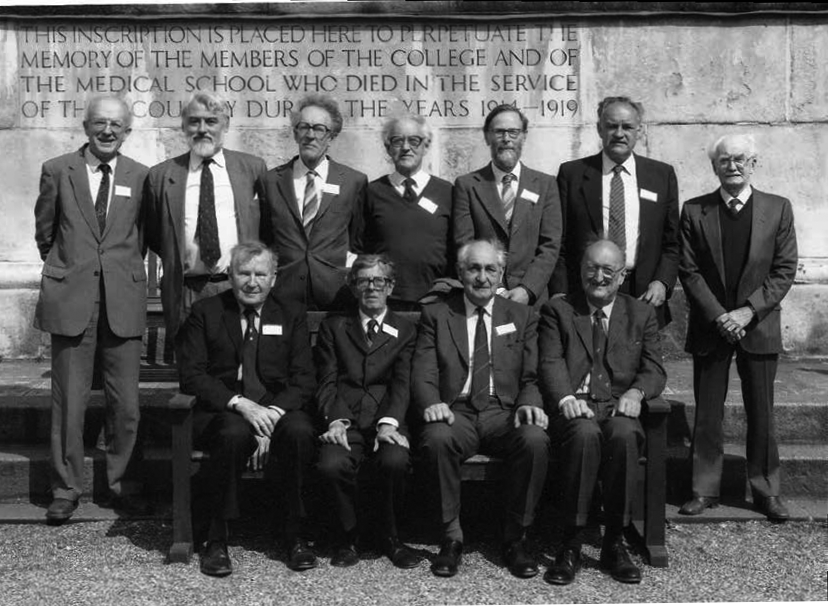
75th Anniversary Jubilee Symposium for the British Ecological Society at University College, London, April 1988, with past presidents gathered for a team photograph

The Society faced several setbacks and was largely impacted by the events of World War I, as it formed the year prior to its beginning.

In its early days the society shared the London offices of The Linnean Society. Today it is member of the umbrella organisation European Ecological Federation (EEF).

== Publications ==
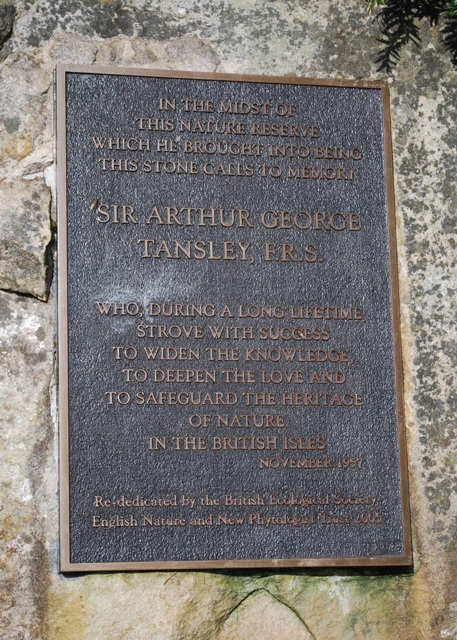
Monument to first President Arthur G. Tansley, Kingley Vale National Nature Reserve, West Sussex

Publication of scientific journals is a principal activity. The Journal of Ecology was first published in 1913 in time for the inaugural meeting of the Society, followed by the Journal of Animal Ecology (1932), Journal of Applied Ecology (1962), Functional Ecology (1987), and Methods in Ecology and Evolution (2010). In 2018, the society launched People and Nature, an Open Access interdisciplinary journal publishing work exploring relationships between humans and nature, followed by Ecological Solutions and Evidence in 2020. Members can subscribe to these journals at a low cost and also receive a discount on Open Access fees. The Society also partners with Wiley-Blackwell on the open access journal Ecology and Evolution.

The society publishes the Ecological Reviews book series which aims to publish books on the cutting edge of modern ecology, providing a forum for current topics that are likely to be of long-term importance to the progress of the field

In addition, the society publishes a series of freely available short Better Science Guides on topics including Peer Review, Data Management, Interdisciplinary Research, Safe Fieldwork, Reproducible Code and Getting Published.

The society also runs a photographic competition.

== Meetings ==
The Society also runs several major scientific meetings for ecologists each year. The annual meeting currently attracts 1,200 delegates each year and provides the opportunity for ecologists to present papers and posters on a wide variety of topics; an important element has always been the active participation of research students. There is an increasing number of delegates from overseas, principally Europe. It is Europe's largest annual meeting of ecologists. Since 1960 the Society has run an Annual Symposium and published a volume of its papers. It supports a range of other specialist meetings, workshops, training events and field meetings.

== Presidents ==
- 1913–1914 Arthur Tansley
- 1917-1918 William Gardner Smith
- 1920-1921 Richard Henry Yapp
- 1921–1922 Robert Lloyd Praeger
- 1923–1924 Frederick Ernest Weiss
- 1927–1928 Edward James Salisbury
- 1931–1932 Arthur Edwin Boycott
- 1933–1934 James Robert Matthews
- 1935–1936 William Harold Pearsall
- 1937–1938 Arthur Tansley (2nd term)
- 1946–1947 Alexander Watt
- 1954–1956 Arthur Roy Clapham
- 1958–1959 Norman Alan Burges
- 1962–1963 Paul Westmacott Richards
- 1964–1965 David Lack
- 1966–1967 John L. Harper
- 1968–1969 Henry Neville Southern
- 1970–1971 John Laker Harley
- 1974–1975 George Clifford Evans
- 1976–1977 Richard Southwood
- 1980–1981 George Mackenzie Dunnet
- 1982–1983 Anthony David Bradshaw
- 1984–1985 L.R. Taylor
- 1986–1987 C. H. Gimingham
- 1988–1989 R. J. Berry
- 1990–1991 Peter J. Grubb
- 1992–1993 Robert May, Baron May of Oxford
- 1994–1995 Ian Newton
- 1996–1997 John A. Lee
- 1998–1999 Michael Hassell
- 2000–2001 John Whittaker
- 2002–2003 John Grace
- 2003–2005 Alastair Fitter
- 2005–2007 John Lawton
- 2007–2009 Malcolm Press
- 2009–2011 Charles Godfray
- 2011–2013 Georgina Mace
- 2013–2015 William Sutherland
- 2016–2017 Sue Hartley
- 2017–2019 Richard Bardgett
- 2020–2021 Jane Memmott
- 2021–2023 Yadvinder Malhi
- 2024–2025 Bridget Emmett
