= William Gardner Smith (botanist) =

Scottish botanist and ecologist

- Born: 20 March 1866; Dundee
- Died: 8 December 1928 (aged 62); Edinburgh
- Education: University of Dundee; Ludwig-Maximilians-Universität München
- Scientific career
- Fields: Botany, ecology

William Gardner Smith (20 March 1866, Dundee, UK – 8 December 1928, Edinburgh, UK) was a Scottish botanist and ecologist who pioneered the study and mapping of the vegetation of the United Kingdom. He was a founding member of the British Ecological Society.

== Early life and education ==
Smith was born in Dundee, Scotland, and educated at the University College of Dundee, where he obtained a B.Sc. in botany and zoology, and at the Ludwig-Maximilians-Universität München, where he obtained a PhD. At the Ludwig-Maximilians-Universität München, Smith studied plant pathology and translated Carl von Tubeuf's Pflanzenkrankheiten.

== Professional career ==
After graduating from university, Smith taught at the Morgan Academy in Dundee until 1891, when he took a demonstrator's position at the University of Edinburgh working with Isaac Bayley Balfour. From 1892 to 1893, he served as lecturer in agriculture for the County of Forfar. In 1893, he began doctoral work at the Ludwig-Maximilians-Universität München, and in 1894, he returned to the University of Edinburgh, where he lectured in plant physiology. In 1897, he took up a position at the Yorkshire College (which became the University of Leeds in 1904) and then moved to the Edinburgh and East of Scotland College of Agriculture in 1908, where he spent the remainder of his career.

== Major contributions ==
Smith's major contributions came as a consequence of the death of his brother, Robert. Like his brother, Robert Smith had studied at Dundee, but then went on to the University of Montpellier, where he had studied under Charles Flahault, a pioneer of phytogeography and phytosociology. Robert Smith adapted Flahault's sampling method to better suit Scottish vegetation and went on to pioneer vegetation mapping in the British Isles. When he died suddenly in 1900, William Smith completed his brother's unfinished manuscript and took up his own surveys of the vegetation of Yorkshire. In 1903, together with Charles Edward Moss and W. Munn Rankin, he published the first vegetation maps of England. In 1904, together Arthur Tansley, Moss, Rankin and others, Smith established the Central Committee for the Survey and Study of British Vegetation, later renamed the British Vegetation Committee. The group set about coordinating ongoing vegetation surveys and standardizing methodology between them. In 1906, the committee produced a pamphlet entitled Suggestions for Beginning Survey Work on Vegetation. In 1913, the committee organized the British Ecological Society, the first ever professional body of ecologists. Smith served as president of the society in 1918 and 1919.

After returning to Scotland in 1908, Smith worked on agricultural problems, applying an ecological approach to the management of hill pastures.
