= John L. Harper =

British biologist (1925–2009)

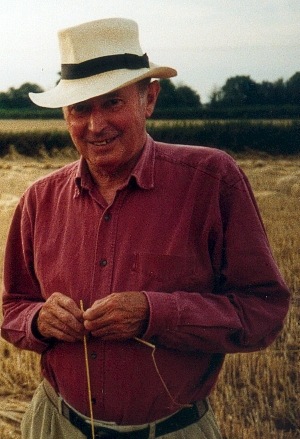
John L. Harper

John Lander Harper CBE FRS (27 May 1925 – 22 March 2009) was a British biologist, specializing in ecology and plant population biology.

== Life ==
He was born in 1925 and educated at Lawrence Sheriff School, Rugby. He obtained his degree in Botany in (1946) and his MA and DPhil (1950) from Oxford with his doctoral thesis An investigation of the interaction of soil micro-organisms with special reference to the study of the bacterial population of plant root systems. Dr Harper spent a further nine years conducting research at the Department of Agriculture, Oxford, and a sabbatical as Rockefeller Foundation Fellow at the University of California, Davis, he was in 1967 appointed head of the newly formed School of Plant Biology at Bangor University North Wales.

He served as president of the British Ecological Society (BES) (1966–1968) and of the European Society for Evolutionary Biology (1993-1995).

He was elected a Fellow of the Royal Society in 1978 and was their Darwin Medal recipient for 1990. He received the Millennium Botany Award in 1999 and the Marsh Ecology Award from the BES the same year. He was awarded CBE in 1989.

He has authored several textbooks on ecology and population biology.

The British Ecological Society awards the John L. Harper Young Investigator's prize annually to the best paper in Journal of Ecology by a young author. He was a member of the British Humanist Association.

He died on 22 March 2009.

== Publications ==
=== Ecology text book ===
- 2006 - Ecology: from individuals to ecosystems (4th edition) with Michael Begon and Colin R. Townsend ISBN 1-4051-1117-8 (formerly known as Ecology: individuals, populations and communities, three editions (1986, 1990 and 1996), with Michael Begon and Colin R. Townsend ISBN 0-632-03801-2 (1996 edition))
- 2003 - Essentials of Ecology (2nd edition) with Michael Begon and Colin R. Townsend ISBN 1-4051-0328-0

=== Scholarly books ===
- 1997 - Plant life histories : ecology, phylogeny, and evolution, Editor ISBN 0-521-57495-1
- 1977 - Population biology of plants ISBN 0-12-325850-2

== Selected highly cited scientific papers ==
- Harper, J.L., J.T. Williams & G.R. Sagar (1965) The Behaviour of Seeds in Soil: I. The Heterogeneity of Soil surfaces and its Role in Determining the Establishment of Plants from Seed. Journal of Ecology 53 (2): 273-286. JStor
- J.L. Harper (1967) A Darwinian Approach to Plant Ecology. Journal of Ecology 55 (2): 247-270. JStor
- White, James & J.L. Harper (1970) Correlated Changes in Plant Size and Number in Plant Populations Journal of Ecology 58 (2): 467-485. JStor
- Harper, John L. & John Ogden (1970) The Reproductive Strategy of Higher Plants: I. The Concept of Strategy with Special Reference to Senecio vulgaris L. Journal of Ecology 58 (3): 681-698. JStor
- Ross, M.A. & John L. Harper (1972) Occupation of Biological Space During Seedling Establishment. Journal of Ecology 60 (1): 77-88. JStor
