= Jane Memmott =

British ecologist and entomologist

Jane Memmott OBE FRS
- Education: University of Leeds (BSc, PhD)
- Scientific career
- Workplaces: University of Bristol

Jane Memmott is an ecologist and entomologist from the United Kingdom. She is professor of ecology at the University of Bristol. Her research focuses on community ecology and she is an expert on the interactions between insect pollinators and plants.

== Education and career ==
Memmott attended the University of Leeds where she studied zoology in the early 1980s. She continued her studies at Leeds, where she eventually obtained her PhD. She also worked on the community ecology of phlebotomine sandflies, doing fieldwork in Costa Rica. As a postdoctoral researcher she constructed the first food webs in tropical ecosystems, looking at plants, leaf-miners, and parasitoids, working with Charles Godfray. She furthermore did research of invasive plants in New Zealand.

In 1996 Memmott transferred to the University of Bristol as a lecturer. In 2012 she was appointed Head of the School of Biological Sciences where she oversaw the school's transition to a new Life Sciences building.

== Research ==
Memmott's studies a wide range of areas in ecology including pollination ecology, invasion ecology, agro-ecology, biological control, urban ecology, and restoration ecology.

Her work in urban habitats includes the urban pollinators project (part of the Insect Pollinators Initiative). In this project, Memmott and her team sample insect pollinators in 1 km long transects in urban areas. They found that private residential gardens, allotments, and community gardens had a higher abundance of insect pollinators than public amenity gardens, such as parks and road verges.

Memmott is an advocate of providing resources in urban habitats to sustain pollinators. In particular she advocates for growing areas of wildflowers, which have plants with more nectar and pollen than many cultivated plant varieties. Memmott found that these areas of wildflowers can provide more foraging resources for pollinators.

She has also studied the way in which resources available to insect pollinators have changed over the past century as well as the changes that occur over a one-year period. In her research of long-term vegetation surveys she found that nectar resources in the UK declined up to the 1970s, during agricultural intensification, but since then resources have increased. On a smaller timescale, Memmott found a potential for mismatch in the timing between flowering plants and the flight times of pollinators that visit them through the year.

Memmott also researches agroecosystems. Her research has shown that there are significant gaps seasonally in resources for pollinators from plants, such as pollen and nectar, in early spring and late summer; this knowledge could be used to alter the species mix of wildflower strips as part of agri-environment schemes.

== Honours and awards ==
Memmott is a reviewing editor on Science Magazine.

She was awarded the Marsh Ecology Award by the Marsh Christian Trust and the British Ecological Society (BES) in 2015.

In 2018 she gave the Sir John Burnett Memorial Lecture at the National Biodiversity Network annual conference.

Memmott was made President Elect of the British Ecological Society in 2019, and became President at the beginning of 2020.

Memmott was appointed Officer of the Order of the British Empire (OBE) in the 2021 Birthday Honours for services to insect pollinators and ecology.

She was elected a Fellow of the Royal Society in 2023, and of the BES in 2025.
