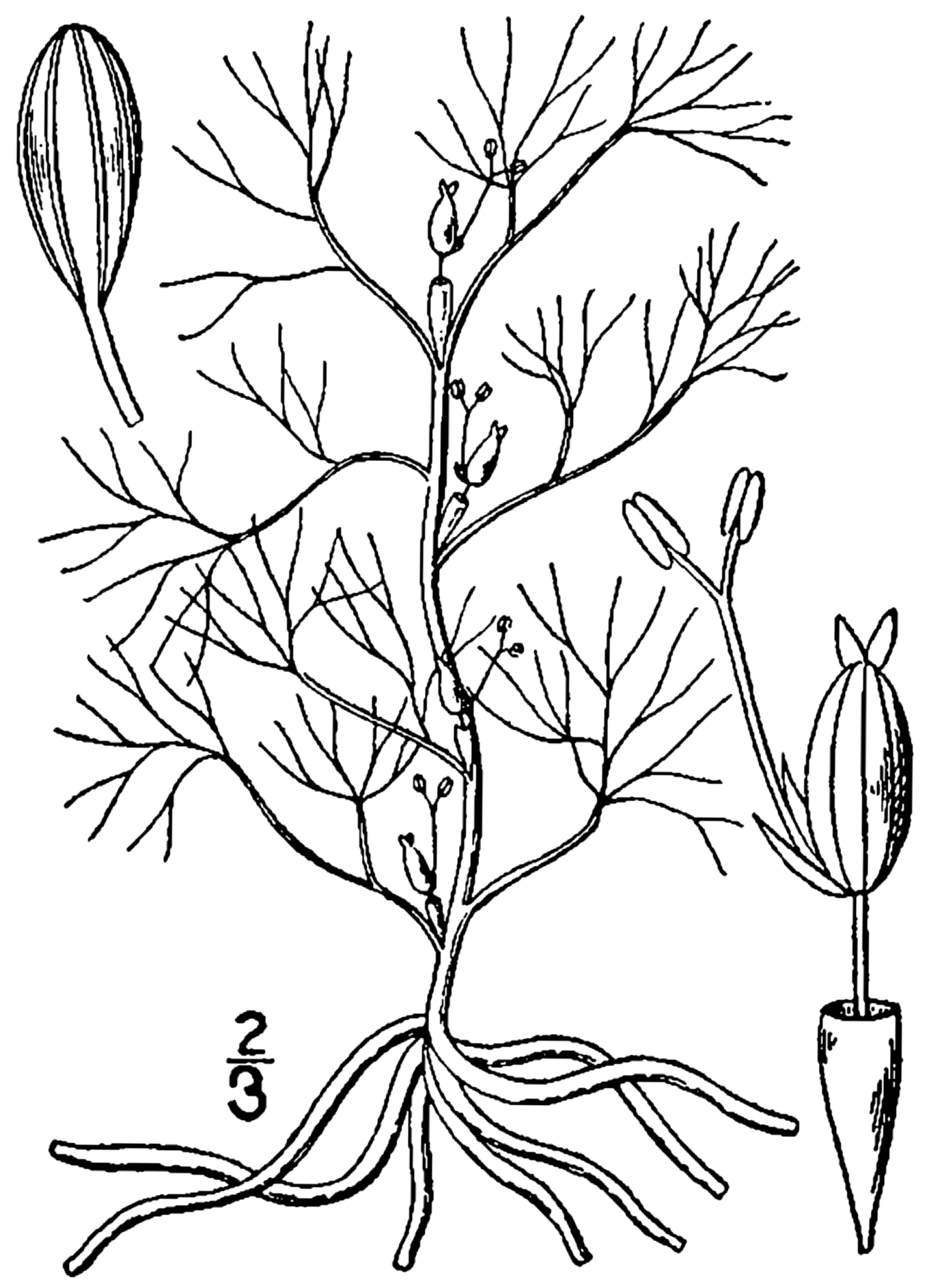
- Podostemum ceratophyllum

Scientific classification
- Kingdom: Plantae
- Clade: Tracheophytes
- Clade: Angiosperms
- Clade: Eudicots
- Clade: Rosids
- Order: Malpighiales
- Family: Podostemaceae
- Genus: Podostemum; Michx. (1803), nom. cons.

Species
- 11; see text

Synonyms
- Crenias Spreng. (1827); Devillea Tul. & Wedd. (1849); Dicraea Tul. (1849), orth. var.; Dicraeia Thouars (1806), nom. superfl.; Mavaelia Trimen (1895), not validly publ.; Mniopsis Mart. (1824), nom. illeg.

= Podostemum =

Genus of aquatic plants

Podostemum is a genus of flowering plants in the family Podostemaceae. It is an aquatic plant with threadlike roots that attaches to rocks. It includes 11 species native to the Americas, ranging from eastern Canada through the eastern and south-central United States, and from southern Mexico to northeastern Argentina.

== Species ==
11 species are currently accepted.

- Podostemum ceratophyllum Michx., 1803: Eastern Canada to Eatstern United States, Honduras, Hispaniola.
- Podostemum comatum Hicken, 1917: Brazil (São Paulo) to Northeast Argentina.
- Podostemum distichum (Cham.) Wedd., 1873: Brazil to Northeast Argentina.
- Podostemum flagelliforme (Tul. & Wedd.) C.T.Philbrick & Novelo, 2004: Brazil (Tocantins).
- Podostemum irgangii C.T.Philbrick & Novelo, 2001: South Brazil.
- Podostemum muelleri Warm., 1911: Brazil (Southeast São Paulo) to Northeast Argentina.
- Podostemum ovatum C.T.Philbrick & Novelo, 2004: Southeast Brazil.
- Podostemum rutifolium Warm., 1899: South Brazil to Northeast Argentina.
- Podostemum saldanhanum (Warm.) C.T.Philbrick & Novelo, 2004: Brazil (Rio de Janeiro).
- Podostemum scaturiginum (Mart.) C.T.Philbrick & Novelo, 2004: Central Brazil.
- Podostemum weddellianum (Tul.) C.T.Philbrick & Novelo, 2004: Eats and South Brazil.
