= Ecology: From Individuals to Ecosystems =

Book by Michael Begon, Colin Townsend and John Harper

- 4th edition cover
- Author: Michael Begon, Colin R. Townsend, John L. Harper
- Cover artist: Christopher Meech (mural), cover design by cyandesign.co.uk
- Language: English
- Subject: Ecology
- Publisher: Blackwell Publishing
- Publication date: July 2005
- Media type: Hard cover
- Pages: 752
- ISBN: 978-1-4051-1117-1
- OCLC: 57675855
- Dewey Decimal: 577 22
- LC Class: QH541 .B415 2006

Ecology: From Individuals to Ecosystems is a 2006 higher education textbook on general ecology written by Michael Begon, Colin R. Townsend and John L. Harper. Published by Blackwell Publishing, it is now in its fourth edition. The first three editions were published by Blackwell Science under the title Ecology: Individuals, Populations and Communities. Since it first became available it has had a positive reception, and has long been one of the leading textbooks on ecology.

== Background and history ==
The book is written by Michael Begon of the University of Liverpool's School of Biosciences, Colin Townsend, from the Department of Zoology of New Zealand's University of Otago, and the University of Exeter's John L. Harper. The first edition was published in 1986. This was followed in 1990 with a second edition. The third edition became available in 1996. The most recent edition appeared in 2006 under the new subtitle From Individuals to Ecosystems.

One of the book's authors, John L. Harper, is now deceased. The fourth edition cover is an image of a mural on a Wellington street created by Christopher Meech and a group of urban artists to generate thought about the topic of environmental degradation. It reads "we did not inherit the earth from our ancestors, we borrowed it from our children."

== Contents ==
Part 1. ORGANISMS

1. Organisms in their environments: the evolutionary backdrop

2. Conditions

3. Resources

4. Life, death and life histories

5. Intraspecific competition

6. Dispersal, dormancy and metapopulations

7. Ecological applications at the level of organisms and single-species populations

Part 2. SPECIES INTERACTIONS

8. Interspecific competition

A typical page from the ninth chapter, which discusses the nature of predation.

9. The nature of predation

10. The population dynamics of predation

11. Decomposers and detritivores

12. Parasitism and disease

13. Symbiosis and mutualism

14. Abundance

15. Ecological applications at the level of population interactions

Part 3. COMMUNITIES AND ECOSYSTEMS

16. The nature of the community

17. The flux of energy through ecosystems

18. The flux of matter through ecosystems

19. The influence of population interactions on community structure

20. Food webs

21. Patterns in species richness

22. Ecological applications at the level of communities and ecosystems
