= Arthur Tansley =

English botanist and pioneer in ecology

Sir Arthur Tansley
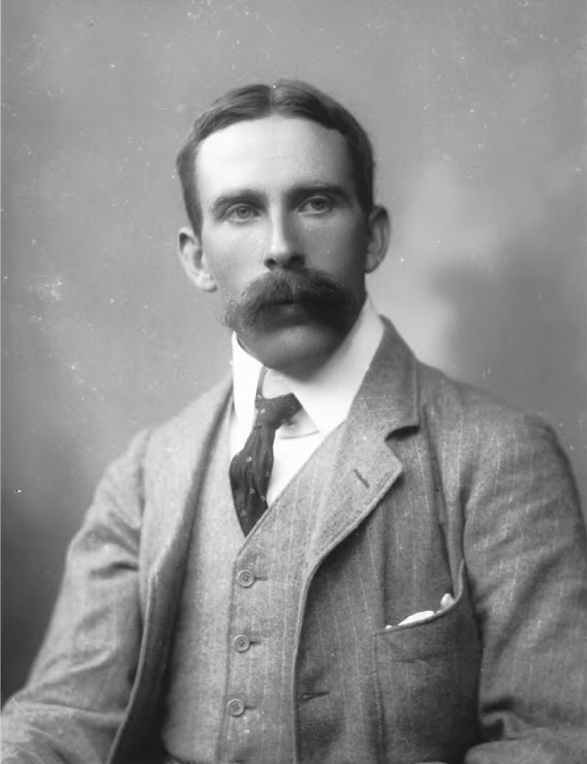
- Arthur Tansley in the 1890s
- Born: Arthur George Tansley; 15 August 1871; London, England
- Died: 25 November 1955 (aged 84); Grantchester, England
- Known for: New Phytologist, British Ecological Society, Ecosystem concept
- Spouse(s): Edith, Lady Tansley (née Chick)
- Awards: Linnean Medal (1941); Fellow of the Royal Society
- Scientific career
- Notable students: Alexander Watt

Sir Arthur George Tansley FLS, FRS (15 August 1871 – 25 November 1955) was an English botanist and a pioneer in the science of ecology.

Educated at Highgate School, University College London and Trinity College, Cambridge, Tansley taught at these universities and at Oxford, where he served as Sherardian Professor of Botany until his retirement in 1937. Tansley founded the New Phytologist in 1902 and served as its editor until 1931. He was a pioneer of the science of ecology in Britain, being heavily influenced by the work of Danish botanist Eugenius Warming, and introduced the concept of the ecosystem into biology. Tansley was a founding member of the first professional society of ecologists, the Central Committee for the Survey and Study of British Vegetation, which later organised the British Ecological Society, and served as its first president and founding editor of the Journal of Ecology. Tansley also served as the first chairman of the British Nature Conservancy.

Tansley was elected a Fellow of the Royal Society in 1915, and knighted in 1950.

The New Phytologist publishes regular Tansley Reviews, while the New Phytologist Trust awards a Tansley Medal, both named in his honour.

== Early life and education ==
Tansley was born in London to businessman George Tansley and his wife Amelia. Although a successful businessman, George Tansley's passion had been education after he started attending classes at the Working Men's College when he was 19. George Tansley later went on to be a volunteer teacher, retiring from his business in 1884 to dedicate himself to teaching at the college. He married Amelia Lawrence in 1863 and had two children – the older a daughter, Maud, followed by Arthur seven years later, in 1871.

Tansley's interest in science was sparked by one of his father's fellow volunteer-teachers, who was described as "an excellent and enthusiastic field botanist". After attending preparatory school from the ages of 12 to 15, he enrolled in Highgate School. Unhappy with the science teaching, which he considered "farcically inadequate", he switched to University College London in 1889 and studied at the faculty of Biological science, where he was heavily influenced by Ray Lankester and F. W. Oliver. In 1890 Tansley attended Trinity College, Cambridge. After completing Part I of Tripos in 1893, he returned to University College London as an assistant to Oliver, a position he retained until 1907. In 1894 he returned to Cambridge and completed Part II of Tripos, and received a degree with first class honours.

== Professional career ==
Tansley taught and conducted research at University College London from 1893 until 1907. In 1907 he took a Lecturer position at the University of Cambridge. During the First World War, with very little teaching going on at the university, Tansley took a position as a clerk with the Ministry of Munitions. In 1923 he resigned his position at Cambridge and spent a year in Vienna studying psychology under Sigmund Freud. When he returned to Britain in 1924 Tansley was appointed acting chairman of the British Empire Vegetation Committee. After four years away from a formal academic position in botany, Tansley was appointed Sherardian Professor of Botany at the University of Oxford in 1927, where he remained until his retirement in 1937.

== Major contributions ==
Tansley's early publications focused on palaeobotany, especially fern evolution. Tansley founded the botany journal New Phytologist in 1902 to serve as "a medium of easy communication and discussion between British botanists on all matters . . . including methods of teaching and research". It was named after The Phytologist, a botanical magazine published between 1842 and 1863. In establishing this journal, Tansley's aim was to provide a venue for the publication of "notes and suggestions"; existing botanical journals only published records of completed research. He remained editor of the journal until 1931.

Tansley's introduction to ecology came in 1898 when he read Warming's Plantesamfund (in its German translation, Lehrbuch der ökologischen Pflanzengeographie). Reading the book provoked him to "[go] out into the field to see how far one could match the plant communities Warming had described for Denmark in the English countryside". In 1903 he learned of the work done by the Smith brothers in mapping the vegetation of Scotland and Yorkshire. The work was initiated by Robert Smith and continued by his brother, William Gardner Smith (in conjunction with Charles Edward Moss) after Robert's death. In 1904 Tansley suggested the formation of a central body for the systematic survey and mapping of the British Isles. This led to the establishment of the Central Committee for the Survey and Study of British Vegetation by Tansley, Moss, William Smith and T. W. Woodhead, with the support of Marcel Hardy, F. J. Lewis, Lloyd Praeger and W. M. Rankin. These eight formed the original committee, with Tansley as its leader. F. W. Oliver later joined the group as its ninth member. The name of the group was later shortened to the British Vegetation Committee. The aim of the group was to coordinate ongoing studies and standardise the methodology being used. The committee met twice more in 1905 and produced a six-page pamphlet, Suggestions for Beginning Survey Work on Vegetation.

In 1911 Tansley, in conjunction with the British Vegetation Committee, organised the first International Phytogeographic Excursion (IPE). He was inspired by a plant geography tour of Switzerland organised by Swiss botanist Carl Schröter in 1908, which introduced him not only to vegetation types, but also to botanists from other countries. The connections made between Tansley and American ecologists Henry Chandler Cowles and Frederic Clements helped build a philosophical and methodological link between British and American plant ecology. Other attendees included Schröter, Swedish botanist Carl Lindman, and German botanists Oscar Drude and Paul Graebner. Tansley's book Types of British Vegetation was prepared with an eye to serving as a guide to the vegetation for the attendees of the first IPE. The second IPE in 1913 was hosted by Cowles. This brought Tansley to America.

In 1913, the British Vegetation Committee organised the British Ecological Society (BES), the first-ever professional society of ecologists. Tansley served as its first president, and was first editor of the Journal of Ecology, a position he held for 21 years. In 1915 he was elected a Fellow of the Royal Society, and in 1923 he was elected president of the Botanical Section of the British Association for the Advancement of Science. At the Imperial Botanical Congress in 1924 he was appointed chairman of the British Empire Vegetation Committee. He served as president of the BES a second time in 1938.

William S. Cooper considered Tansley's most influential publications synthesised individual studies into a whole. In 1935 Tansley published "The use and abuse of vegetational terms and concepts" in which he introduced the ecosystem concept. (Note: The term ecosystem was actually coined by Arthur Roy Clapham, who came up with the word at Tansley's request. (Willis 1997)) In the 1930s ecological thinking was dominated by the work of Clements, who thought of ecological communities as organisms, and associations as superorganisms. Tansley questioned the concept by proposing the idea that ecological communities could be regarded as quasi-organisms and he devised it to draw attention to the importance of transfers of materials between organisms and their environment, regarding ecosystems as the basic units of nature.

Though the organisms may claim our prime interest, when we are trying to think fundamentally, we cannot separate them from their special environments, with which they form one physical system.

Tansley's interest in teaching led to the production of the Elements of Plant Ecology in 1922, which was followed by Practical Plant Ecology in 1923 and Aims and methods in the study of vegetation in 1926, coauthored with Thomas Ford Chipp. The last book, edited for the British Empire Vegetation Committee, was extremely influential not just in defining ecological methods but in highlighting the need for a complete inventory of the empire's "vegetational assets". With this information, it would be possible to efficiently manage the vast natural resources of the empire. Tansley's most comprehensive work, The British Islands and Their Vegetation was published in 1939. Volume 2 was published in 1949. In recognition of this achievement, he was awarded the Linnean Medal in 1941.

During the Second World War Tansley became committed to conservation, and this continued through post-war reconstruction. He chaired a committee of the BES that formulated a policy on nature reserves and led to the formation of the Nature Conservancy, which he also chaired. Tansley's conservation work was the basis cited for his knighthood in 1950.

Tansley was introduced to psychology by a former student, Bernard Hart, who worked as a doctor in mental hospitals near London. While working for the Ministry of Munitions during the First World War, he had a dream which was described as "one of the major turning points in his life" – from this dream came Tansley's interest in Freud and psychoanalysis. In 1920 he published The New Psychology and its Relation to Life, one of the first books that attempted to introduce the ideas of Freud and Carl Jung to a general audience. The book was a bestseller, selling 10,000 copies in the United Kingdom and 4,000 in the United States. In 1922 Tansley spent three months with Freud, and the following year he moved his family to Vienna for a year. Although he later returned to botanical pursuits, Tansley remained in contact with Freud and wrote his obituary. Research by Peder Anker has suggested a close theoretical relationship between Tansley's ecology and his psychology.

== Personal life ==
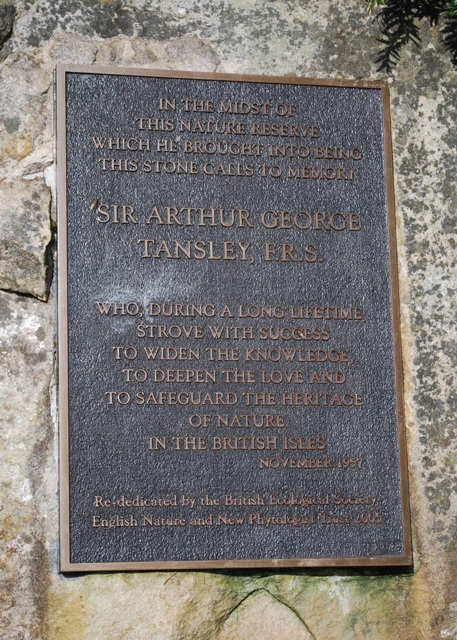
Memorial plaque at Kingley Vale National Nature Reserve.

In 1903 Tansley married Edith Chick, a former student with whom he coauthored two papers. They had three daughters–Katharine, Margaret Tomlinson and Helen. Lady Edith Tansley died in 1970, at age 100.

Tansley was an atheist.

== See also ==
- Hugh M. Raup

== Other sources ==
- Lack, A. (2012). "Peter G. Ayres: Shaping ecology: the life of Arthur Tansley". Journal of Insect Conservation, July.
