= Roy Taylor (footballer) =

Australian rules footballer

Personal information
- Full name: Roy Taylor
- Born: 11 April 1896; Norwood, South Australia
- Died: 11 June 1971 (aged 75); Coburg North, Victoria
- Original team: Beverley

Playing career^{1}
Years	Club	Games (Goals)
1913–14	Richmond City	
1915	Beverley	
1916–18	Richmond (VFL)	33 (13)
1919	Brunswick (VFA)	
- ^{1} Playing statistics correct to the end of 1919.

Roy Taylor (11 April 1896 – 11 June 1971) was an Australian rules footballer who played with Richmond in the Victorian Football League (VFL).

== Family ==
The son of William David Taylor (1858-1905), and Elizabeth Taylor (1862-1915), née Robertson, Roy Taylor was born at Norwood, South Australia on 11 April 1896.

He married Margaret "Maggie" Davey (1983-1964) in 1919.

== Football ==
=== Richmond (VFL) ===
Recruited from Beverley Juniors, he made his debut for Richmond, against Collingwood, at Punt Road, on 6 May 1916, and went on to play in all of the season's 12 home-and-away matches, as well as in Richmond's Semi-Final loss to Carlton, 9.11 (65) to 12.10 (82).

Although he did not play in the 1917 season's first game, against Collingwood, at Victoria Park, on 12 May 1917, he played in each of remaining 14 home-and-away games.

He played in seven of Richmond's fourteen home-and-away matches in 1918.

=== Brunswick (VFA) ===
He was cleared from Richmond to Brunswick in 1919.
