= Frederick Ernest Weiss =

Anglo-German botanist (1865–1953)

Professor Frederick Ernest Weiss FRS FLS VMH
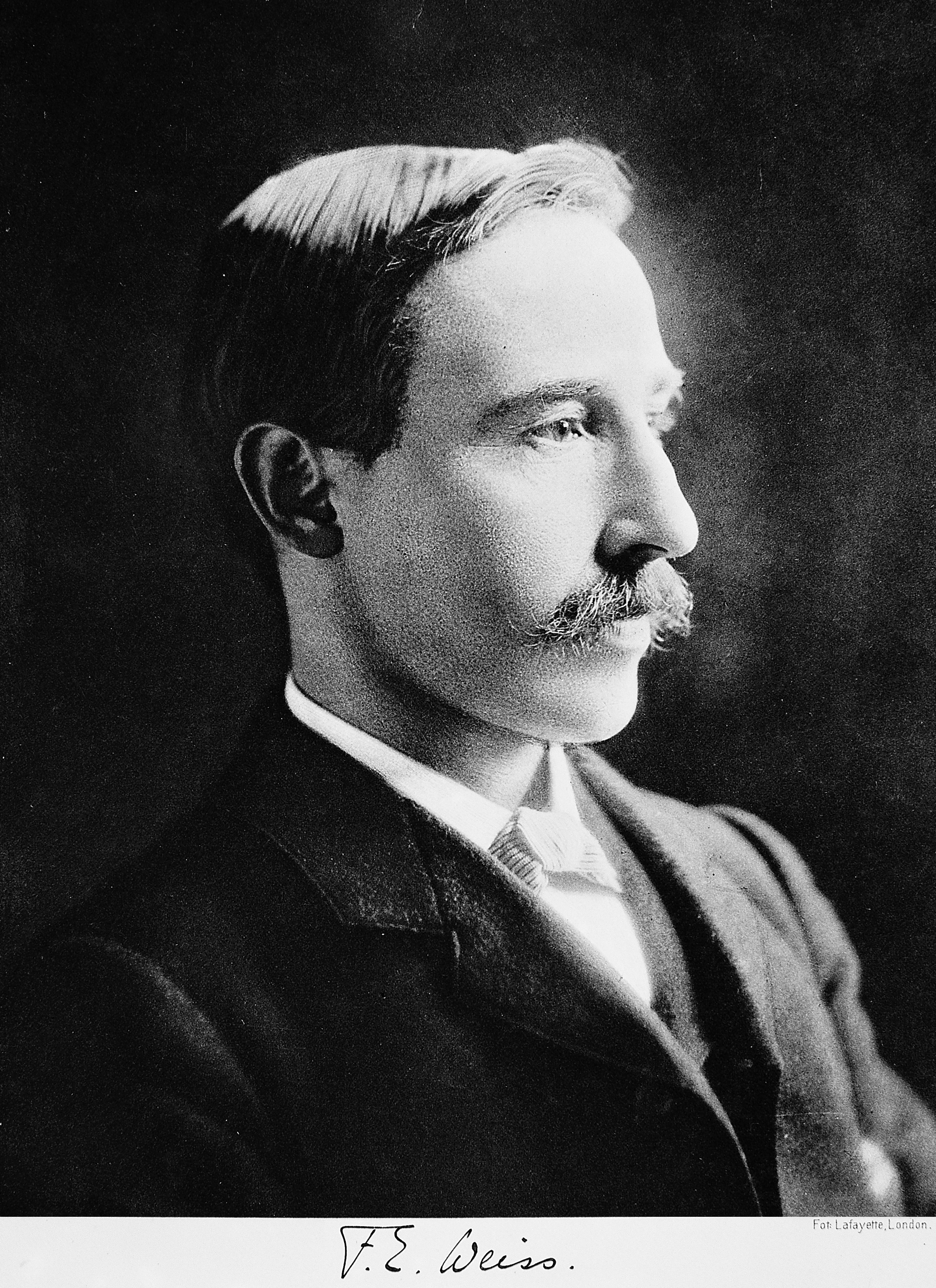
- Frederick Ernest Weiss
- Born: 2 November 1865
- Died: 7 January 1953 (aged 87)
- Education: Owens College, Manchester; University of London
- Occupation: Botanist

Frederick Ernest Weiss FRS FLS VMH (2 November 1865 – 7 January 1953) was an Anglo-German Botanist. He was awarded the Victoria Medal of Honour in 1947.

== Education ==
Weiss was educated at the Owens College (later Victoria University of Manchester), and was elected to membership of the Manchester Literary and Philosophical Society on 16 November 1892. subsequently President of the Society 1911–13. He earned a doctorate in botany (DSc) from the University of London in July 1902.

== Career ==
Weiss was Professor of Botany at the Victoria University of Manchester. In 1913, Weiss succeeded Sir Alfred Hopkinson as vice-chancellor, initially on a temporary basis until a suitable candidate was found. He continued as Professor of Botany during his tenure as vice-chancellor and in 1915 he was succeeded by Sir Henry Alexander Miers, mineralogist and former principal of the University of London (1908–1915).

Professional and academic associations
Preceded by Francis Jones	President of the Manchester Literary and Philosophical Society; 1911–13	Succeeded by Francis Nicholson
