= Roy Taylor (diabetologist) =

British physician

Roy Taylor MBE (born 1952) is a physician, diabetologist, and author who is currently Emeritus Professor of Medicine and Metabolism at Newcastle University UK. He was previously the Director of Newcastle Magnetic Resonance Centre and Honorary Consultant Physician at Newcastle upon Tyne Hospitals NHS Foundation Trust. His Scopus h-index is 65 (As of 2025).

Taylor has worked on identifying the cause of type 2 diabetes leading to programmes for remission and in establishing retinal screening for diabetic eye disease with decreased rates of diabetic blindness in the United Kingdom.

Taylor qualified in medicine at the University of Edinburgh. He has been conducting research on type 2 diabetes since 1978. He founded the Newcastle Magnetic Resonance Centre in 2006 to apply innovative techniques to study in all medical specialities.

In 2011 Taylor tested his Twin Cycle Hypothesis of the cause of type 2 diabetes showing that it was a simple, reversible condition of excess fat within liver and pancreas in the early years after diagnosis. This led to a series of studies, including the Diabetes Remission Clinical Trial which demonstrated that type 2 diabetes can be reversed to normal in Primary Care and that the underlying pathophysiological changes were durable. He has also shown that the whole pancreas is small and irregularly shaped in type 2 diabetes, and that it returns to normal very gradually during 2 years of remission from type 2 diabetes. He developed the Personal Fat Threshold hypothesis together with Professor Rury Holman He then showed that type 2 diabetes in people with normal body mass index had the same cause as in heavier people and long term remission could be achieved by weight loss within the normal body mass index range.

Taylor developed the system now used throughout the United Kingdom for screening for diabetic eye disease, which has resulted in a major reduction in blindness due to diabetes across the UK. He developed teaching aids for retinal screeners — a profession which he pioneered — co-founding the British Association of Retinal Screeners with training programme and recognised professional qualification. He is also the author of a training manual for retinal screeners, The Handbook of Retinal Screening.

In addition, he developed the Newcastle Obstetric Medical service and advanced clinical management in diabetes during pregnancy and also in severe hyperemesis.

He is the author of Life Without Diabetes, a popular guide to understanding and reversing type 2 diabetes and achieving lasting remission.

Taylor was appointed Member of the Order of the British Empire (MBE) in the 2023 New Year Honours for services to diabetic research.

== Major publications ==
See Curriculum vitae
