= Alexander Watt =

Scottish botanist and ecologist (1892–1985)

- Born: Alexander Stuart Watt; 21 June 1892; Aberdeenshire, Scotland
- Died: 2 March 1985 (aged 92); Cambridge, England
- Education: University of Aberdeen
- Known for: cyclic succession in ecology
- Awards: Linnean Medal (1975); Fellow of the Royal Society
- Scientific career
- Fields: Ecology
- Workplaces: University of Cambridge

Alexander Stuart Watt FRS(21 June 1892 – 2 March 1985) was a Scottish botanist and plant ecologist.

== Life ==
Watt was born on an Aberdeenshire farm and went to school at Turriff Secondary School and Robert Gordon's College, Aberdeen. He graduated as MA and BSc (in agricultural science) from the University of Aberdeen in 1913. He then went to University of Cambridge to work on beech forest under Arthur Tansley and obtained a MS in 1919 (after interruption by military service 1916–1918). From working with Tansley, Watt became part of an academic lineage descended from Thomas Henry Huxley and Charles Darwin. Tansley had studied with Francis W. Oliver (1864–1951) at University College, London, who in turn had been mentored by E. Ray Lankester (1847–1929) at University of Cambridge, a student of George Rolleston (1829–1881) at University of Oxford, who had been in turn mentored by Thomas Henry Huxley —"Darwin's bulldog"— in London.

He was appointed lecturer of forest botany and forest zoology at the University of Aberdeen. He continued his research on southern English beech forest in vacations and obtained a PhD from the University of Cambridge in 1924.

In 1929, he became lecturer of forestry at University of Cambridge and, when this undergraduate subject was given up, lecturer of forest botany – "a title which scarcely reflected his wide interest in and influence on plant ecology". He retired from university in 1959, but continued work – publishing in the Journal of Ecology as late as 1982, 63 years after his first publication in this journal.

He accepted to be visiting lecturer at the University of Colorado in 1963 and visiting professor at the University of Khartoum in 1965. In 1970, he co-organized a symposium science in nature conservation.

He was president of the British Ecological Society 1946–1947.

Fellow of the Royal Society since 1957.

He was awarded the Linnean Medal of the Linnean Society in 1975.

== Scientific impact ==
Watt's 1947 paper Pattern and process in the plant community in the Journal of Ecology, being his presidential address to the British Ecological Society, is a true citation classic in scientific ecology. The paper describes the plant community "as a working mechanism, which maintains and regenerates itself". The view it advocated that a plant community consists of a mosaic of phases differing in the stage of the life cycle of the dominant species, with correlated effects on the accompanying species. One of the examples given by Watt concerns the dynamics between grasses and dwarf-shrubs in sandy heathland. The 50th anniversary of the paper was celebrated by a special issue of the Journal of Vegetation Science.

Watt published a long series of scientific papers in the New Phytologist under the collective heading "Contributions to the ecology of bracken" (1940–1971). Watt was a posthumous co-author of the substantive account on bracken in the Biological Flora of the British Isles. Watt wrote a series of preliminary drafts that were extended and updated by his co-author.

Much of Watt's field studies were centred on the Breckland not far from Cambridge. Here, he studied the effect of grazing and dereliction on grassland vegetation.
