= Aaron M. Ellison =

American ecologist

Aaron M. Ellison is an American ecologist, photographer, sculptor, and writer. He retired in July 2021 after 20 years as the senior research fellow in ecology at Harvard University and as a Senior Ecologist at the Harvard Forest. He also served as deputy director of the Harvard Forest from 2018 to 2021. Until 2018, he also was an adjunct research professor at the University of Massachusetts in the Departments of Biology and Environmental Conservation. Ellison has both authored and co-authored numerous scientific papers, books, book reviews and software reviews. For more than 30 years, Ellison has studied food-web dynamics and community ecology of wetlands and forests; the evolutionary ecology of carnivorous plants; the responses of plants and ants to global climate change; application of Bayesian statistical inference to ecological research and environmental decision-making; and the critical reaction of Ecology to Modernism. In 2012 he was elected a fellow of the Ecological Society of America. He was the editor-in-chief of Ecological Monographs from 2008 to 2015, was a senior editor of Methods in Ecology and Evolution from 2018-2021, and since 2021 has been the executive editor of Methods in Ecology and Evolution.

== Career ==
Ellison was born in 1960 in Philadelphia, Pennsylvania, United States. He attended Yale University, where he studied East Asian studies/Asian philosophy and obtained his B.A. in 1982. He later went on to obtain his Ph.D. in ecology and evolutionary biology at Brown University in 1986. Ellison's postdoctoral positions were with the Organization for Tropical Studies in Costa Rica, Department of Biology, Tulane University, 1988–1989, and Cornell University, Section of Ecology and Systematics and Ecosystems Research Center, 1986–1988.

He spent a year educating students at Swarthmore College and in 1990 he moved to a permanent position at Mount Holyoke College. At Mount Holyoke, he was an assistant, associate, and full professor of biology and environmental studies, educating students in biology, environmental studies and statistics until 2001. He also served as sponsored research officer and associate dean for science. After a year's sabbatical at Harvard Forest as a Charles Bullard Fellow, he moved to Harvard Forest as a senior ecologist in 2002.

After retiring from Harvard in 2021, Aaron co-founded, with Manisha Patel, the company Sound Solutions for Sustainable Science, which develops and provides a range of consulting services, workshops, and programs.

== Honours and awards ==
- 1992 – Presidential Faculty Fellow, U.S. National Science Foundation
- 2004 – Eminent Ecologist, Kellogg Biological Station
- 2012 – Elected Fellow, Ecological Society of America
- 2014 – Human Diversity Award (for the Harvard Forest Summer Undergraduate Research Program), Organization of Biological Field Stations
- 2022 - Natural Sciences Fellow, Swedish Collegium for Advanced Study
- 2022 - Humboldt Prize (Humboldt Research Award)

== Books ==
- A primer of ecological statistics (1st and 2nd editions). 2004/2012. Gotelli, N. J. & A. M. Ellison. Oxford University Press, New York, New York, USA.
- A field guide to the ants of New England. 2012. Ellison, A. M., N. J. Gotelli, G. Alpert, and E. J. Farnsworth. Yale University Press, New Haven, Connecticut, USA.
- Stepping in the same river twice: replication in biological research. 2017. Shavit, A. & A. M. Ellison (editors). Yale University Press, New Haven, Connecticut, USA.
- Vanishing point: poetry and photography from the Pacific northwest. 2017. Ellison, A. M. BookBaby.
- Carnivorous plants: physiology, ecology, and evolution. 2018. Ellison, A. M. & L. Adamec (editors). Oxford University Press, Oxford, UK.
- Causes and consequences of species diversity in forest ecosystems. 2019. Ellison, A. M. & F. S. Gilliam (editors). MDPI Books, Basel, Switzerland.
- Scaling in ecology in a model system. 2021. Ellison, A. M. & N. J. Gotelli. Monographs in Population Biology, number 64. Princeton University Press, Princeton, New Jersey, USA.
