= Functional Ecology (journal) =

- Discipline: Functional ecology
- Language: English
- Edited by: Lara Ferry, Enrico Rezende, Katie Field, Emma Sayer, Chuck Fox

Publication details
- History: 1987–present
- Publisher: Wiley-Blackwell on behalf of the British Ecological Society (United Kingdom)
- Frequency: Monthly
- Impact factor: 6.28 (2021)

Standard abbreviations
- ISO 4: Funct. Ecol.

Indexing
- CODEN: FECOE5
- ISSN: 0269-8463 (print); 1365-2435 (web)
- LCCN: 91656038
- OCLC no.: 15596280

Links
- Journal homepage; Online access; Online archive

Functional Ecology is a monthly peer-reviewed scientific journal covering physiological, behavioural, and evolutionary ecology, as well as ecosystems and community ecology, emphasizing an integrative approach.

The journal was established in 1987 and is published by Wiley-Blackwell on behalf of the British Ecological Society. The editors-in-chief are Lara Ferry (Arizona State University), Charles Fox (University of Kentucky), Katie Field (University of Sheffield), Emma Sayer (University of Lancaster), and Enrico Rezende (Pontifical Catholic University of Chile).

== Abstracting and indexing ==
The journal is abstracted and indexed in Aquatic Sciences and Fisheries Abstracts, BIOSIS Previews, Current Contents/Agriculture, Biology & Environmental Sciences, the Science Citation Index, Scopus. According to the Journal Citation Reports, the journal has a 2021 impact factor of 6.28.

== Types of papers ==
The journal publishes the following types of papers:

- Standard Research Papers - a typical experimental, comparative or theoretical paper
- Reviews - syntheses of topics of broad ecological interest
- Perspectives - short articles presenting new ideas (without data) intended to stimulate scientific debate
- Special Features - a collection of manuscripts, typically Reviews or Perspectives, on a single theme

The journal also produces podcasts on a semi-regular basis, usually focusing on a recent article and has a blog, which includes interviews with authors and articles relating to the ecological academic and research community.
