= Journal of Ecology =

Peer-reviewed scientific journal

- Discipline: Plant ecology
- Language: English
- Edited by: David Gibson

Publication details
- History: 1913–present
- Publisher: Wiley-Blackwell on behalf of the British Ecological Society (United Kingdom)
- Frequency: Bimonthly
- Open access: Delayed, after 2 years
- Impact factor: 5.762 (2019)

Standard abbreviations
- ISO 4: J. Ecol.

Indexing
- ISSN: 0022-0477 (print); 1365-2745 (web)
- LCCN: sn99-23371
- JSTOR: 00220477
- OCLC no.: 40892763

Links
- Journal homepage; Online access; Online archive

The Journal of Ecology is a bimonthly peer-reviewed scientific journal covering all aspects of the ecology of plants. It was established in 1913 and is published by Wiley-Blackwell on behalf of the British Ecological Society.

The journal publishes papers on plant ecology (including algae) in both terrestrial and aquatic ecosystems. In addition to population and community ecology, articles on biogeochemistry, ecosystems, microbial ecology, physiological plant ecology, climate change, molecular genetics, mycorrhizal ecology, and the interactions between plants and organisms such as animals or bacteria, are published regularly. Besides primary research articles, it publishes "Essay Reviews" and "Forum" articles. In 2008, the first papers in a new series called "Future Directions" were published. These short papers are intended to stimulate debate as to where a field within plant ecology is going, or needs to go.

In addition, the journal contains a long-running series on the "Biological Flora of the British Isles". Over 300 accounts (each of a different species) have been published so far, all of which, from 1998 onwards, can be accessed free of charge via the journal's website. The site also has a list of the species covered.

In celebration of the journal's 100th anniversary, a Centenary Symposium was held during the British Ecological Society's Annual Meeting in Sheffield (United Kingdom) in September 2011. A group of researchers were invited to talk on topics in which the journal has published major contributions over the last century and in which significant progress is currently being made. The contributors to the Centenary Symposium produced written versions of their papers for publication in the journal's Centenary Special Issue.

According to the Journal Citation Reports, the journal has an impact factor of 6.43 as of 2021.
