= List of botanical gardens and arboretums in New York =

This list of botanical gardens and arboretums in New York is intended to include all significant botanical gardens and arboretums in the U.S. state of New York.

Name	Image	Affiliation	City	Coordinates
Bailey Arboretum			Locust Valley	40°53′12″N 73°35′01″W
Bard College Arboretum		Bard College	Annandale-on-Hudson	42°01′45″N 73°54′22″W
Bayard Cutting Arboretum State Park			Great River	40°44′9.1″N 73°09′44.5″W
Brooklyn Botanic Garden			New York City (Brooklyn)	40°40′7.32″N 73°57′52.92″W
Buffalo and Erie County Botanical Gardens			Buffalo	42°49′41″N 78°49′33″W
Mary Flagler Cary Arboretum			Millbrook	41°47′6.72″N 73°44′0.96″W
Clark Botanic Garden			Albertson	40°46′19.92″N 73°38′23.28″W
Cornell Botanic Gardens		Cornell University	Ithaca	42°26′58″N 76°28′20″W
Cutler Botanic Garden			Binghamton	42°06′08″N 75°54′42″W
Ellwanger Garden			Rochester	43°8′15.72″N 77°36′54.36″W
Genesee Country Village and Museum			Mumford	42°59′33.59″N 77°52′48.43″W
Highland Botanical Park			Rochester	43°7′47″N 77°36′23″W
Hofstra University Arboretum		Hofstra University	Hempstead	40°42′43.8″N 73°35′58.3″W
Maud Gordon Holmes Arboretum		Buffalo State University	Buffalo	42°56′4.92″N 78°53′2.04″W
John P. Humes Japanese Stroll Garden			Mill Neck	40°52′28.7″N 73°34′29.6″W
Innisfree Garden			Millbrook	41°45′37.27″N 73°44′49.54″W
George Landis Arboretum			Esperance	42°47′05″N 74°16′13″W
Lasdon Park and Arboretum			Somers	41°16′33.1″N 73°44′4.46″W
Mountain Top Arboretum			Tannersville	42°13′21.2″N 74°08′01.2″W
Nannen Arboretum			Ellicottville	42°16′59″N 78°40′15″W
New York Botanical Garden			New York City (The Bronx)	40°51′49″N 73°52′42″W
F.R. Newman Arboretum		Cornell University	Ithaca	42°26′58″N 76°28′20″W
Planting Fields Arboretum			Oyster Bay	40°51′39″N 73°33′26″W
Queens Botanical Garden			New York City (Flushing)	40°45′1.44″N 73°49′43.68″W
Sonnenberg Gardens			Canandaigua	42°54′0″N 77°16′21″W
Staten Island Botanical Garden			New York City (Staten Island)	40°38′33″N 74°6′10″W
University of Rochester Arboretum		University of Rochester	Rochester	43°07′42″N 77°37′42″W
Vassar College Arboretum		Vassar College	Poughkeepsie	41°41′15″N 73°53′45″W
Wave Hill			New York City (The Bronx)	40°53′55″N 73°54′47″W

== See also ==
- List of botanical gardens and arboretums in the United States
- Trees of New York City
