= Gene Likens =

American ecologist

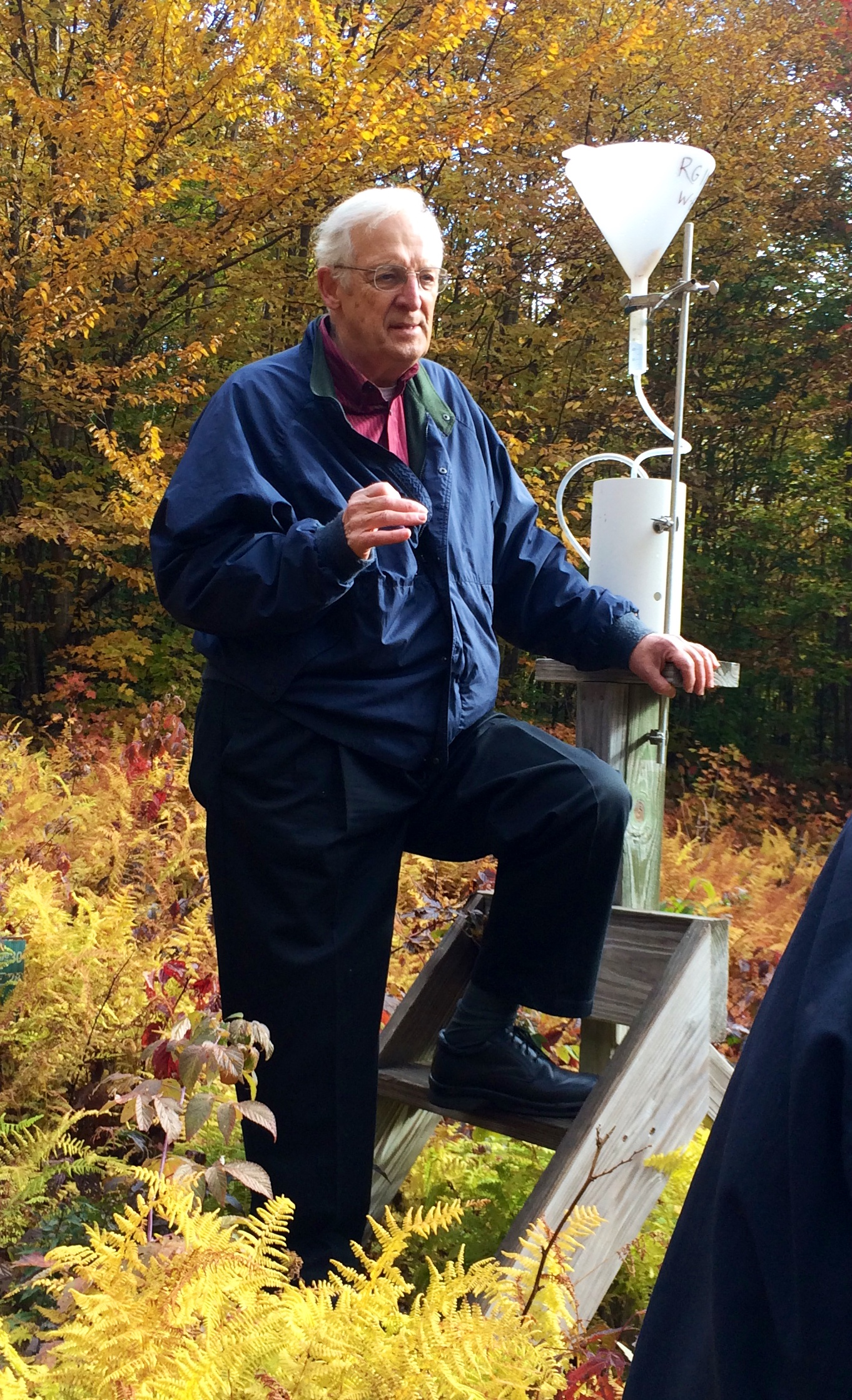
- Gene Likens, 2015
- Born: Gene Elden Likens; January 6, 1935 (age 91); Pierceton, Indiana, US
- Education: Manchester University; University of Wisconsin–Madison
- Known for: Hubbard Brook Experimental Forest; Institute of Ecosystem Studies
- Spouse: Phyllis Irene Craig Likens (1983–2014)
- Awards: Royal Swedish Academy of Sciences, Royal Danish Academy of Sciences and Letters, Austrian Academy of Sciences, National Medal of Science, BBVA Foundation Frontiers of Knowledge Award
- Scientific career
- Fields: Ecology
- Workplaces: Dartmouth College, Cornell University, University of Connecticut, University of Uppsala

Gene Elden Likens (born January 6, 1935) is an American limnologist and ecologist. He co-founded the Hubbard Brook Ecosystem Study at the Hubbard Brook Experimental Forest in 1963, and founded the Cary Institute of Ecosystem Studies in Millbrook, New York in 1983.

A leading pioneer in long-term multidisciplinary ecological studies, Likens examines energy flow and biogeochemical flux models in the ecosystems of forests, streams and lakes. Likens is best known for leading the team of scientists that discovered acid rain in North America, and connected fossil fuels with increasing acidity of precipitation. In addition to its scientific impact, this work has influenced public debate and governmental policy, particularly the United States Congress's Clean Air Act Amendments of 1990.

== Education ==
Gene Likens was born in Pierceton, Indiana. Likens received his B.S. in zoology at Manchester University (North Manchester, Indiana) in 1957, followed by his M.S. in zoology in 1959 from the University of Wisconsin–Madison. He received his Ph.D. in zoology in 1962, also from the University of Wisconsin–Madison, for his thesis on Transport of radioisotopes in lakes.

== Career ==
=== Dartmouth College ===
Likens was an instructor and associate professor at Dartmouth College from 1963 to 1969. In the 1960s, Likens did early work in the dry valleys of Antarctica, examining the thermal structures of Lake Vanda and Lake Bonney.

=== Hubbard Brook Experimental Forest ===
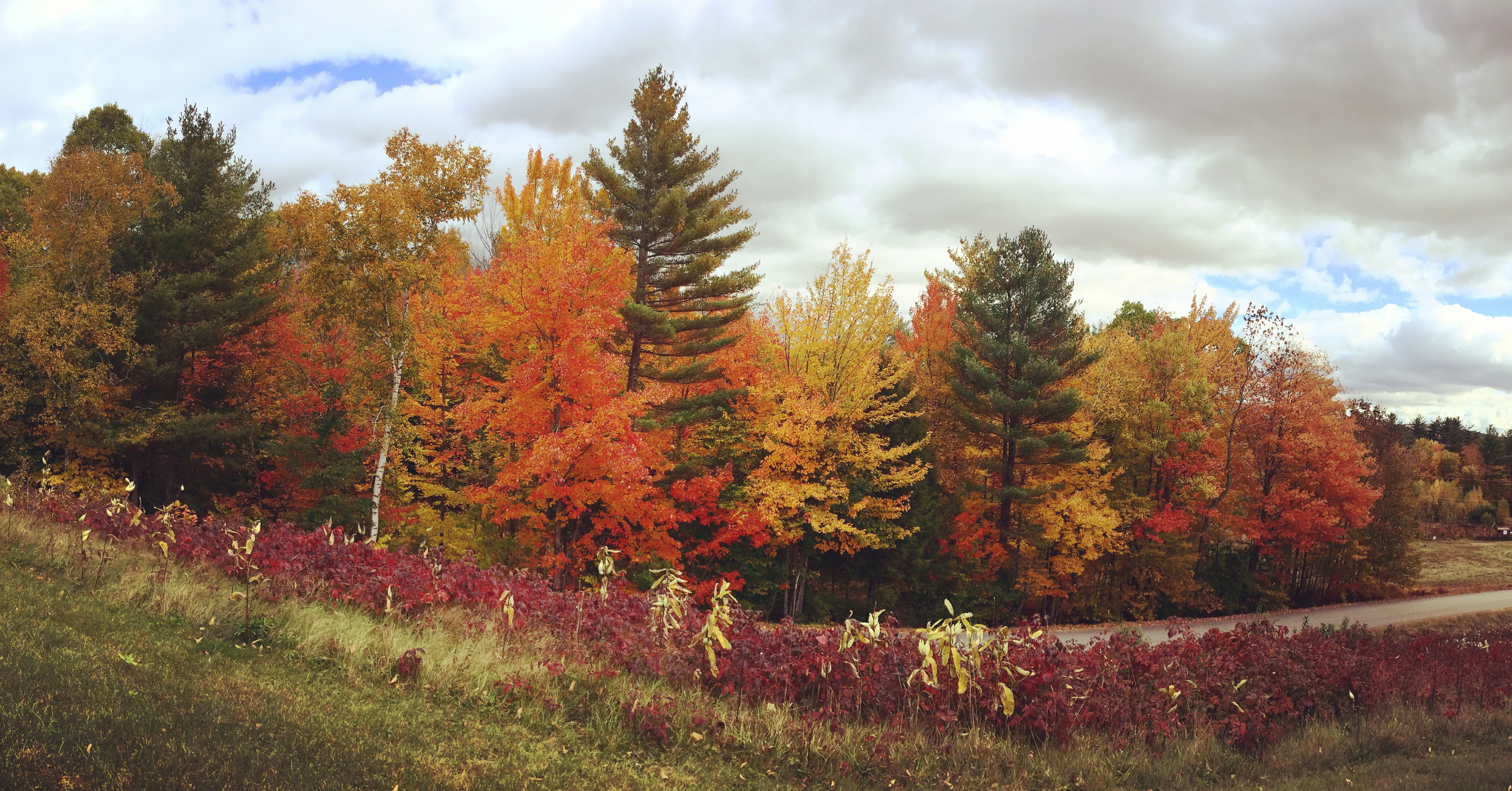
Hubbard Brook Experimental Forest, 2015

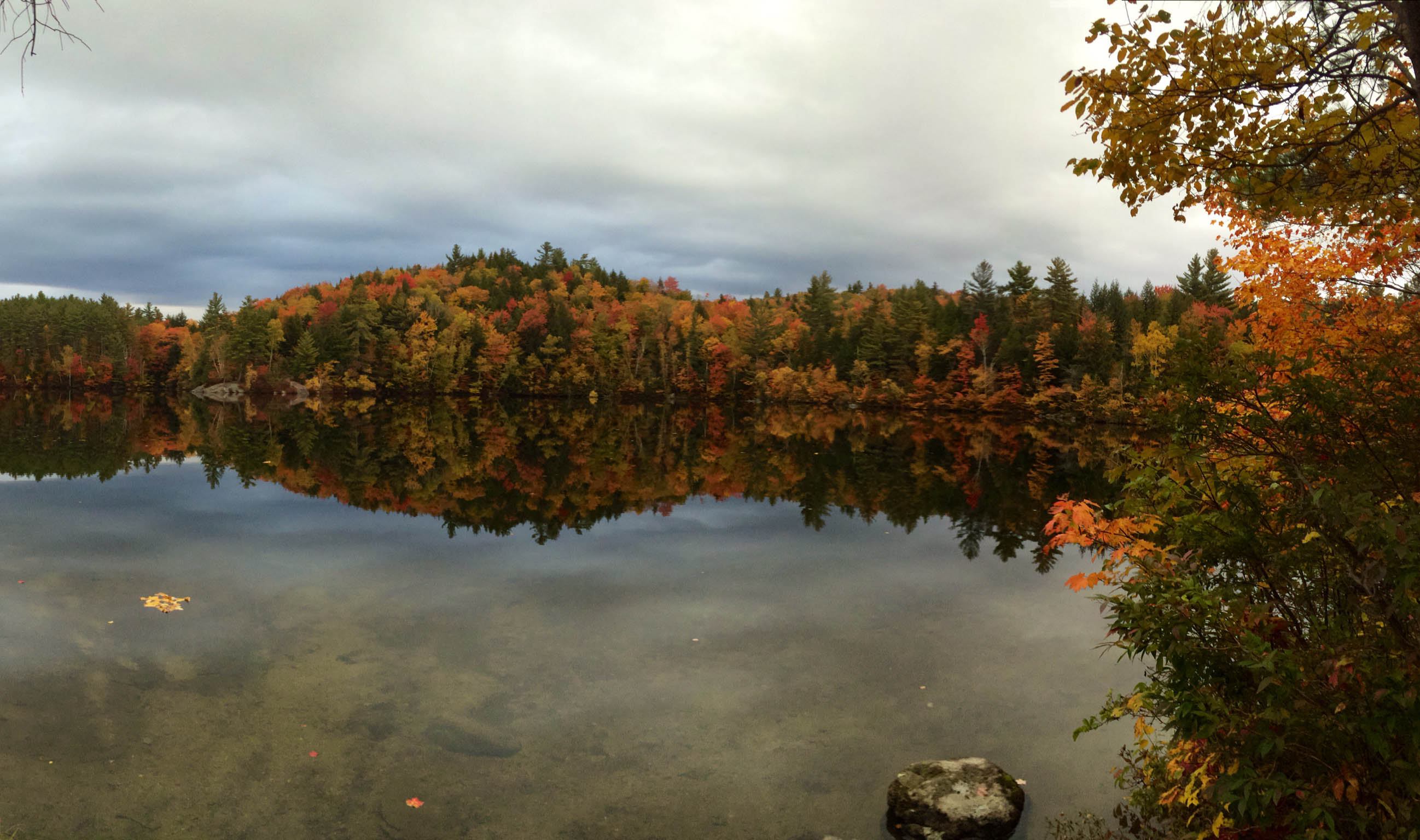
Mirror Lake, 2015

Likens was co-founder in 1963 of a group with F. Herbert Bormann, Robert S. Pierce and Noye M. Johnson working on the Hubbard Brook Ecosystem Study at the Hubbard Brook Experimental Forest in the White Mountains of New Hampshire. The study immediately found that the rain was abnormally acidic, and the group carried out one of the first scientific studies linking acid rain to air pollution such as sulphur dioxide from the use of fossil fuels.

In 1988, Hubbard Brook was designated by the National Science Foundation as an LTER, a site for collaborative long term ecological research. In 2005, Hubbard Brook celebrated 50 years of research at the site. Likens' work in the area is considered "one of the world’s most comprehensive studies on how air pollution and land use shape forested watersheds". Work at Mirror Lake, at the lower end of the Hubbard Brook Valley, has been particularly important in understanding the importance of physical, chemical, and biological linkages involving the lake and its watershed and airshed. Liken has extensively studied biogeochemical cycles describing the flow of matter within ecosystems. Riparian zones linking water and land are particularly important in maintaining the health of wild lands. Liken has also done important work on deforestation and its potential impact on the chemistry of watersheds. This research has had significant impacts on programs for forest management, in particular the United States Forest Service's adoption of a 100–year rotation policy.

Likens and others devised a range of highly influential long-term experiments on an ecosystemic scale. These include the small-watershed model of nutrient cycling, in which all water entering and leaving a naturally-bounded watershed is measured, enabling scientists to calculate the hydrologic budget of the watershed. This model has been "extremely influential" in the examination of ecosystems, and is central to the examination of urban ecosystems such as Baltimore. Likens' work is considered "classic", and he is credited with establishing a "guiding paradigm" for other ecologists.

=== Cornell University ===
In 1969, Likens joined the faculty of Cornell University. He served as an associate professor from 1969 to 1972, and as a full professor from 1972 to 1983. In addition to being a professor of ecology in the Section of Ecology and Systematics (later named the Department of Ecology & Evolutionary Biology), he served as its acting chairman (1973-1974) and chairman (1982-1983). In January 1983 he was named Cornell University's Charles A. Alexander Professor of Biological Sciences. While at Cornell University, he served as chairman of the Section of Ecology and Systematics.

=== Institute of Ecosystem Studies ===
External media
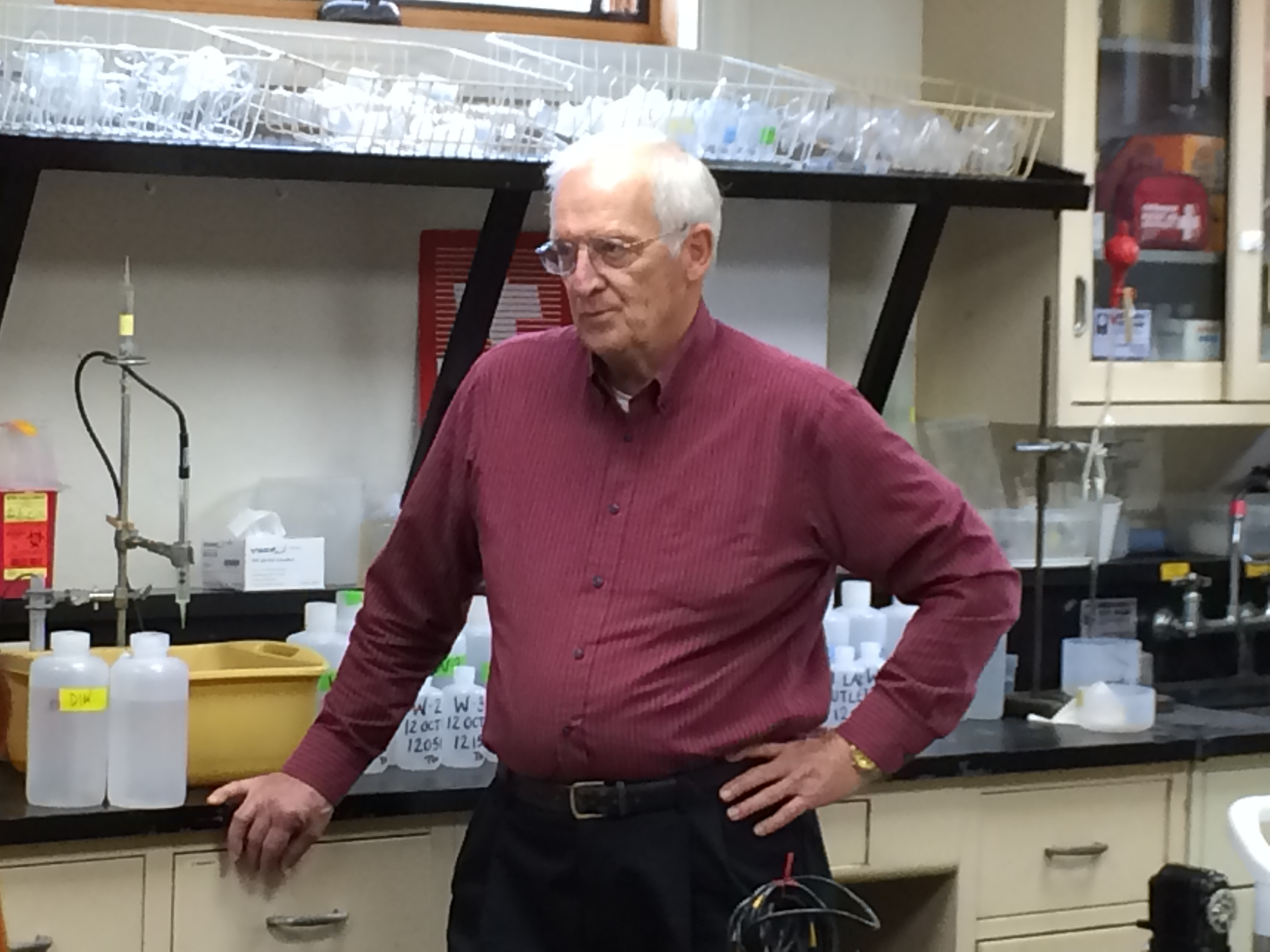

Audio
- “Whatever Happened to Acid Rain?“, Science History Institute

Video
- “2000 Interview with Gene Likens, Institute of Ecosystems Studies“
- “Acid Rain: A Long, Unfinished Journey From Discovery to Political Action. Dr. Gene Likens“, Cary Institute of Ecosystem Studies
- "Gene E. Likens, Cary Institute of Ecosystem Studies"

In 1983 Likens founded the (now Cary) Institute of Ecosystem Studies in Millbrook, New York as part of the New York Botanical Garden. In 1993, the IES became an independent non-profit with Likens as director and president. Situated at the Mary Flagler Cary Arboretum, it is an independent center for ecological research, "whose work is highly relevant to policy concerns." In addition to managing teams of scientists and educators, Likens continued his research at Hubbard Brook each summer. As of 2001, he was appointed to the first endowed chair at the Institute of Ecosystem Studies, the G. Evelyn Hutchinson Chair in Ecology.

In 2007 Likens stepped down as director of the IES and returned to full-time research, currently at the University of Connecticut and as visiting professor at the University of Uppsala, Sweden. In July 2012 he began a three-year term as special adviser to the president of the University of Connecticut on environmental affairs and distinguished research professor.

Likens has published 25 books and more than 580 papers and book chapters. Much of his early work is summarized in U.S. Geological Survey publications. His work has influenced the United States Congress on issues such as the Clean Air Act Amendments of 1990.

Likens has been active in a variety of organizations, and has been the vice-president (1975-1976) and president (1976-1977) of the American Society of Limnology and Oceanography; vice-president (1978-1979), president (1981-1982) and honorary Fellow (2012) of the Ecological Society of America; president (2002) of the American Institute of Biological Sciences; and president (2001-2007) of the International Society of Limnology.

== Awards and honors ==
Likens has received a substantial number of awards and honors of various kinds. He was elected to the American Academy of Arts and Sciences in 1979, and the United States National Academy of Sciences in 1981. He was also elected as a foreign member of the Royal Swedish Academy of Sciences in 1988, the Royal Danish Academy of Sciences and Letters in 1994 and the Austrian Academy of Sciences in 2000. He became an elected member in biological sciences of the American Philosophical Society in 2006. He's also a fellow of the American Association for the Advancement of Science.

Likens' awards include the 1988 ECI Prize in Limnetic Ecology, the 1993 Tyler Prize for Environmental Achievement and the 2001 Huxley Medal of the Institute of Biology, London, UK. He received a 2001 National Medal of Science from President George W. Bush on June 13, 2002. In 2003, Likens and Dr. F. Herbert Bormann received the Blue Planet Prize from Asahi Glass Foundation, for "outstanding scientific research that helps to solve global environmental problems". In 2014, he received the Alfred C. Redfield Lifetime Achievement Award from the Association for the Sciences of Limnology and Oceanography (ASLO).

Likens has been awarded honorary doctoral degrees internationally (Universität für Bodenkultur, Vienna, 1992; Wageningen Agricultural University, The Netherlands, 1998) as well as nationally (Manchester College, 1979; Rutgers University, 1985; Plymouth State College, University System of New Hampshire, 1989; Miami University, 1990; Union College, 1991; Marist College, 1993; University of Connecticut, 2004; Montclair State University, 2012).

Likens has won the BBVA Foundation Frontiers of Knowledge Award (2016) jointly with Marten Scheffer for contributing decisively to what the jury describes as “one of the major challenges” of this scientific discipline: to understand and, where possible, anticipate ecosystem responses to human-induced alterations of the natural environment.

In 2018 Likens was awarded an honorary doctorate from Uppsala University, Sweden.

== Family ==
Gene Likens and his wife Phyllis Irene Craig Likens (1951–2014) had four children. Phyllis also worked at Cornell University and the Institute of Ecosystem Studies and contributed significantly to the Hubbard Brook Ecosystem Study.
