= Taroh Matsuno =

Japanese meteorologist

Tarō Matsuno
- 松野 太郎
- Born: October 17, 1934 (age 91); Nagano, Nagano, Empire of Japan
- Occupation: Meteorologist
- Awards: Japan Academy Prize; Carl-Gustaf Rossby Research Medal; International Meteorological Organization Prize; Blue Planet Prize

Academic background
- Education: The University of Tokyo

Academic work
- Institutions: Japan Agency for Marine-Earth Science and Technology; Hokkaido University; The University of Tokyo

Tarō Matsuno (born October 17, 1934) is a Japanese meteorologist and Professor Emeritus at the University of Tokyo and Hokkaido University.

He is the winner of the 55th IMO prize, the most prestigious award of the World Meteorological Organization.

He is the winner of the 2013 Blue Planet Prize with Daniel Sperling.

Matsuno showed that Kelvin waves should also exist at the equator
