= Lester Collins =

Lester Collins may refer to:

- Lester Collins (landscape architect) (1914–1993), American landscape architect
- Shad Collins (1910–1978), American jazz trumpet player
