= Cary Institute of Ecosystem Studies =

Non-profit organisation in the US

Cary Institute of Ecosystem Studies (Cary Institute), formerly known as the Institute of Ecosystem Studies, is an independent, nonprofit environmental research organization dedicated to the scientific study of the world's ecosystems and the natural and human factors that influence them. The organization is headquartered in Millbrook, New York, on a 2,000-acre (810 ha) research campus. Areas of expertise include disease ecology, urban ecology, freshwater ecology and provisioning, and forest health.

== Details ==
Cary Institute's research is collaborative and multidisciplinary. Its scientists have led two of the National Science Foundation's Long Term Ecological Research Network sites: the Baltimore Ecosystem Study (Baltimore, MD; focus: urban ecology) and the Hubbard Brook Ecosystem Study (Woodstock, NH; focus: forest and freshwater health). They also play a leadership role in the Global Lake Ecological Observatory Network, an international effort that shares and interprets high resolution sensor data to understand, predict, and communicate the role and response of lakes in a changing global environment.

While working at Hubbard Brook Experimental Forest in the 1960s, Cary Institute founder Gene E. Likens co-discovered acid rain in North America. His longterm studies on precipitation and stream water chemistry were instrumental in shaping the 1990 Clean Air Act amendments. Today, Cary Institute continues to steward the longest continuous data set on acid rain and deposition through its direction of the Hubbard Brook Ecosystem Study.

Cary Institute's grounds have been home to long-term studies on the ecology of tick-borne disease for more nearly 30 years. Findings underpinned The Tick Project, a 5-year study that tested interventions with the potential to reduce Lyme disease and protect public health. A four-decade research program on the Hudson River informs sustainable shoreline management, and a synthesis of imported forest pests and pathogens is the basis for Tree-SMART Trade, a national policy initiative aimed at closing the door on imported forest pests.

Cary Institute scientists advise decision makers, from providing Congressional testimony to serving as members of the National Climate Assessment, the United States Environmental Protection Agency’s Scientific Advisory Board, the White House National Science and Technology Council’s Epidemic Prediction Working Group, and the Intergovernmental Panel on Climate Change.

Staff includes a total of about 110 employees, including 25 Ph.D. scientists, as well as adjuncts and affiliates working around the world in places like Argentina, Brazil, China, Chile, Germany, Kenya, Singapore, and South Africa. Institute scientists have peer recognition including five Members of the National Academy of Sciences, four Members of the American Academy of Arts and Sciences, nine Fellows of the American Association for the Advancement of Science, and eight Fellows of the Ecological Society of America.

While Cary Institute is not itself a degree-granting institution, numerous graduate students are trained under the mentorship of the scientific staff, who have adjunct appointments at colleges and universities throughout the world, including Yale, Cornell, Columbia, and Bard.

Organized as a 501(c)(3) corporation, Cary Institute receives financial support from multiple sources that include research and education grants from federal and state sources (e.g., the National Science Foundation, United States Environmental Protection Agency, and the National Institutes of Health), private foundations, and private donors.

== See also ==
- Gene Likens
- William H. Schlesinger
- Mary Flagler Cary Arboretum
