= William H. Schlesinger =

American biogeochemist

William H. Schlesinger (born April 30, 1950) is a biogeochemist and the retired president of the Cary Institute of Ecosystem Studies, an independent not-for-profit environmental research organization in Millbrook, New York. He assumed that position after 27 years on the faculty of Duke University, where he served as the Dean of the Nicholas School of the Environment and Earth Sciences and James B. Duke Professor of Biogeochemistry.

== Education and career ==
Schlesinger began his college education at Dartmouth College where he received his A.B. in biology in 1972. He earned his Ph.D. at Cornell University in Ecology and Systematics in 1976.

Schlesinger’s teaching career began at the University of California, Santa Barbara where he was an assistant professor of biology for four years. Afterwards, he moved to Duke University, becoming a full professor and teaching for over 20 years. In 2001, Schlesinger was promoted as the Dean of the Nicholas School of the Environment and Earth Sciences at Duke University. Schlesinger retired as the dean on June 1, 2007, when he became the president of the Cary Institute of Ecosystem Studies.

== Awards and honors ==
Schlesinger was elected a member of the National Academy of Sciences in 2003 and was President of the Ecological Society of America from 2003 to 2004. He received the eminent ecologist award from the Ecological Society of America in 2025. He is also a fellow of the American Academy of Arts and Sciences, the American Geophysical Union, The American Association for the Advancement of Science (AAAS), The Ecological Society of America, and the Soil Science Society of America. He is a member of the Board of Trustees of the Southern Environmental Law Center, and a past member of the Board of the Natural Resources Defense Council (NRDC) and the Doris Duke Charitable Foundation. He also served on the Science Advisory Board (SAB) for the Environmental Protection Agency (EPA), where he focused on the Agency's recommendations for phosphorus loading in Lake Erie and for the potential for biomass energy to reduce carbon dioxide emissions to the atmosphere. Under the Trump administration, he was not reappointed to the SAB in 2018.

== Contributions to biogeochemistry ==
Schlesinger has a long research career studying the circulation of the chemical elements in natural ecosystems—now widely known as biogeochemistry. Most of his work has focused on soils, especially on the carbon stored in soils, which contain a major pool in the global carbon cycle. His early work provided estimates of the storage of organic carbon (humus) and inorganic carbon (largely calcium carbonate) in soils, losses of soil carbon to runoff, changes in soil carbon with conversion of land to agriculture, and accumulations of carbon during soil development. More recently, he has examined changes in soil processes and soil carbon storage that accompany plant growth at elevated levels of atmospheric carbon dioxide, as simulated in the Duke Forest Free-Air CO_{2} Enrichment (FACE) experiment. His work also evaluates recommendations for carbon sequestration as a means to control the accumulation of CO_{2} in Earth’s atmosphere and to mitigate the potential for global warming.

In addition to studies of soil carbon, Schlesinger has provided global budgets summarizing the sources of atmospheric ammonia, the fate of human-derived nitrogen on land, and the global cycles of arsenic, boron, fluorine, lithium, and vanadium. He has shown that biology leaves its imprint on global geochemical cycles, and that earth system function cannot be fully understood without considering the effects of biology. His approach, philosophy, and much of his other work is summarized in a textbook, Biogeochemistry: an analysis of global change in its fourth edition and coauthored with Emily S. Bernhardt of Duke University, available through Academic Press/Elsevier, San Diego.

== Work with desert ecosystems, 1991-2006 ==
Schlesinger served as the co-principal investigator for the Jornada Basin Long Term Ecological Research (LTER) located in the Chihuahuan Desert in southern New Mexico. He has also worked extensively in arid ecosystems and landscapes, studying responses to resource redistribution and global change, which can lead to soil degradation and regional desertification. Schlesinger postulated that the patchy distribution of vegetation in desert regions controls many aspects of soil fertility and the response of deserts to overgrazing and climate change.

== Forest-atmosphere carbon transfer and storage, 1996-1999 ==
Schlesinger was the co-principal investigator for the Free Air CO_{2} Enrichment (FACE) Experiment in the Duke Forest. The object of the study was to investigate the efficacy of carbon sequestration in forest ecosystems (vegetation and soil) in response to elevated atmospheric CO_{2} concentration, as a means to mitigate the potential for global warming.

During this decade-long experiment, Schlesinger and John Lichter (Bowdoin College) found only small changes in soil carbon content, suggesting that enhanced carbon storage in soils is unlikely to play a major role in slowing the growth of atmospheric CO_{2} and the magnitude of global climate change. Much larger changes were seen in the growth rate of trees, but even those were unlikely to sequester a significant increment of carbon worldwide as a result of rising CO_{2} in Earth’s atmosphere.

== Scientific outreach ==
Schlesinger has testified before U.S. House and Senate Committees on the importance of habitat preservation and the effects of air pollution and climate change on humans and the natural environment. In addition to his 200+ scientific publications, he has authored more than 100 editorials and features on environmental subjects, appearing in the Los Angeles Times, the Chicago Tribune, the Albany Times Union, and the Raleigh News and Observer.

== Work at the Cary Institute of Ecosystem Studies, 2007-2014 ==
When he was appointed President of the Cary Institute in Millbrook, NY., Schlesinger expanded its existing science program with the hiring of three new scientists and establishing strong programs for the translation of science to the public. The Cary Institute’s Friday-Night-at-Cary Lecture series and its daily program, Earth Wise, on WAMC Northeast Public Radio were widely followed for their presentations of science for the general public.

== Personal life ==
Schlesinger was born and grew up in Cleveland, Ohio, where he attended University School. In 1988, he married Lisa Dellwo, a free-lance author, editor, and artist from Lynchburg, Virginia. They retired to Lubec, Maine in 2014, where they are engaged in documenting local natural history.
