= Innisfree Garden =

Public garden in Millbrook, New York, US

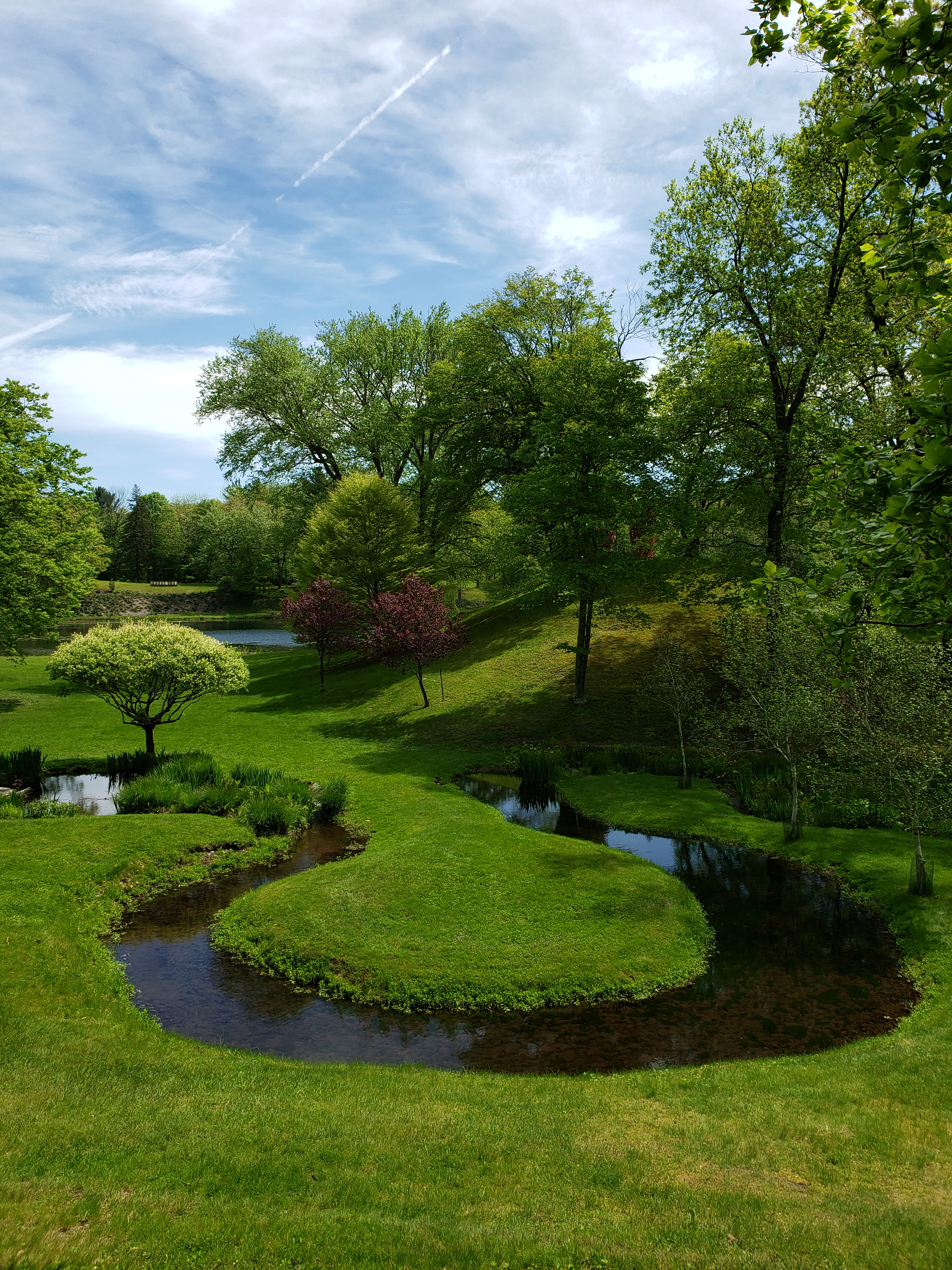
- View of a meandering creek
- Interactive map of Innisfree Garden
- Location: 362 Tyrrel Road; Millbrook, New York, U.S.
- Coordinates: 41°45′30″N 73°45′00″W
- Area: 150 acres (61 ha)
- Established: 1930; 96 years ago
- Website: innisfreegarden.org
- Innisfree Garden
- U.S. National Register of Historic Places
- Architect: Walter and Marion Beck; Lester Collins
- NRHP reference No.: 100004333
- Added to NRHP: September 3, 2019

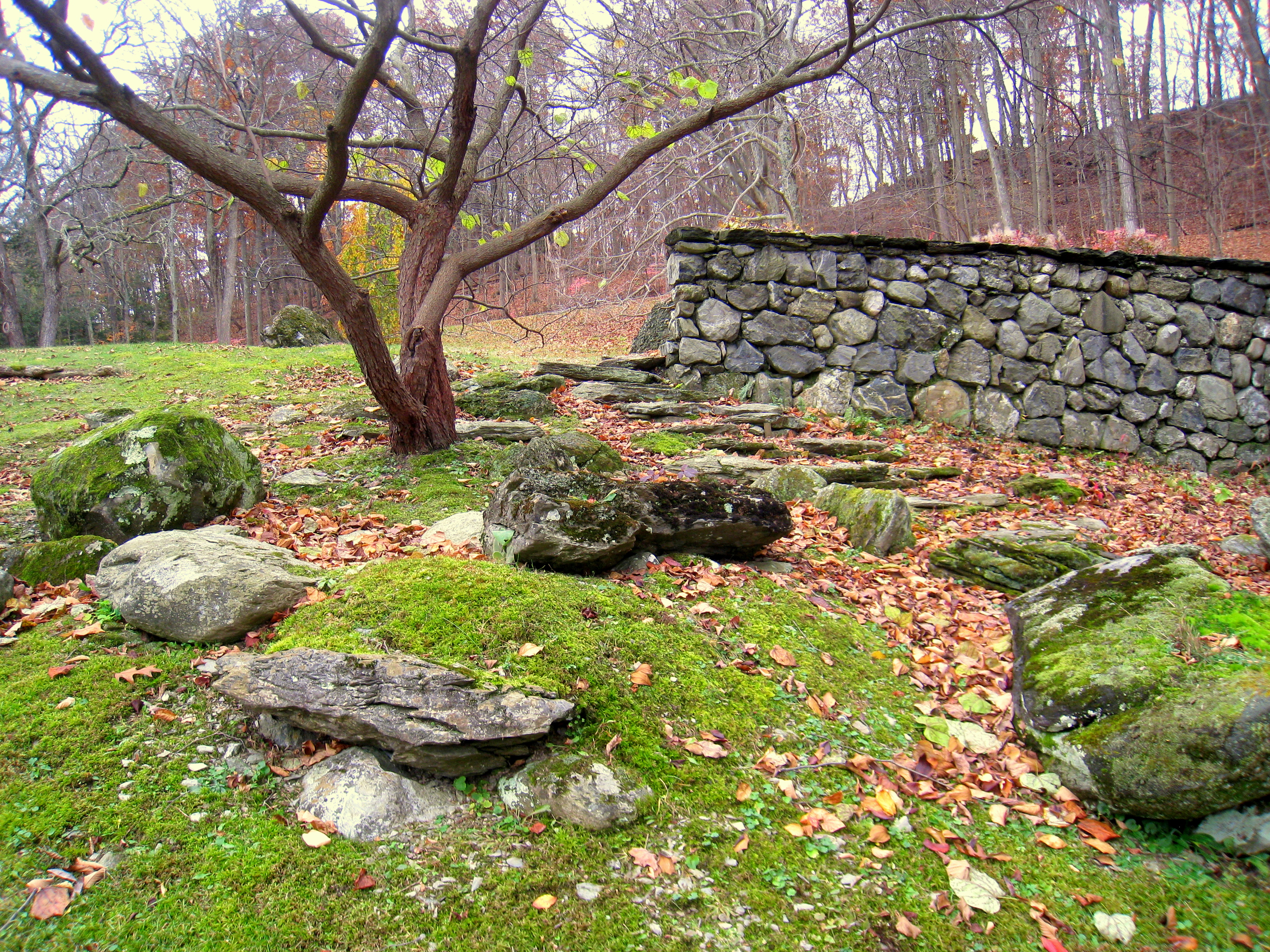
Detail with rocks and wall

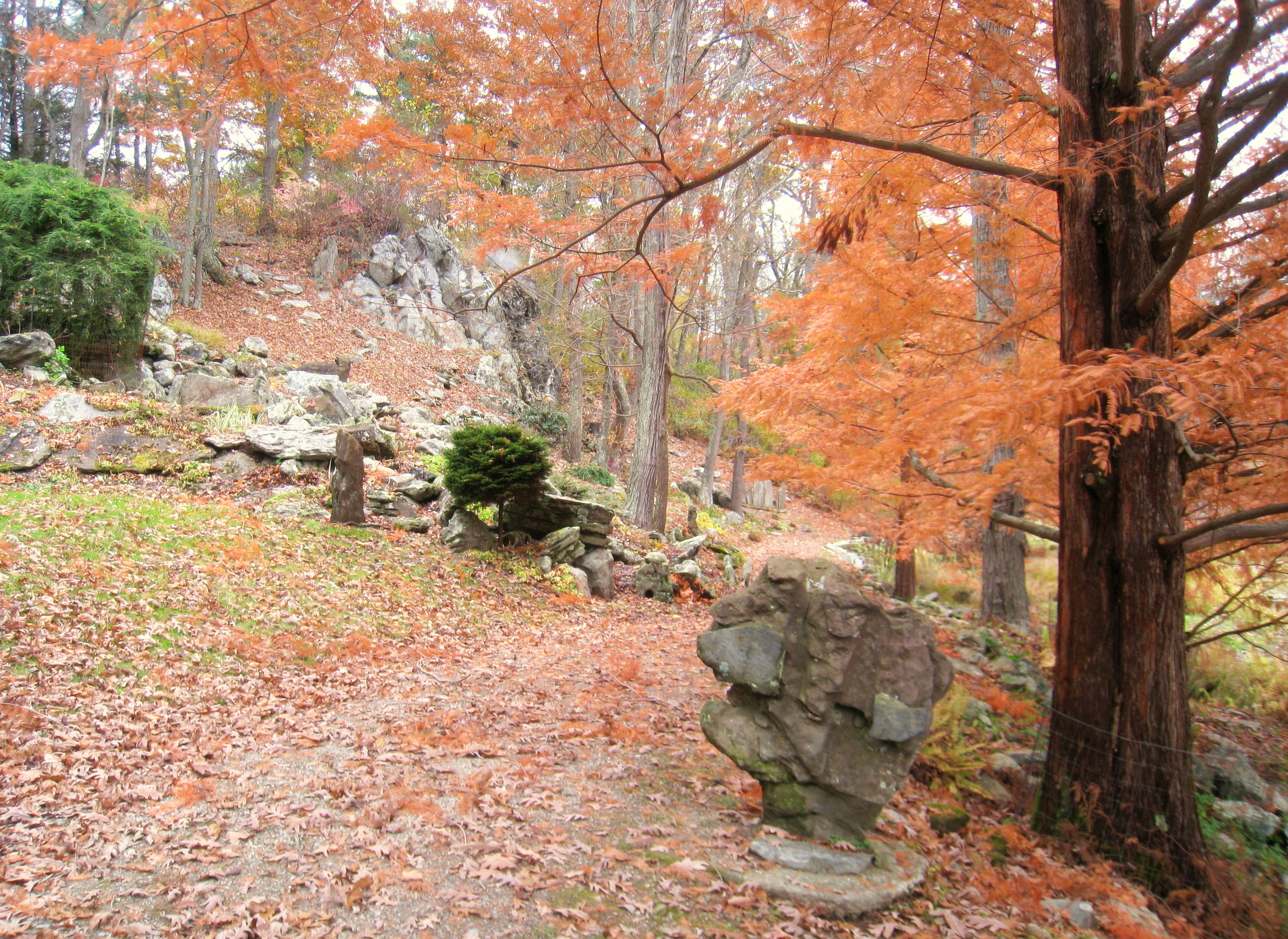
Scene in fall

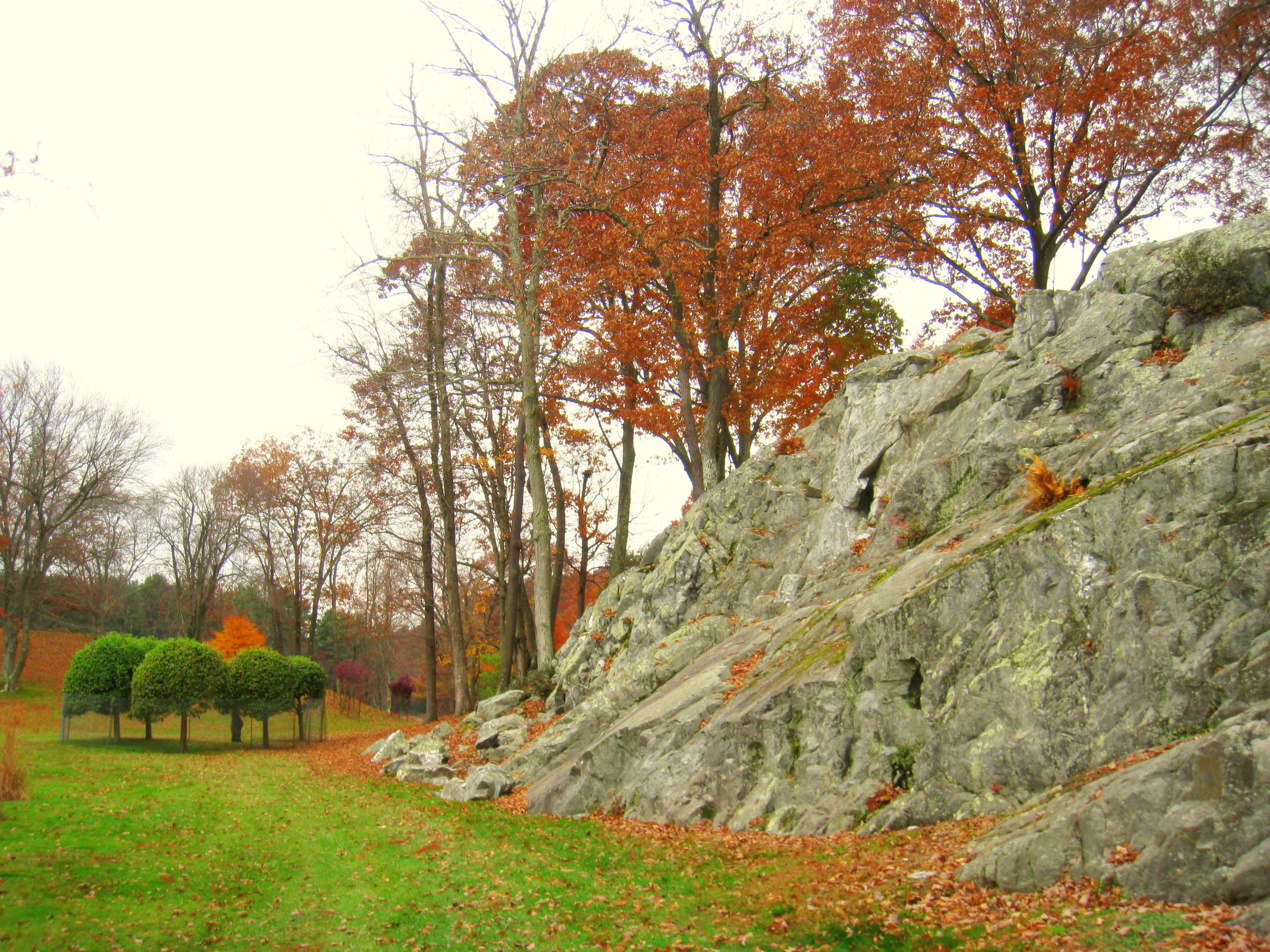
Rocks

Innisfree Garden is a Chinese style-influenced public garden in Millbrook, New York, United States. It was developed between 1930 and 1960 as the private garden of Walter and Marion Beck, inspired by scroll paintings of the 8th-century Chinese poet and painter Wang Wei. With the help of landscape architect Lester Collins from Harvard University, individual garden scenes inspired by the Chinese paintings were connected to an overall landscape around a glacial lake, in keeping with the ecological surroundings.

From 1960 onward, the garden was managed by a foundation headed by Collins, and open to the public. It was listed on the National Register of Historic Places in 2019.

== Origin ==
Innisfree Garden began as the private property of Walter Beck (1864–1954) and Marion Burt Beck (1876–1959), who married in 1922. He was a painter, the son of a German garden architect, and she was the daughter of Wellington R. Burt, a lumber baron from Saginaw, and inherited in 1919 the estate of 950 acres (384 hectares) and part of the family fortune. They commissioned a residence in 1930, designed by Robert Carrère and Norman Averill from New York. It was modeled after the manor house of Wisley, Surrey, UK, which was assembled in 1915 of remnants of older houses, and placed on a plateau overlooking the central Tyrrel Lake. The name Innisfree was taken from a poem by W. B. Yeats, "The Lake Isle of Innisfree".

The first design for a garden had stairs to the water and regular flower beds, in the style of the time of formal gardens around the house. Walter Beck was impressed by classical Chinese culture, especially by Wang Wei (王維) (698–761) who created scroll paintings and poems about gardens in the Wang-ch'uan cycle. Beck added numerous additional small gardens depicting individual scenes, called cup-gardens, using natural elements such as plants, rocks and streams for composed landscapes. Massive movement of hundreds of rocks was necessary for their creation. Streams and waterfalls were made possible by pumping water from the lake to a new reservoir above it.

From 1938, Walter Beck worked with the landscape architect Lester Collins (1914–1993) whom he had met while Collins was conducting his graduate studies at Harvard University. Collins later became Chair of Harvard's Landscape Architecture program and was responsible for the design of the National Zoological Park and the redesign of the Hirshhorn Sculpture Garden, among many other projects. At Innisfree, Collins created landscapes merging Romantic concepts with Chinese and Japanese garden design traditions which he studied in Japan. When Walter Beck died in 1954, his wife requested Collins to set up a foundation. He managed to link Beck's single scenes to a "landscape as a whole".

== Later history ==
When Marion Beck died in 1959, the management of the garden was transferred to the foundation. It was first directed by Collins, who faced financial difficulties. He dismissed most of the 20 gardeners, removed most of the cup-gardens, planted new trees and added rocks and fountains to enforce a romantic impression. The garden opened to the public in 1960. In 1969, a bridge across the lake was built, and a fog machine was installed to create artificial rainbows. Collins achieved his vision of a landscape around the glacial lake, to make it possible that "a sense of journey is part of the experience". Collins sold a large part of the property to the Rockefeller University in 1972, which created a nature preserve.

From 1980, Collins spent more time at Innisfree Garden, refining a "partnership with nature", knowing the influences of light and the seasons. He made lasting changes towards sustainability that have continued, for example letting more sunlight reach the ground letting native seeds sprout. He had the manor house demolished in 1982, arguing that it formed a contradiction to the new style of the garden. The house had become too costly to maintain, but without it, some of the garden architecture was left without focus.

When Collins died in 1993, his wife Petronella succeeded him, holding the position to 2017. In 2019, Innisfree Garden was listed on the National Register of Historic Places for "exceptional significance in landscape architecture".

In 2012, Innisfree Garden was listed as one of twelve unique American landscapes of national significance threatened to disappear. The Cultural Landscape Foundation said, "The cost of maintaining these site-specific gardens by landscape architect Lester Collins is slowly eating away at the Innisfree Foundation's endowment, and long-term financing could become an issue."

== Location and description ==
Innisfree Garden is located at 362 Tyrrel Road, Millbrook, New York. The 150-acre (61-hectare) garden features streams, waterfalls, terraces, retaining walls, rocks and plants based on principles of Chinese landscape design. Most of the plants are native, and rocks come from the local forest. Tyrrel Lake (40 acres (16 hectares)) is a large, deep glacial lake from which water is pumped into a hillside reservoir, and thence to the garden's water features.

== Visiting ==
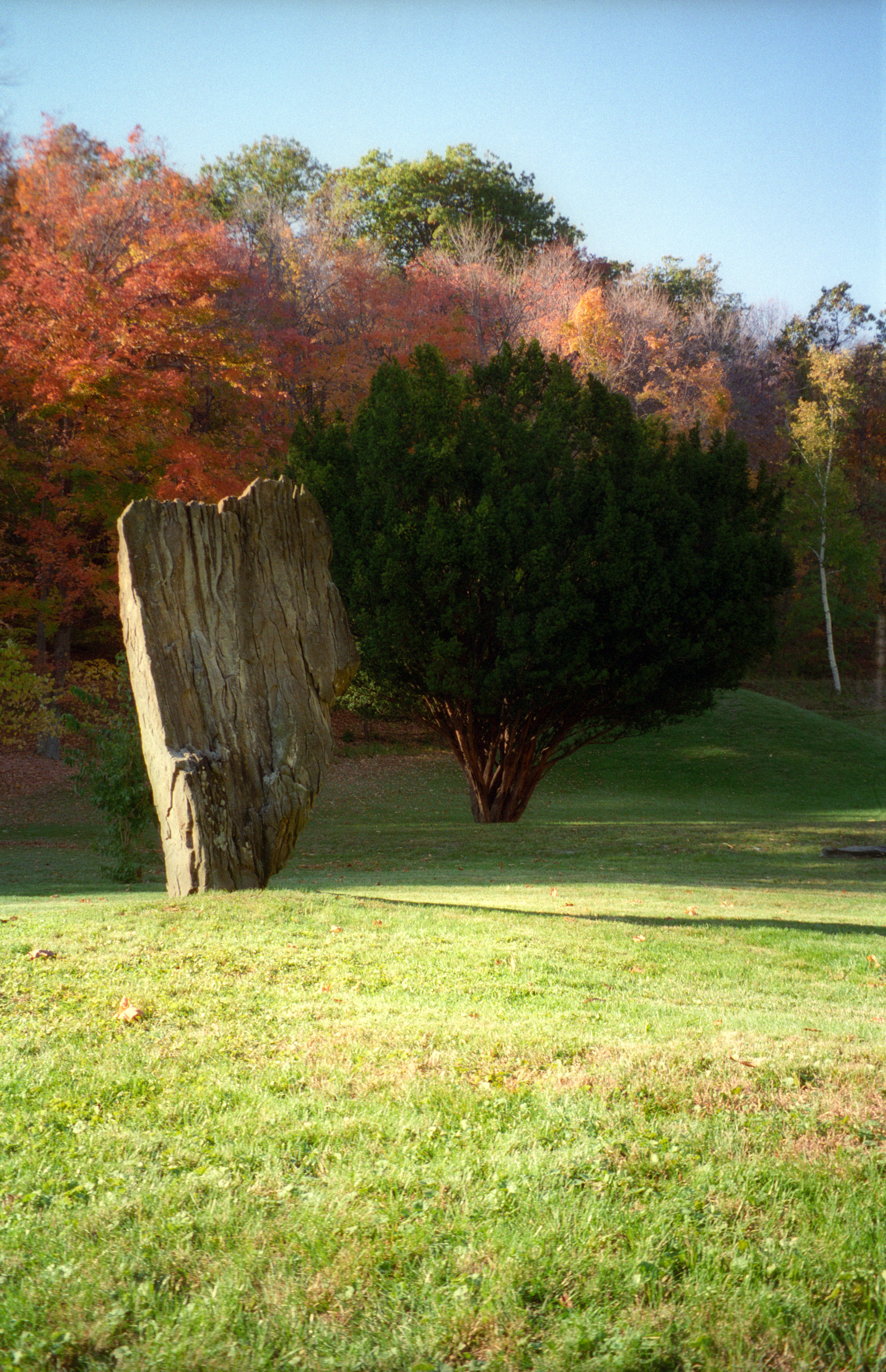
View of a rock, c. 1997

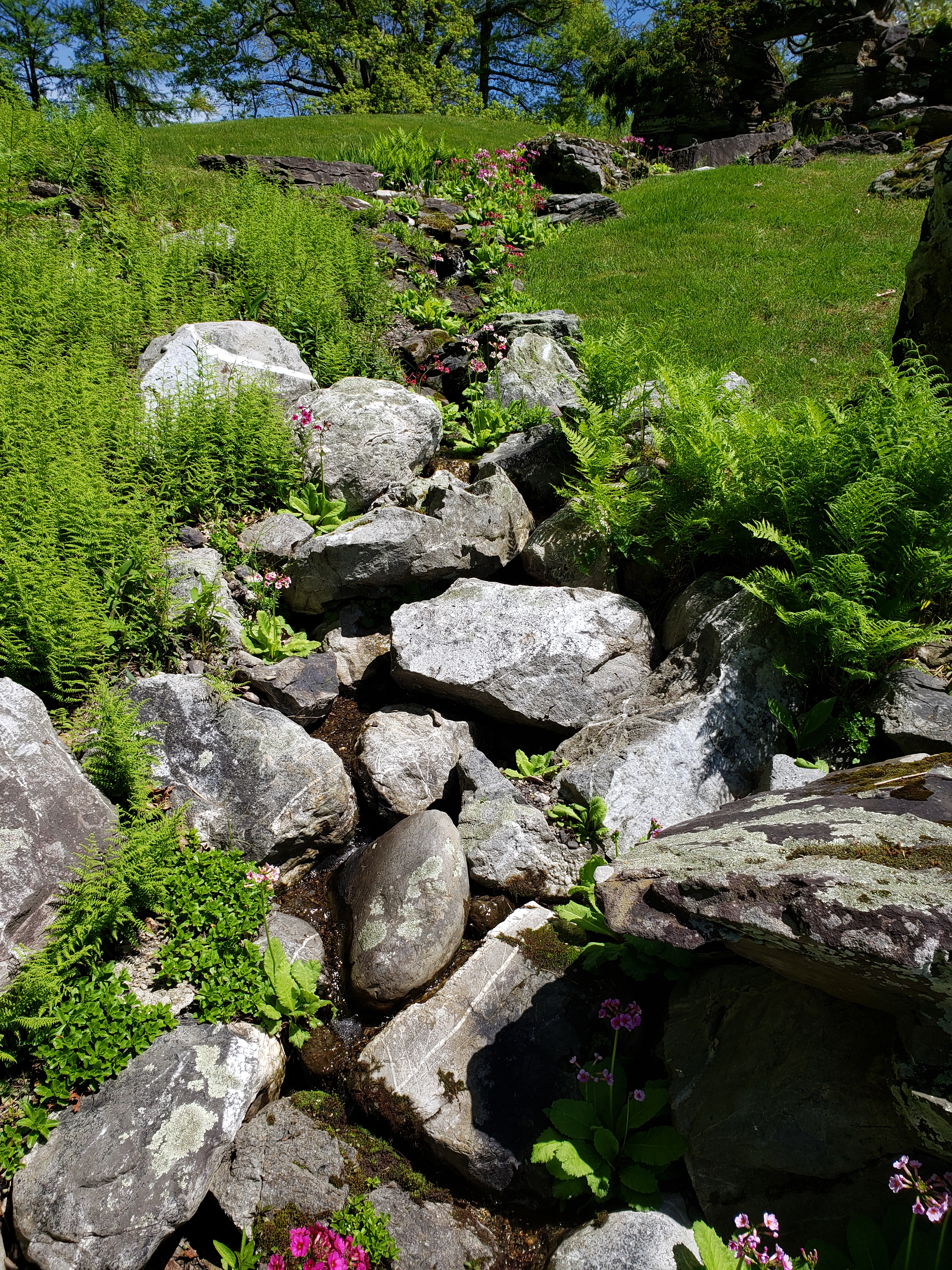
Detail, 2019

The garden is open Wednesday through Sunday, from May 7 to October 20; an admission fee is charged.

In 2020, the Garden planned to celebrate its 60th anniversary, but instead had to limit access due to the COVID-19 pandemic. It was kept open on a limited advanced-reservation basis. Kate Kerin, the garden's landscape curator, commented: "We believe that places like Innisfree, that feel peaceful and that connect people to nature and art, are needed now more than ever. We are part of the community and we're trying to answer that." Instead of hosting weekend viewings of daffodils planted before 1950, volunteers cut around 4,500 of them and delivered them to Vassar Brothers Medical Center and The Fountains, an assisted-living facility nearby.

== See also ==
- List of botanical gardens and arboretums in New York
- List of Chinese gardens
- National Register of Historic Places listings in Dutchess County, New York
