= Lester Collins (landscape architect) =

American landscape architect (1914–1993)

- Born: Lester Albertson Collins; 19 Apr 1914; Moorestown, New Jersey, U.S.
- Died: 7 Jul 1993 (aged 79); Sharon, Connecticut, U.S.
- Education: Princeton University; Harvard University
- Occupations: Landscape architect; Academic teacher
- Organizations: Harvard University; Environmental Planning and Design
- Known for: Hirshhorn Sculpture Garden; Innisfree Garden

Lester Albertson Collins (1914–1993) was an American landscape architect. He studied landscape architecture at Harvard, including studies of gardens in East Asia in 1940. After World War II, he began to teach as a professor at Harvard. Collins traveled to Japan in 1953 to work for a year on the translation of an ancient Japanese book. In 1954 he settled in Washington, D.C., and worked for the firm Simonds & Simonds in Pittsburgh. He worked on town plans, campus plans, and public gardens such as the Hirshhorn Sculpture Garden. Over 55 years, he developed and directed the Innisfree Garden in Millbrook, New York.

== Early life and education ==
Collins was born and grew up in New Jersey, the son of Lester Collins and Anna Mary Albertson. He majored in English at Princeton University, but transferred to Harvard where he majored in architecture, graduating in 1938. He then studied landscape architecture at Harvard, traveling in 1940 to East Asia with John Ormsbee Simonds, a fellow student. He finished a master's degree in 1942. During World War II, in 1942, he joined the American Field Service, placed in North Africa, and then served in the British Eighth Army. He married Petronella Le Roux of South Africa in 1947. She continued his work until she died in 2012.

== Career ==
After World War II, Collins began to teach as professor at Harvard and later became Dean of the landscape architecture department at the Harvard Graduate School of Design. On a Fulbright scholarship, Collins traveled to Japan in 1953 to work for a year with Fuku Ikawa on the translation into English of an ancient Japanese book about gardens, Sensai Hisho. With architect Walter Gropius, he created a "healing garden" for the new Michael Reese Hospital in Chicago.

Collins settled in Washington, D.C., in 1954. He joined the firm of Simonds & Simonds in Pittsburgh, Pennsylvania, in 1955 as their partner in Washington. Collins headed the firm's plan for Miami Lakes in the 1960s which pioneered a new kind of town planning in Florida. In 1970, the firm changed its name to Environmental Planning and Design.

Collins worked independently on projects in Washington, such as a new design for the Hirshhorn Sculpture Garden in 1977, the Enid A. Haupt Garden, the garden of the Kennedy Center, the Washington Zoo, and in Virginia Gunston Hall Plantation in Lorton. In collaboration with the National Park Service, he designed 29 parks along Pennsylvania Avenue. He worked on campus plans for Georgetown University and American University.

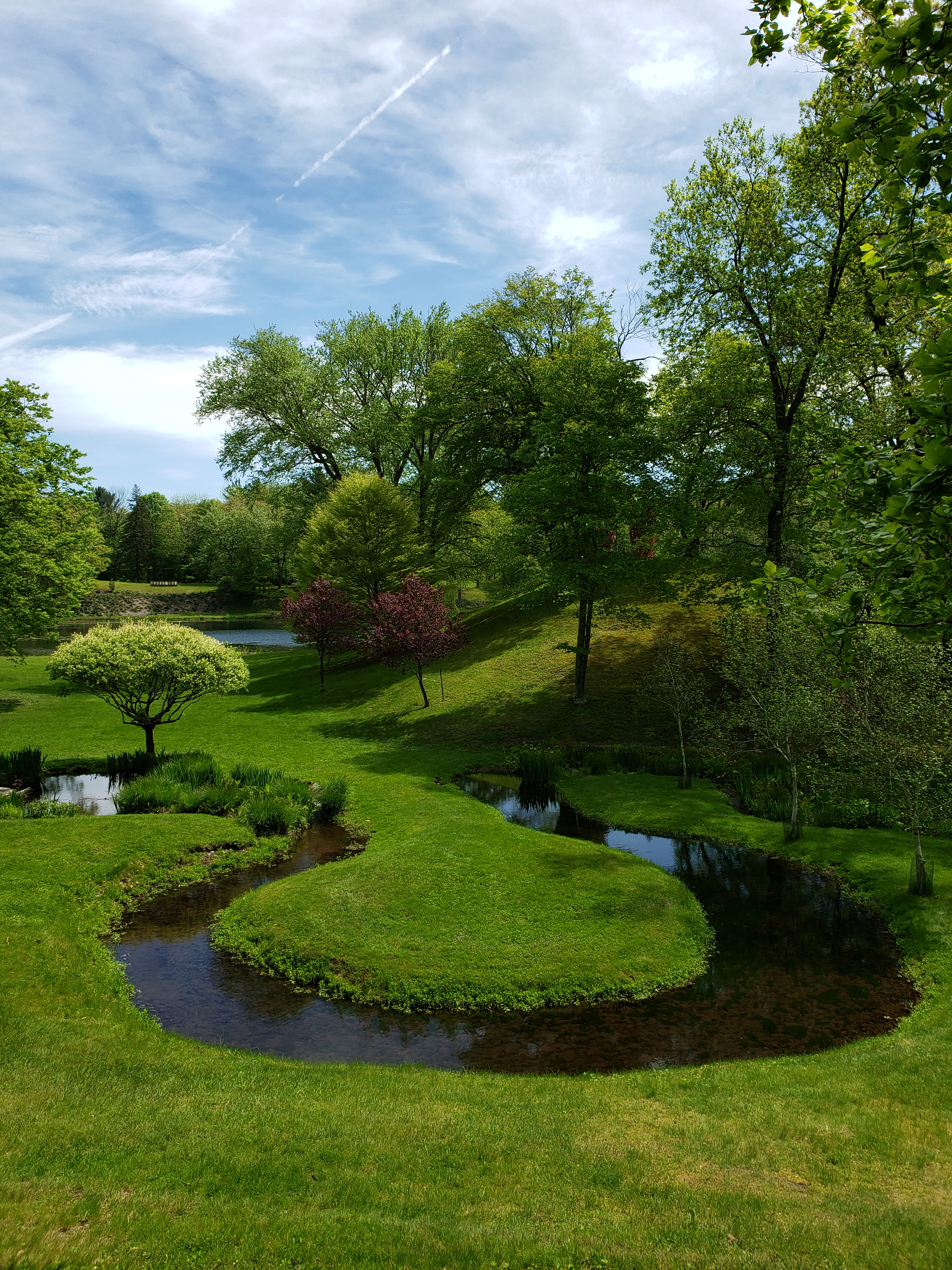
View of a meandering creek at Innisfree Garden

He developed and directed Innisfree Garden in Millbrook, New York, for over 55 years, using his knowledge of Chinese garden design. Collins died of cancer at the age of 79 in Sharon, Connecticut.

== Awards and honors ==
In 1964, Collins was named a Fellow of the American Society of Landscape Architects. Innisfree Garden was listed on the National Register of Historic Places in 2019.

== Publication ==
- Innisfree: An American Garden (Harry N. Abrams, 1994)
