= F. Herbert Bormann =

American plant ecologist (1922–2012)

F. Herbert Bormann (March 24, 1922 – June 7, 2012) was an American plant ecologist whose 1971 research within the Hubbard Brook Experimental Forest in New Hampshire with fellow scientists was credited with the discovery of acid rain. His research was one of the major contributory factors towards changes made in the United States' Clean Air Act in 1990. In 1993, he was awarded the Tyler Prize for Environmental Achievement and in 2003 he received the Blue Planet Prize, both awards alongside his colleague Gene Likens. His publications include 8 books and more than 200 journal articles.

Born in Manhattan, Bormann was raised in Westwood, New Jersey. He studied for one semester at the University of Idaho before enlisting in the United States Navy following the outbreak of World War II. He worked as a welder for the Navy during the war, after which he studied at Rutgers University (B.S. in Agricultural Science) and Duke University (Ph.D. in Plant Ecology). In 1952, he traveled to the University of Minnesota's Lake Itasca Field Station to take an advanced course on plant pathology, where he was introduced to oak wilt and its vascular transmission through root grafts — this was the genesis of his interest in vascularity and root grafts. Later that year he went on to teach ecology on the faculties of Emory University (1952–1956), Dartmouth College (1956–1966), and the Yale School of Forestry & Environmental Studies (1966–1992). He died in 2012 in North Branford, Connecticut from complications resulting from a lung infection.
