= Markus Borner =

Swiss zoologist and conservationist (1945–2020)

Markus Borner (23 April 1945 - 10 January 2020) was a Swiss zoologist and conservationist. He was a head of the Frankfurt Zoological Society’s Africa program for over 20 years. He worked at Serengeti National Park in Tanzania, Africa for over 40 years. There among others he studied wildlife migration patterns as well as was engaged in wildlife conservation activities.

He was an honorary professor at the University of Glasgow.

== Awards and honours ==
Borner was awarded the Bruno H. Schubert Prize in 1994 and was a finalist for the Indianapolis Prize in 2012. In 2016, Borner was awarded the Blue Planet Prize.
