= Blue Planet Prize =

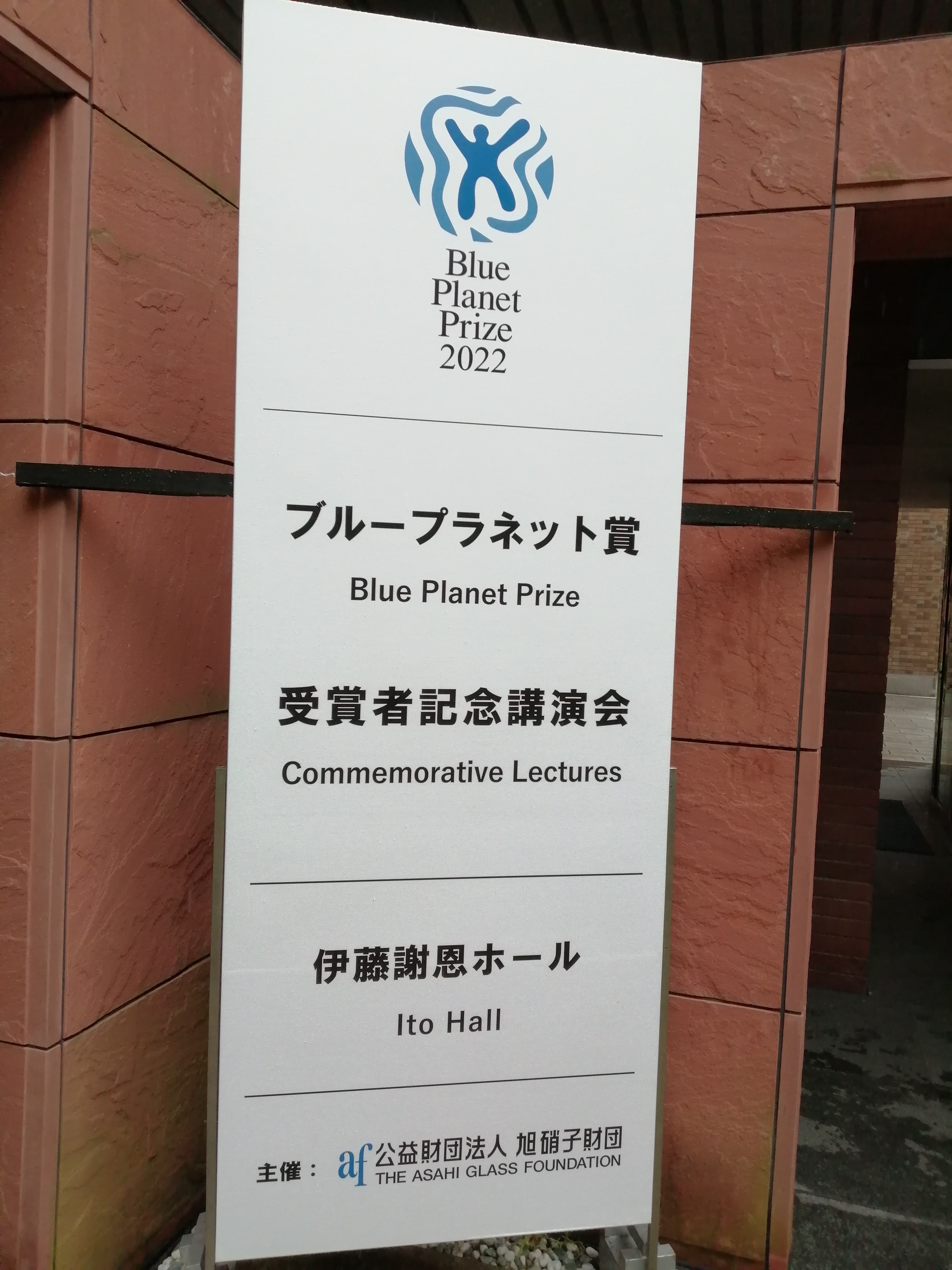
- Country: Japan
- Presented by: Asahi Glass Foundation
- Established: 1992
- Website: www.af-info.or.jp/en/blueplanet/

The Blue Planet Prize recognises outstanding efforts in scientific research or applications of science that contribute to solving global environmental problems. The prize was created by the Asahi Glass Foundation in 1992, the year of the Rio Earth Summit, and since then the foundation has awarded the prize to two winners every year. In 2012, twenty of the Blue Planet Prize winners collaborated on a joint paper that was launched at the UN Environment Programme's Governing Council meeting in Nairobi on 20 February.

== List of laureates ==
- 1992 Dr. Syukuro Manabe and the International Institute for Environment and Development
- 1993 Dr Charles D. Keeling and IUCN-The World Conservation Union
- 1994 Prof. Dr. Eugen Seibold and Mr. Lester R. Brown
- 1995 Mr. Maurice F. Strong and Dr. Bert Bolin
- 1996 Dr. Wallace S. Broecker and M.S. Swaminathan Research Foundation
- 1997 Dr. James E. Lovelock and Conservation International
- 1998 Prof. Mikhail I. Budyko and Mr. David R. Brower
- 1999 Dr. Paul R. Ehrlich and Prof. Qu Geping
- 2000 Dr. Theo Colborn and Dr. Karl-Henrik Robèrt
- 2001 Lord (Robert) May of Oxford and Dr. Norman Myers
- 2002 Professor Harold A. Mooney and Prof. J. Gustave Speth
- 2003 Dr. Gene E. Likens / Dr. F. Herbert Bormann and Dr. Vo Quy
- 2004 Dr. Susan Solomon and Dr. Gro Harlem Brundtland
- 2005 Prof. Sir Nicholas Shackleton and Dr. Gordon Hisashi Sato
- 2006 Dr. Akira Miyawaki and Dr. Emil Salim
- 2007 Professor Joseph Sax and Dr. Amory B. Lovins
- 2008 Dr. Claude Lorius and Professor José Goldemberg
- 2009 Professor Hirofumi Uzawa and Lord (Nicholas) Stern of Brentford
- 2010 Dr. James Hansen and Dr. Robert Watson
- 2011 Dr. Jane Lubchenco and Barefoot College
- 2012 Professor William E. Rees / Dr. Mathis Wackernagel and Dr. Thomas E. Lovejoy
- 2013 Dr. Taroh Matsuno and Dr. Daniel Sperling
- 2014 Prof. Herman Daly and Prof. Daniel H. Janzen / Instituto Nacional de Biodiversidad (INBio)
- 2015 Professor Sir Partha Dasgupta FBA FRS and Professor Jeffrey D. Sachs
- 2016 Mr. Pavan Sukhdev and Prof. Markus Borner
- 2017 Prof. Hans Joachim Schellnhuber and Prof. Gretchen C. Daily
- 2018 Prof. Brian Walker and Prof. Malin Falkenmark
- 2019 Prof. Eric Lambin and Prof. Jared Diamond
- 2020 Prof. David Tilman and Dr. Simon Stuart
- 2021 Prof. Veerabhadran Ramanathan and Prof. Mohan Munasinghe
- 2022 His Majesty Jigme Singye Wangchuck, the Fourth King of Bhutan and Prof. Stephen Carpenter
- 2023 Richard Thompson / Tamara Galloway / Penelope Lindeque and Debarati Guha-Sapir
- 2024 Prof. Robert Costanza and Intergovernmental Science-Policy Platform on Biodiversity and Ecosystem Services (IPBES)
- 2025 Prof. Robert B. Jackson and Dr. Jeremy Leggett
- 2026 Dr. Linda S. Birnbaum and Professor Edward Barbier

== See also ==
- List of environmental awards
