= Joseph Sax =

American lawyer (1936–2014)

- Born: Joseph Lawrence Sax; February 3, 1936; Chicago, Illinois, U.S.
- Died: March 9, 2014 (aged 78)
- Education: Harvard University; University of Chicago Law School (JD)
- Occupations: Lawyer; environmental law professor
- Known for: Developing the public trust doctrine
- Awards: Blue Planet Prize (2007)

Joseph Lawrence Sax (February 3, 1936 – March 9, 2014) was an American environmental law professor, known for developing the public trust doctrine.

Born and raised in Chicago, Sax graduated from Harvard University in 1957 and then earned a J.D. degree in 1959 from the University of Chicago Law School. After a few years in private practice and at the Department of Justice he began teaching, first with the University of Colorado in 1962 and then at the University of Michigan in 1965. He joined the University of California, Berkeley School of Law in 1986.

From 1994 to 1996, Sax worked with the Clinton Administration under Interior Secretary Bruce Babbitt.

Sax was involved in environmental and conservation law from early in his career, working with the Sierra Club in Colorado. drafting Michigan's environmental law (known as the "Sax Act") and working on a variety of water resource cases in California.

== Works ==
Books

- Playing Darts With a Rembrandt: Public and Private Rights to Cultural Treasures (1999)
- Mountains Without Handrails
- Water Law--Planning and Policy
- Water Law--Cases and Commentary
- Defending the Environment

Scholarly articles

- "The Public Trust Doctrine in Natural Resource Law: Effective Judicial Intervention", 68 Michigan Law Review 471 (1970)

== Awards ==
- Blue Planet Prize - 2007, from the Asahi Glass Foundation ("likened to a Nobel for environmental science")
- American Academy of Arts and Sciences, fellow
- Distinguished Faculty Achievement Award, University of Michigan
- Elizabeth Haub Environmental Prize of the Free University of Brussels
- Audubon Society's Conservationist of the Year Award
- William O. Douglas Legal Achievement Award from the Sierra Club
- Environmental Quality Award of the U.S. Environmental Protection Agency
