= University of Rochester Arboretum =

Arboretum in Rochester, New York, United States

Coordinates: 43°07′42″N 77°37′42″W

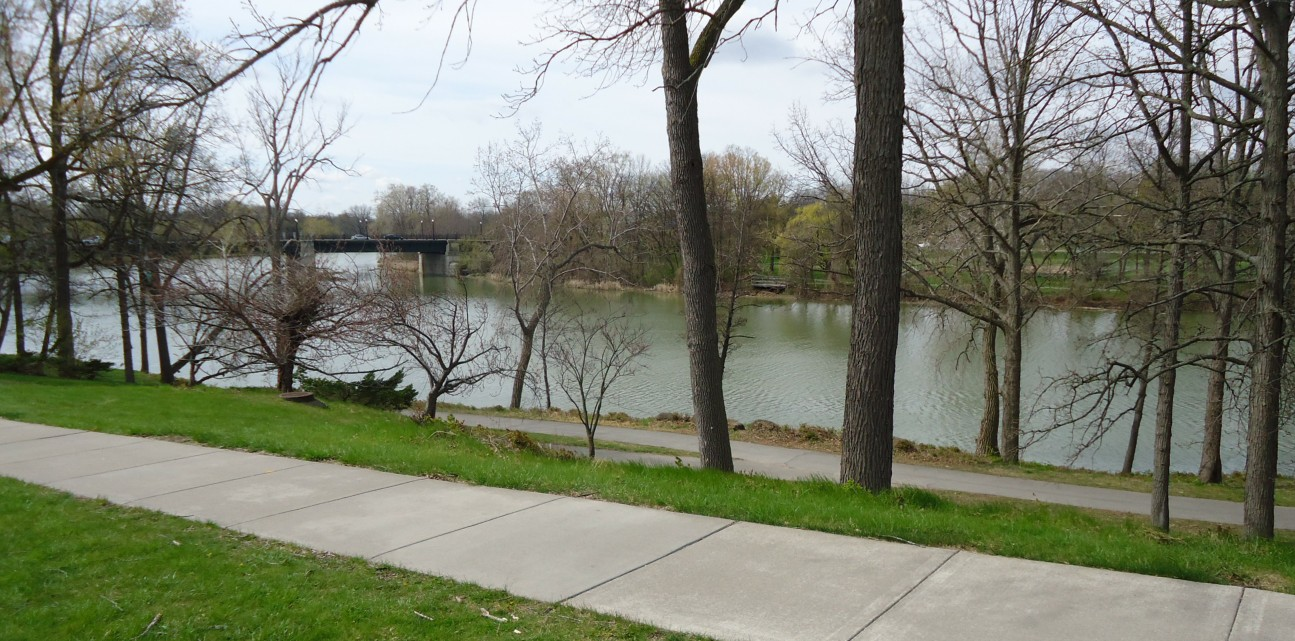
- Interactive map of University of Rochester Arboretum

The University of Rochester Arboretum is an arboretum located across the River Campus of the University of Rochester, 612 Wilson Boulevard, Rochester, New York.

The River Campus is located beside the Genesee River on a site previously owned by the Oak Hill Country Club. Famed landscape architect Frederick Law Olmsted, Sr. had designed a "River Walk" of oak trees along the river; and after the university purchased the site in 1923, his son Frederick Law Olmsted Jr. served as landscape designer and consultant to the campus architects. In 1999 certain areas of the campus were designated as the arboretum.

The River Walk was recently sold to the City of Rochester as public parkland along the river corridor. In a 1 km (¾ mile) area between Elmwood Avenue and Intercampus Drive are 197 oak trees representing 15 species. Trees in the arboretum proper currently include: American beech (Fagus grandifolia), Amur corktree (Phellodendron amurense), Baldcypress (Taxodium distichum), Black Gum (Nyssa sylvatica), Dawn Redwood (Metasequoia glyptostroboides), Goldenraintree (Koelreuteria paniculata), Hally Jolivette cherry (Prunus 'Hally Jolivette'), Japanese Pagoda Tree (Styphnolobium japonicum), Japanese Zelkova (Zelkova serrata), Katsura Tree (Cercidiphyllum japonicum), Kentucky Coffeetree (Gymnocladus dioicus), Kanzan cherry (Prunus serrulata 'Kanzan'), Late Lilac (Syringa villosa), Miyabe's Maple (Acer miyabei), Osage-orange (Maclura pomifera), Paperbark Maple (Acer griseum), Northern Red Oak (Quercus rubra), Scarlet Oak (Quercus coccinea), Wych Elm (Ulmus glabra), Shadblow serviceberry (Amelanchier canadensis), sweetgum (Liquidambar styraciflua) and Tulip-tree (Liriodendron tulipifera).

Although not located on the River Campus, the university grounds also contain two state champion trees, a weeping willow and a Ponderosa Pine. They are the largest known examples in the New York state.

== See also ==
- List of botanical gardens in the United States
