= Daniel Sperling =

American academic

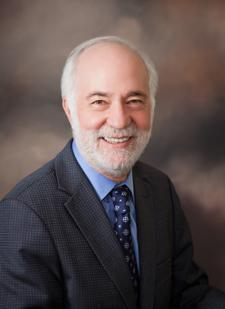
Prof. Daniel Sperling

Daniel Sperling (born March 27, 1951, in Albany, New York, United States) is the American founding director of the Institute of Transportation Studies at the University of California, Davis (ITS-Davis); professor of civil and environmental engineering; professor of environmental science and policy; and faculty director of the Policy Institute for Energy, Environment, and the Economy at the University of California, Davis.

== Education ==
Sperling received his bachelor's degree in environmental engineering and urban planning from Cornell University in 1973, and his Ph.D. in transportation engineering from the University of California, Berkeley (with minors in economics, energy and resources) in 1982.

== Career ==
From 1973 to 1975, he worked as an urban planner for the Peace Corps in Honduras. From 1976 to 1977 he worked as an environmental planner for the United States Environmental Protection Agency. In 1991, Sperling founded the UC Davis Institute of Transportation Studies, bringing government, industry, and nongovernmental organizations together to conduct groundbreaking scientific research, and better inform environmental and transportation policy makers. ITS-Davis is now home to more than 60 affiliated faculty and researchers and over 130 graduate students.

In 2007, he was appointed to the California Air Resources Board., and named co-director of the California Low Carbon Fuel Standard study. He is currently Vice Chair of the Transportation Research Board of the National Academies and in 2015 he will be named Chair. He is currently an associate editor of the journal Transportation Research Part D He is also the Co-Director of the National Center for Sustainable Transportation, a U.S. Department of Transportation research, education, and outreach consortium aimed at reducing greenhouse-gas emissions from passenger and freight travel.

== Honors and awards ==
In 2004, Sperling was selected as a National Associate of the National Academies, an organization dedicated to advising the government and public on matters of science, technology, and health.

He was appointed chair of the Council on the Future of Transportation for the World Economic Forum in 2009. Sperling appeared on The Daily Show with Jon Stewart to discuss the sustainable transportation issues spotlighted in Sperling’s book Two Billion Cars: Driving Toward Sustainability (2009). In 2010, he was one of ten recipients of the 16th Annual Heinz Award with special focus on global change. He is one of two winners of the 2013 Blue Planet Prize by the Asahi Glass Foundation of Tokyo, which is described as the “Nobel prize for the environmental sciences.” In 2013, he served as chair of the California Fuel Cell Partnership, a public-private organization aimed at promoting the commercialization of hydrogen fuel cell vehicles.

== Research and publications ==
Since 1981, Prof. Sperling has authored more than 200 technical papers and 12 books, including Two Billion Cars: Driving Toward Sustainability published in 2009.
