= Hubbard Brook Experimental Forest =

Area of land in New Hampshire, U.S.

Coordinates: 43°56′42″N 71°43′11″W

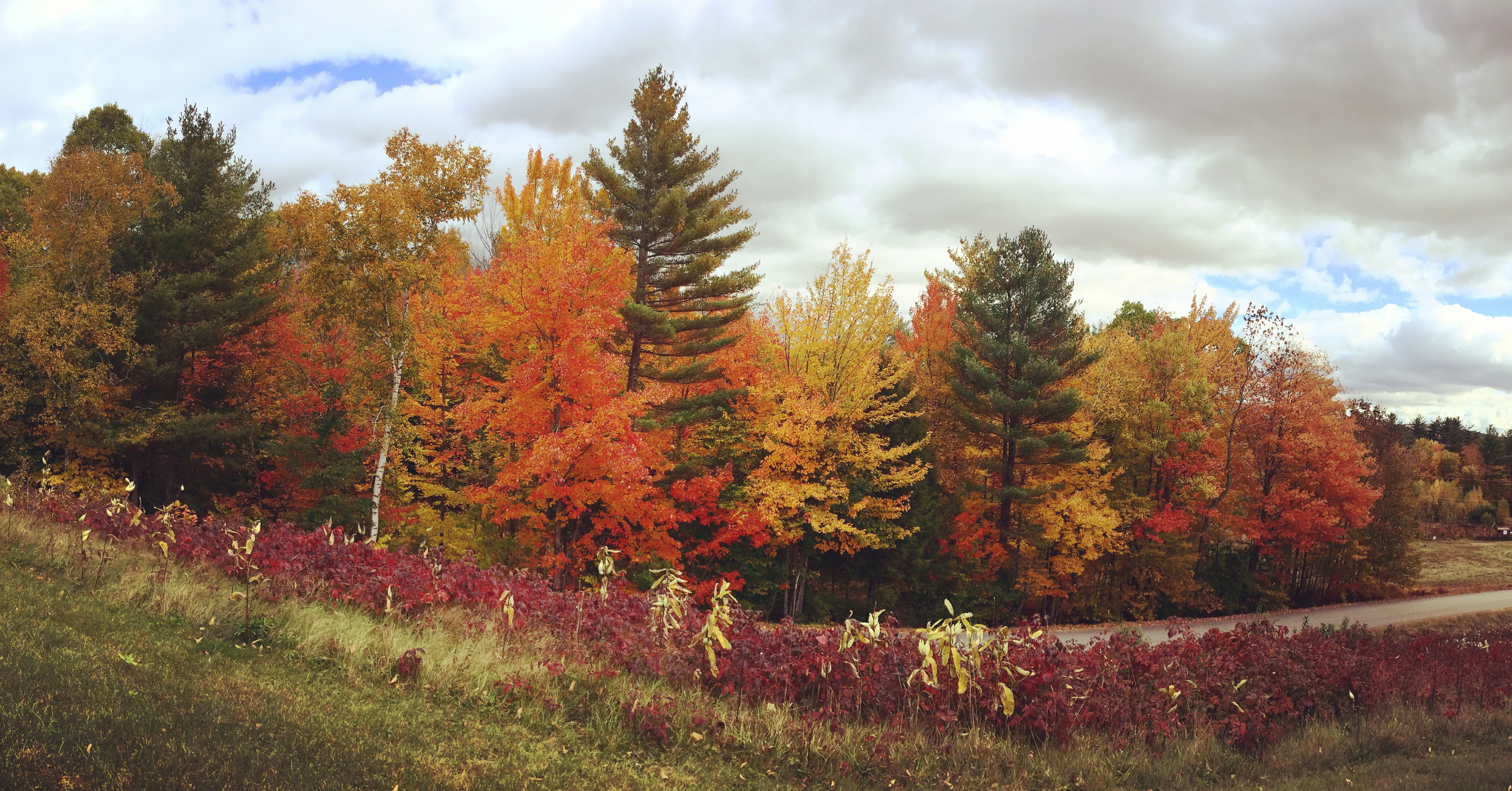
Hubbard Brook Experimental Forest, 2015

Hubbard Brook Experimental Forest is an area of land in the towns of Woodstock, Ellsworth and Thornton in the White Mountains of New Hampshire that functions as an outdoor laboratory for ecological studies. It was established in 1955 by the United States Forest Service for the study of the relationship between forest cover and water quality and supply.

== Forest land management ==
In 1955, the first tract was dedicated in the Hubbard Brook watershed, just west of the village of West Thornton, New Hampshire. The first stream in the forest was fitted with monitoring devices in 1956. Subsequently, seven additional headwater streams and their associated watersheds were delimited for study. Each such zone functions essentially as a closed environmental system. Since the efflux of water, minerals, and water-bound organisms leaving each watershed (and leaving the entire forest as well) can be monitored, the effects of changes experimentally introduced into the system can be measured.

== Hubbard Brook Ecosystem Study ==
For the first five or six years after its establishment the HBEF was used for research in forestry but soon its value for study of the forest ecosystem was recognized and it attracted the interest of researchers from major universities. The work at Hubbard Brook has led researchers there and elsewhere to try to model or better understand the complex forest ecosystem, including its interaction with humans. HBEF research teams have succeeded in elucidating a number of vexing environmental problems, most notably the harmful effects of acid rain. The forest preservation the research promotes helps to protect watershed chemistry, ambient humidity, seasonal temperature fluctuations, and wildlife habitats.

=== History ===
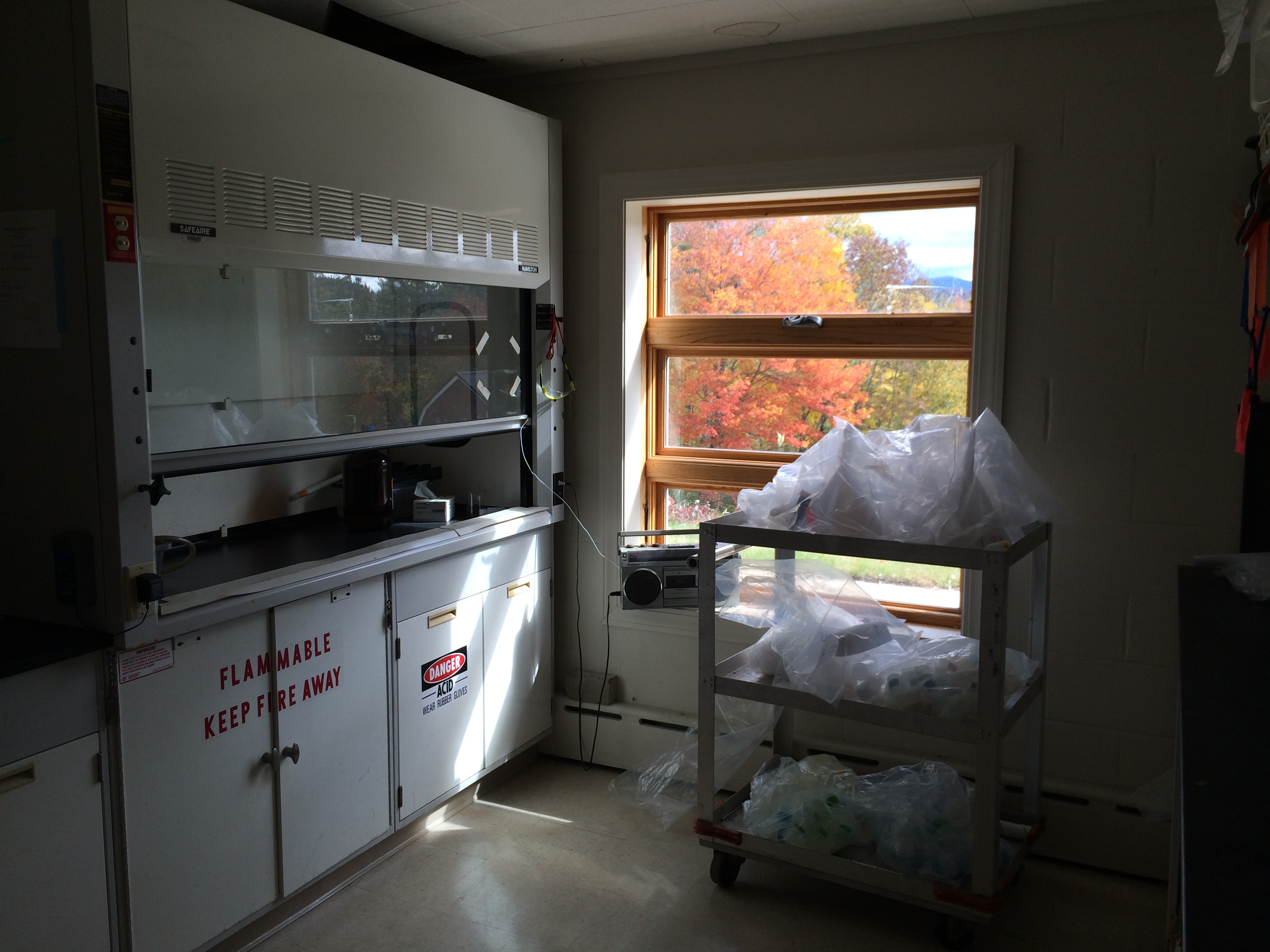
Hubbard Brook Experimental Forest laboratory, 2015

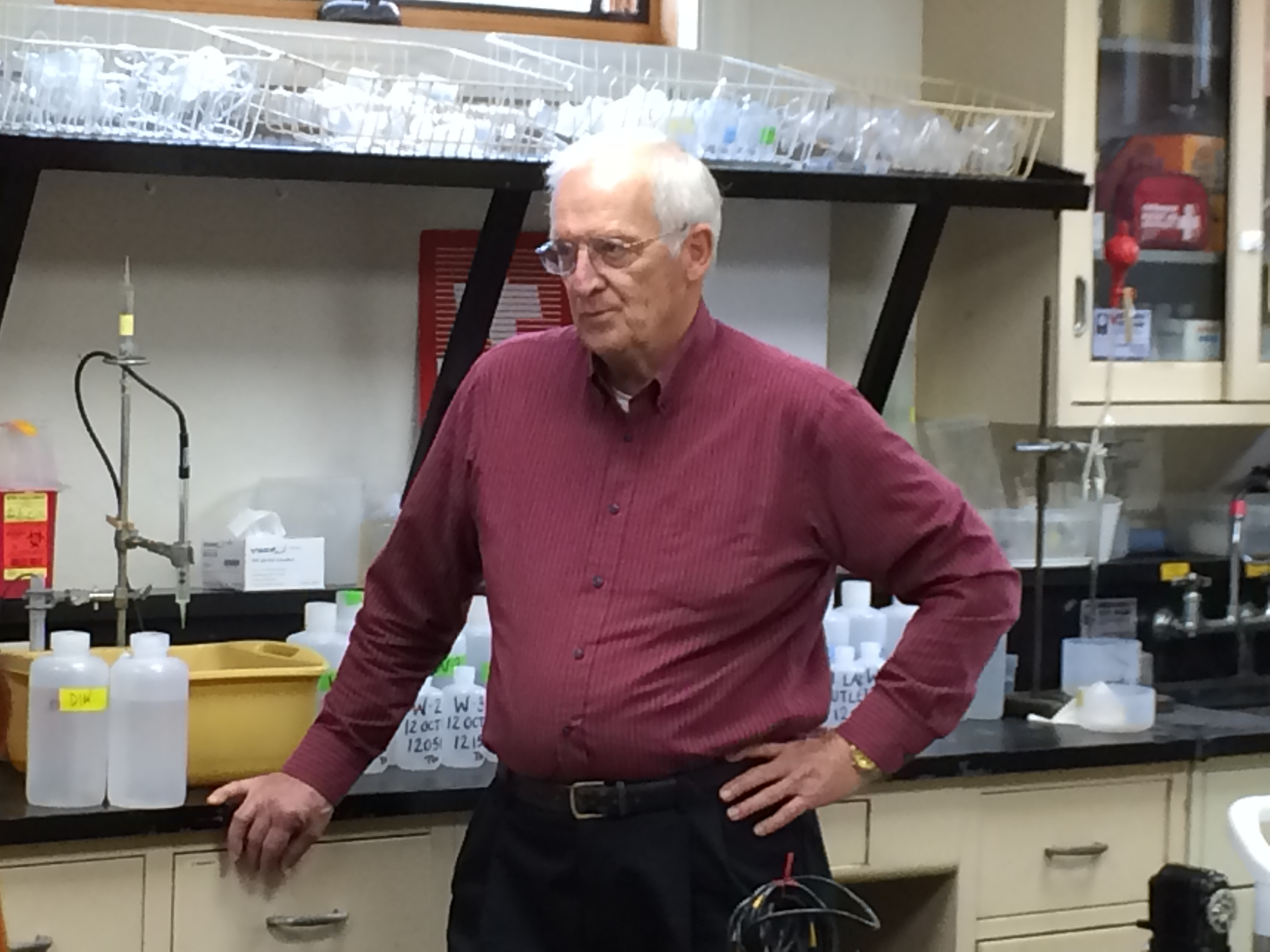
Gene Likens in the laboratory, 2015

The idea for using the small watershed approach being used at Hubbard Brook for studies of elemental budgets and cycles was born with Professor F. Herbert Bormann of Dartmouth College, who began taking his botany classes for field trips to this area of the White Mountain National Forest in the early 1950s, and Forest Service scientist Robert Pierce. Bormann proposed to Pierce that the area set aside by the Forest Service for watershed studies be used for closed-system ecological studies.

In 1960, soon after the establishment of HBEF, ecologist Gene Likens and geologist Noye Johnson, both from Dartmouth, joined the research team. In 1963, the group received a $60,000 grant from the National Science Foundation to study "Hydrological-Mineral Cycle Interaction in a Small Watershed". This study evolved into the series of longitudinal studies now referred to as the "Hubbard Brook Ecosystem Study", or HBES. The early ecosystem monitoring was aimed at studying the effects of forest management practices on water flow and quality. These data have been helpful as baselines for the increasingly sophisticated areas of ongoing research in the forest. HBES has spawned over 2000 scientific papers, perhaps most important a 1968 study that documented the widespread presence of "acid rain". HBRF was designated as a Long-Term Ecological Research (LTER) site in 1988 and has some of the longest on-going ecological datasets.

Currently the study comprises researchers from multiple universities, including Dartmouth College, Yale University, Cornell University, Syracuse University, SUNY ESF, the University of New Hampshire, Keene State College and the University of Vermont. The Hubbard Brook Research Foundation provides housing for research assistants at nearby Pleasant View Farm and recently completed the purchase of cottages for visiting and resident scientists around Mirror Lake, the point at which Hubbard Brook exits the experimental forest.

Hubbard Brook Experimental Forest is the most recently added research forest under USFS jurisdiction for hydrologic studies in the eastern and southern United States.

== Hubbard Brook ecosystem ==
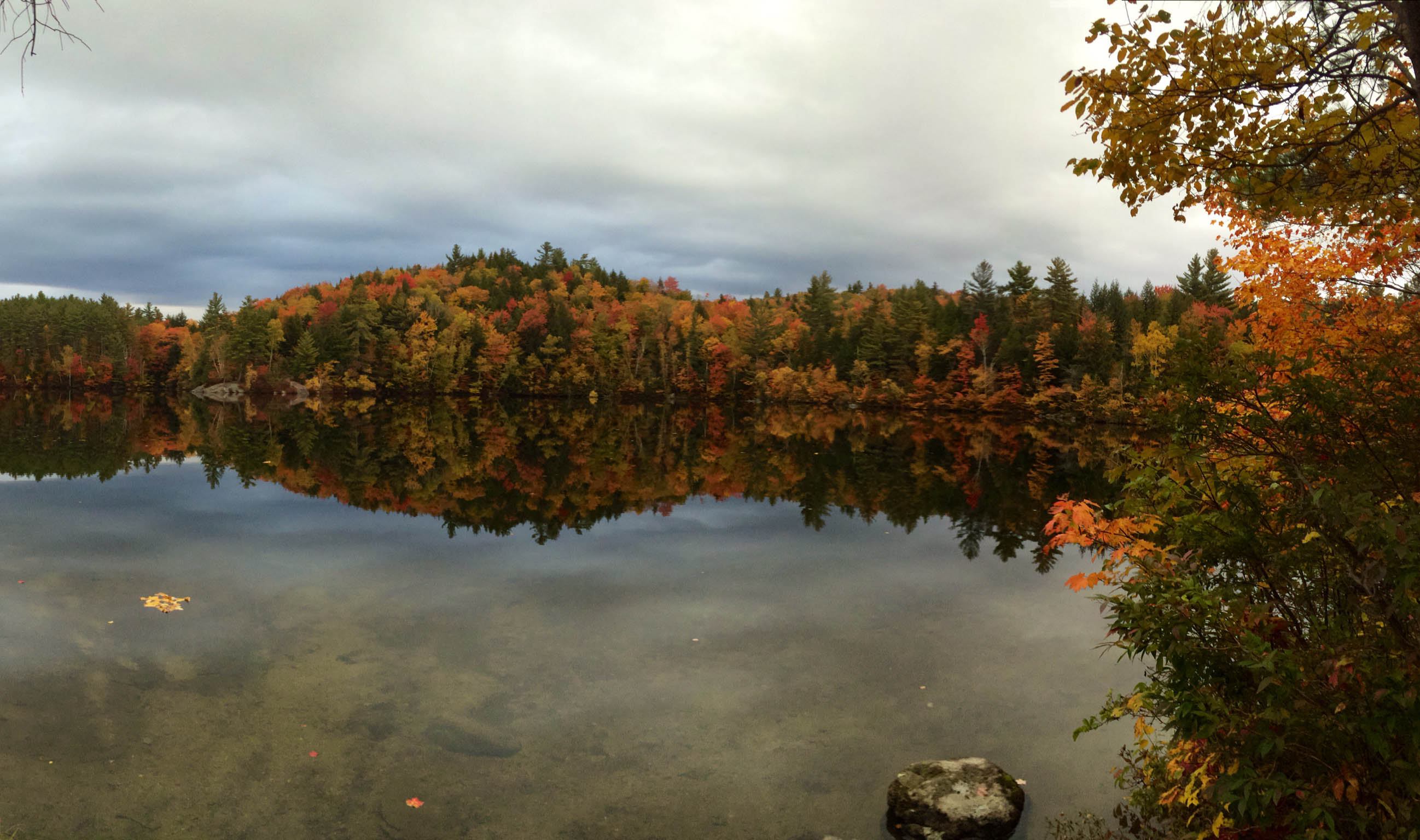
Mirror Lake, 2015

Located in the White Mountain National Forest in central New Hampshire, within the town of Woodstock, the 31-square-kilometer (12 sq mi) bowl-shaped forested valley has hilly terrain, ranging from 222 to 1,015 meters (728 to 3,330 ft) in altitude. The forest comprises nine individual watersheds, each of which drains into Hubbard Brook which flows eastward into the Pemigewasset River near West Thornton. The outlet from Mirror Lake, a much-studied pond and recreation site, flows south into Hubbard Brook just before the brook passes under Interstate 93.

=== Forest ===
The forest is mostly a "second-growth" mix of northern hardwoods (80 to 90%) and red spruce-balsam fir (10 to 20%). Beech, yellow birch, and sugar maple experience their greatest importance at 570 meters (1,870 ft), 570 to 650 meters (1,870 to 2,130 ft), and 720 meters (2,360 ft), respectively, with paper birch, fir, and spruce at 720m to treeline (>775 meters (2,543 ft)). Mountain maple, striped maple, and mountain ash characterize the understory at various elevations, with mountain maple being ubiquitous. Five of the seven canopy species are valued for various reasons. Harsh winter conditions do not allow for rapid recovery, unlike more humid climates that recover net primary productivity within years, the northeastern version needs decades and in the case of the forest floor possibly centuries to recover. The forest was partly cleared for agriculture starting in the late 18th century and was also logged. By 1920 over 200 million board feet (470,000 m^{3}) of timber had been harvested from the valley.

=== Soils ===
Soil is predominantly well-drained spodosol derived from glacial till, with sandy loam textures, combining to produce an evident, but narrow E horizon. The forest floor is characterized by the complete suite of taxonomic subhorizons, has been classified as mor type humus, with mull occurring beneath maple stands at lower elevations (600 meters (2,000 ft)). It is acidic (pH about 4.5 or less) and relatively infertile for agricultural purposes. Aluminum and iron are preferentially leached from the upper soil horizons to an underlying layer(s) that is characteristic of the soil order. Hence, silica is retained and at times mixes with the forest floor. Soil depths are highly variable, with shallow strands of organic matter comprising the entire profile at higher elevations (folist) or underlain by sandy unsorted material (podzol).

=== Climate ===
Annual precipitation averages about 1,400 millimeters (55 in), with one-third to one-quarter as snow. January averages about -9 °C and the average July temperature is 18 °C. The forest averages 145 frost-free days per year.

== Areas of research ==
1. Hydrology, including ecosystem water flow, snowfall analysis, and long-term ice-in/ice-out measurements
2. Environmental factors encouraging or restricting tree growth, and effects of deforestation on mineral flux
3. Effects of environmental changes on bird behavior and insect population, especially regarding reproductive capacity
4. Effects of acid rain and resultant soil mineral changes on micro-environments of plant root systems
5. Cycling of Nitrogen, Sulfur, Phosphorus, Mercury, Calcium, and Carbon, and effects of pollution on flux of these and other minerals

== Hubbard Brook Research Foundation ==
The Hubbard Brook Research Foundation supports the work of the Hubbard Brook Ecosystem Study, which is conducted at the USDA Forest Service's Hubbard Brook Experimental Forest in New Hampshire's White Mountain National Forest. HBRF supports research by maintaining facilities for housing, meetings, and laboratory work. The Foundation also helps transmit the findings of the Hubbard Brook Ecosystem Study to policymakers, opinion leaders, and other members of the public through its Science Links program, which translates science from peer-reviewed scientific articles and conducts a variety of education and outreach activities.

== Annual symposium ==
Each summer, Hubbard Brook scientists and experts from afar gather at the base station for a 2-day colloquium to present and discuss ongoing research. Approximately 150 scientists and students attend the program, which features eighty-odd 10-minute presentations in which participants openly criticize and contribute new ideas to each presenter's findings.
