= Mary Flagler Cary Arboretum =

Nonprofit arboretum in New York

Coordinates: 41.7852°N 73.7336°W

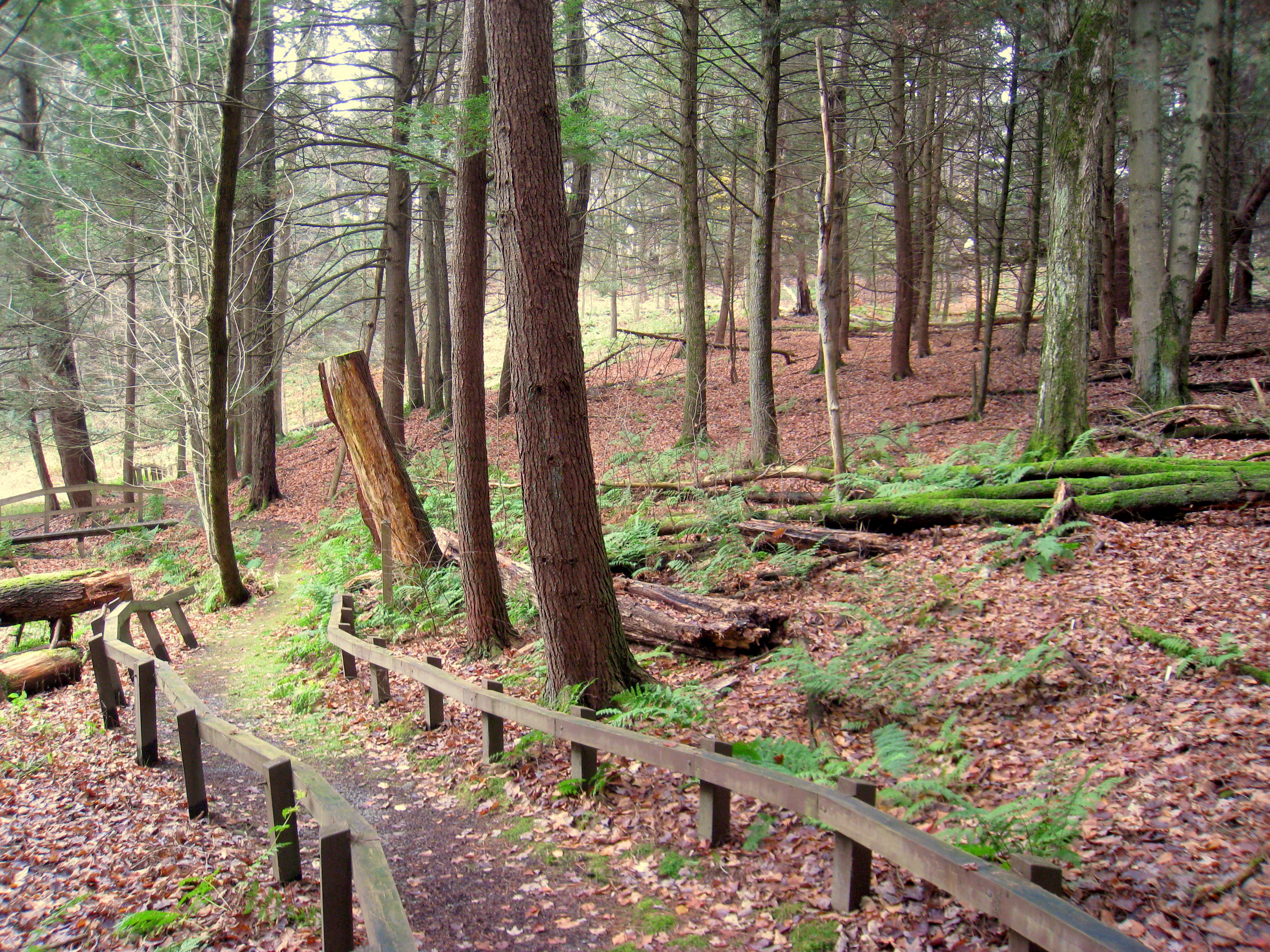
- Interactive map of Mary Flagler Cary Arboretum
- Nearest town: Millbrook, New York
- Area: 1,924 acres (779 ha)
- Founder: Mary Flagler Cary

The Mary Flagler Cary Arboretum (1,924 acres; 7.7 km^{2}) is a nonprofit arboretum located on U.S. Route 44 near Millbrook, New York. It is operated by the Cary Institute of Ecosystem Studies, and open to the public without an admission fee. The arboretum was established by Mary Flagler Cary (1901–1967), a granddaughter of Henry Morrison Flagler and heir to part of the Standard Oil fortune, and her husband Melbert Cary. After her husband's death in 1941, Mrs. Cary maintained the property, with a special interest in its maples. Following her death in 1967, she left the estate to a trust. In 1971 its trustees asked the New York Botanical Garden to oversee the property, which was then named the Mary Flagler Cary Arboretum. In the 1980s, the Institute for Ecosystem Studies was founded, and in the 1990s it became an independent, nonprofit corporation. In 2008, the Institute adopted a new name, the Cary Institute of Ecosystem Studies

The arboretum contains meadow, forest, swamp, hills, and trout streams, with the following walking trails:

- Cary Pines Trail (1.3 miles, 2.1 km) - path through open spaces, thickets, and pine and hemlock forests.
- Fern Glen - boardwalk through habitat of more than 150 species of trees, ferns, and wildflowers.
- Sedge Meadow Trail - short boardwalk path through wetland with red maples.
- Wappinger Creek Trail (1.25 miles, 2 km) - follows the east branch of Wappinger Creek, a tributary of the Hudson River, through forests, marshes, and old field

== See also ==
- List of botanical gardens in the United States
