= Millbrook, New York =

Village in Dutchess County, New York, US

- Village
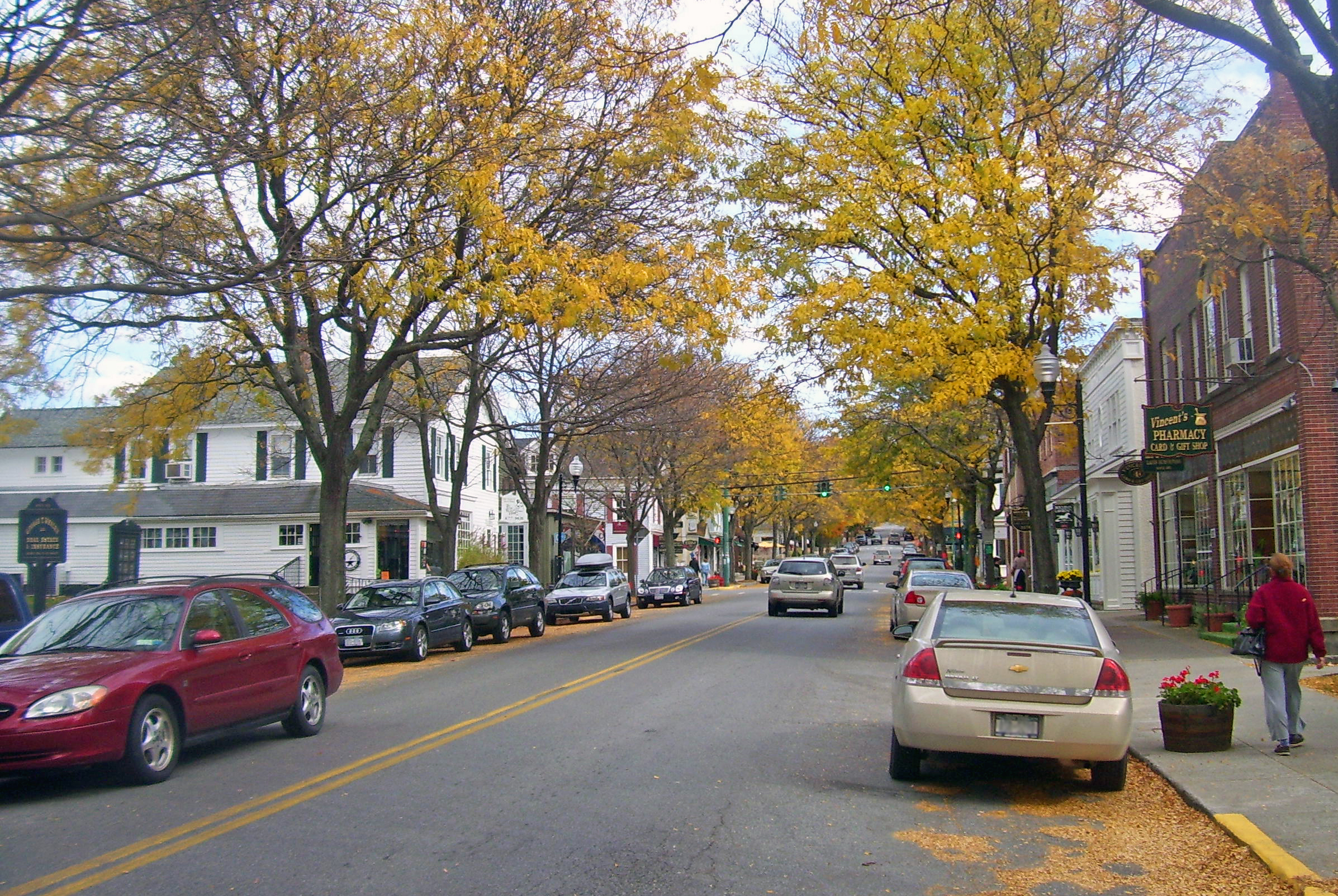
- Franklin Ave
- Etymology: From local estate
- Location in Dutchess County and the state of New York

- Location of New York in the United States
- Coordinates: 41°47′5″N 73°41′16″W
- Country: United States
- State: New York
- County: Dutchess
- Town: Washington
- Founded: 1895

Government
  - Mayor: Peter Doro (R)
  - Board: Trustees: • Patrick Murphy - Deputy Mayor (R); • Elizabeth Socci (R); • Shannon Mawson (D); • Julia Bucklin (D)

Area
  - Total: 1.92 sq mi (4.96 km^{2})
  - Land: 1.86 sq mi (4.82 km^{2})
  - Water: 0.054 sq mi (0.14 km^{2})
- Elevation: 480 ft (150 m)
- Highest elevation (N of SE corner): 870 ft (270 m)
- Lowest elevation (East Branch Wappinger Creek at W village line): 450 ft (140 m)

Population (2020)
  - Total: 1,455
  - Density: 782.4/sq mi (302.08/km^{2})
- Time zone: UTC-5 (Eastern (EST))
  - Summer (DST): UTC-4 (EDT)
- ZIP Code: 12545
- Area code: 845
- FIPS code: 36-47273
- GNIS feature ID: 0957288
- Wikimedia Commons: Millbrook, New York
- Website: villageofmillbrookny.com

Millbrook is a village in Dutchess County, New York, United States. Millbrook is located in the Hudson Valley, on the east side of the Hudson River, 90 miles (140 km) north of New York City. Millbrook is near the center of the town of Washington, of which it is a part. In the 2020 census, Millbrook's population was 1,455.

The Millbrook Inn on Camby & Gifford Rd (August 2025)

Millbrook is part of the Kiryas Joel–Poughkeepsie–Newburgh, NY Metropolitan Statistical Area as well as the larger New York–Newark–Bridgeport Combined Statistical Area.

== Geography ==
According to the United States Census Bureau, the village has a total area of 1.901 square miles (4.92 km^{2}), of which 1.9 square miles (4.9 km^{2}) is land and 0.1 square miles (0.26 km^{2}) (2.60%) is water.

== Demographics ==
Historical population
Census	Pop.	Note	%±
1890	693		—
1900	1,027		48.2%
1910	1,136		10.6%
1920	1,096		−3.5%
1930	1,296		18.2%
1940	1,340		3.4%
1950	1,568		17.0%
1960	1,717		9.5%
1970	1,736		1.1%
1980	1,343		−22.6%
1990	1,339		−0.3%
2000	1,429		6.7%
2010	1,452		1.6%
2020	1,455		0.2%
U.S. Decennial Census

As of the census of 2000, there were 1,429 people, 678 households, and 361 families residing in the village. The population density was 764.3 inhabitants per square mile (295.1/km^{2}). There were 744 housing units at an average density of 397.90 per square mile (153.63/km^{2}). The racial makeup of the village was 95.90% white, 2.70% African American, 0.20% Asian, 0.30% from other races, and 1.00% from two or more races. Hispanic or Latino of any race were 3.00% of the population.

There were 678 households, out of which 23.7% had children under the age of 18 living with them, 42.6% were married couples living together, 8.3% had a female householder with no husband present, and 46.8% were non-families. 40.9% of all households were made up of individuals, and 19.0% had someone living alone who was 65 years of age or older. The average household size was 2.10 and the average family size was 2.88.

In the village, the population was spread out, with 21.0% under the age of 18, 5.9% from 18 to 24, 25.3% from 25 to 44, 26.7% from 45 to 64, and 21.1% who were 65 years of age or older. The median age was 44 years. For every 100 females, there were 85.1 males. For every 100 females age 18 and over, there were 82.4 males.

The median income for a household in the village was $68,552, and the median income for a family was $96,473. Males had a median income of $67,917 versus $57,400 for females. The per capita income for the village was $49,114. About 1.0% of families and 5.7% of the population were below the poverty line, including 4.4% of those under age 18 and 1.9% of those age 65 or over.

== History ==
The site of present-day Millbrook was originally part of a much larger land grant given in 1697. In the years before the American Revolution, two nearby settlements - Mechanic and Hart's Village - were established within the confines of the modern Millbrook.

In 1869, the Dutchess and Columbia Railroad commenced operating with a stop called Millbrook, named after an adjacent farm. This new rail stop lay between Mechanic and Hart's Village and the economic opportunities it afforded soon led to a developing village centered on the Millbrook stop. However, it was not until 1895 that Millbrook was incorporated as a village.

Millbrook is the site of the Hitchcock Estate, which Timothy Leary made a nexus of the psychedelic movement in the 1960s and where he conducted research and wrote The Psychedelic Experience.

== Schools and colleges ==
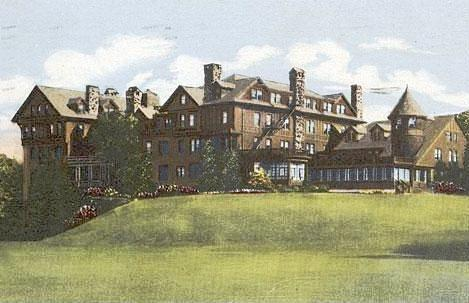
Bennett Junior College Halcyon Hall (circa 1910)

- Dutchess Day School
- Millbrook Central School District
  - Millbrook High School
- Millbrook School
- Upton Lake Christian Academy
- Cardinal Hayes School
- Millbrook Community Preschool at Grace Church

Millbrook was also the location of the campus of the former Bennett College, which closed in 1978.

The Roman Catholic Archdiocese of New York operated St. Joseph's School in Millbrook which closed in 2013.

== Points of interest ==
- Mary Flagler Cary Arboretum
- Innisfree Garden
- Nine Partners Meeting House
- Wing Castle
- Rocky Reef Trebuchet (Stanfordville)
- Millbrook Winery and Vineyard
- Canoe Hill Restaurant and Oyster Bar
- Wethersfield House and Gardens
- Mashomack Preserve Club polo fields
- Millbrook Jewelry
- Orvis Sandanona
- Cary Institute of Ecosystem Studies
- Trevor Zoo at Millbrook School
- Bennett College (ruins)
- Millbrook Golf and Tennis Club
- Tamarack Preserve Ltd
- House of Stefas

== Transportation ==
Millbrook is served by Dutchess County Public Transit's route "D" bus.

== Notable people ==
- Gerardo Colacicco, pastor and auxiliary bishop
- Ralph Della-Volpe (1923–2017), American painter, teacher
- Hamilton Fish IV, (1926–1996) congressman who resided in Millbrook while serving in office
- Nick Fish (1958–2020), attorney and member of the Portland City Commission
- John Wesley Hanes II, (1892–1987) investment banker and corporate turnaround specialist who served as undersecretary of the United States Treasury
- H. R. Hays (1904–1980), novelist, playwright, poet, academic, and television writer. Grew up in Millbrook.
- Timothy Leary, Harvard psychologist involved in the "psychedelic movement"
- Bette Midler, singer, songwriter, actress, comedian, philanthropist
- Richard Migliore, 2005 Jockey of the Year; retired in 2010
- Mary Tyler Moore, (1936–2017) actress
- Ric Ocasek, (1944–2019) Rockstar and singer. Head of The Cars
- Paulina Porizkova, Supermodel and influencer
- Franklin Delano Roosevelt Jr., congressman
- Martin Schroeter,CEO Kyndryl
- Walter C. Teagle, (1878–1962) president of Standard Oil
- Oakleigh Thorne, (July 31, 1866 − May 23, 1948), businessman, publisher, banker, and philanthropist
- Doug Tompkins, (March 20, 1943 – December 8, 2015), co-founder of The North Face and Esprit
