= Carmel Humphries =

Irish zoologist (1909–1986)

- Born: 3 June 1909; Waterford, County Waterford, Ireland
- Died: 7 March 1986 (aged 76); Rathmines, Dublin
- Known for: work on Irish Chironomidae

Carmel Humphries MRIA (3 June 1909 – 7 March 1986) was an Irish zoologist, specialist in fresh water Chironomidae. She was the first female professor of zoology and head of department in Ireland, and devised a technique for the identification of chironomid flies that is still employed today.

== Life ==
Carmel Frances Humphries was born in Waterford on 3 June 1909, to engineer William Francis, and Annie Humphries (née Palmer). She was one of five children, sisters Annie (married Frank Kane) and Martha, and brothers William Francis (married Nancy Russell), and Alban.

Humphries was first educated at the Ursuline convent, Waterford, and at the Loreto College, St Stephen's Green, Dublin. She entered University College Dublin (UCD) in 1929 to study science. During the course of her undergraduate study, Humphries won numerous scholarships, graduating in 1932 with an honours B.Sc. in botany and zoology. She went on to gain an M.Sc. and H.Dip.Ed. in zoology and education in 1933, going on to win a travelling scholarship in zoology with National University of Ireland (NUI) the same year. Humphries had developed an interest in pursuing a career in limnology (the study of lakes) rather than teaching, which she then studied abroad.

== Career ==
Humphries worked with Winifred Frost, T. T. Macan and H. P. Moon at the Freshwater biological station at Windermere in England from 1934 to 1936, focusing on the Benthic zone fauna in the lakes of Cumbria. Her work looked at the taxonomy of the larval and pupal stages of Chironomidae (non-biting midges or chironomids), resulting in a publication in the Journal of Animal Ecology in 1936. Humphries continued her study of chironomids at the Hydrobiologische Anstalt (later the Max-Planck-Institut für Limnologie) at Plön from 1936 to 1938, working with August Thienemann. Thienemann was a co-founder of the International Society of Limnology, and he was influential in Humphries undertaking the first comprehensive study of community composition and emergence periods of the Chironomidae of the Großer Plöner See. This group are deemed particularly difficult to identify or "taxonomically challenging". The results of this study were published in 1937 and 1938. She developed a method for the identification of Chironomidae by examining the microscopic skin the adult fly sheds when emerging from the pupa.

It was based on this work that Humphries was awarded a PhD from NUI upon her return to Ireland in 1938, and became an assistant in zoology at NUI Galway until 1939. Over the next few years she held a number of temporary positions including senior demonstrator in zoology at UCD from 1939 to 1941 and assistant at Queen's University Belfast from 1941 to 1942, until being appointed permanently as an assistant in the zoology department at UCD in 1942, remaining at UCD for the rest of her career. She went on to be made statutory lecturer in zoology in 1947, succeeded James Bayley Butler as head of department in 1957 which made her the first female professor of zoology and head of department in the country. Humphries retired from UCD in 1979.

Due to her work on freshwater Chironomidae, Humphries was an authority on the taxonomy and ecology of this group in Ireland, publishing frequently in many academic journals including Proceedings of the Royal Irish Academy. During her tenure in UCD, she oversaw the move of the zoology department from the old Royal College of Science buildings on Merrion Street to the new Belfield campus in the 1960s, and the building of the now defunct marine field station at Coliemore Harbour. Humprhies was an active member of the UCD Women's Graduates’ Association, and during her time in UCD there was an unusually high number of female staff, with three other female professors within the faculty of science, and the zoology department being staffed entirely by women for a time. She was awarded a D.Sc. by UCD in 1952, and a member of the Royal Irish Academy (RIA) in 1950. She served on the RIA committee of science from 1955 to 1959, and was a contemporary of D. A. Webb, James M. O'Connor, and A. E. J. Went. Humphries was also a member of the Royal Dublin Society, the Institute of Biology of Ireland, and as an Irish representative to the International Society of Limnology and the English Freshwater Association. In 1957, when the British Association for the Advancement of Science convened in Dublin, Humphries was a member of the organising committee and edited the zoological section of the resulting handbook.

== Later life and legacy ==
Humphries is remembered as an entertaining lecturer, and funded some of the continued education of her department's technical staff personally. She was a sufferer of diabetes, the condition which hampered her later life. She died in San Remo Nursing Home, Bray, County Wicklow on 7 March 1986, and is buried at Glasnevin Cemetery. Zalutschia humphriesiae was named in her honour, and the UCD Carmel Humphries prize is awarded every year to the best zoology postgraduate research seminar. The Irish Biogeographical Society dedicated the 1999 issue of Bulletin of the Irish Biogeographical Society to her memory.
