= James Elser =

American ecologist (born 1959)

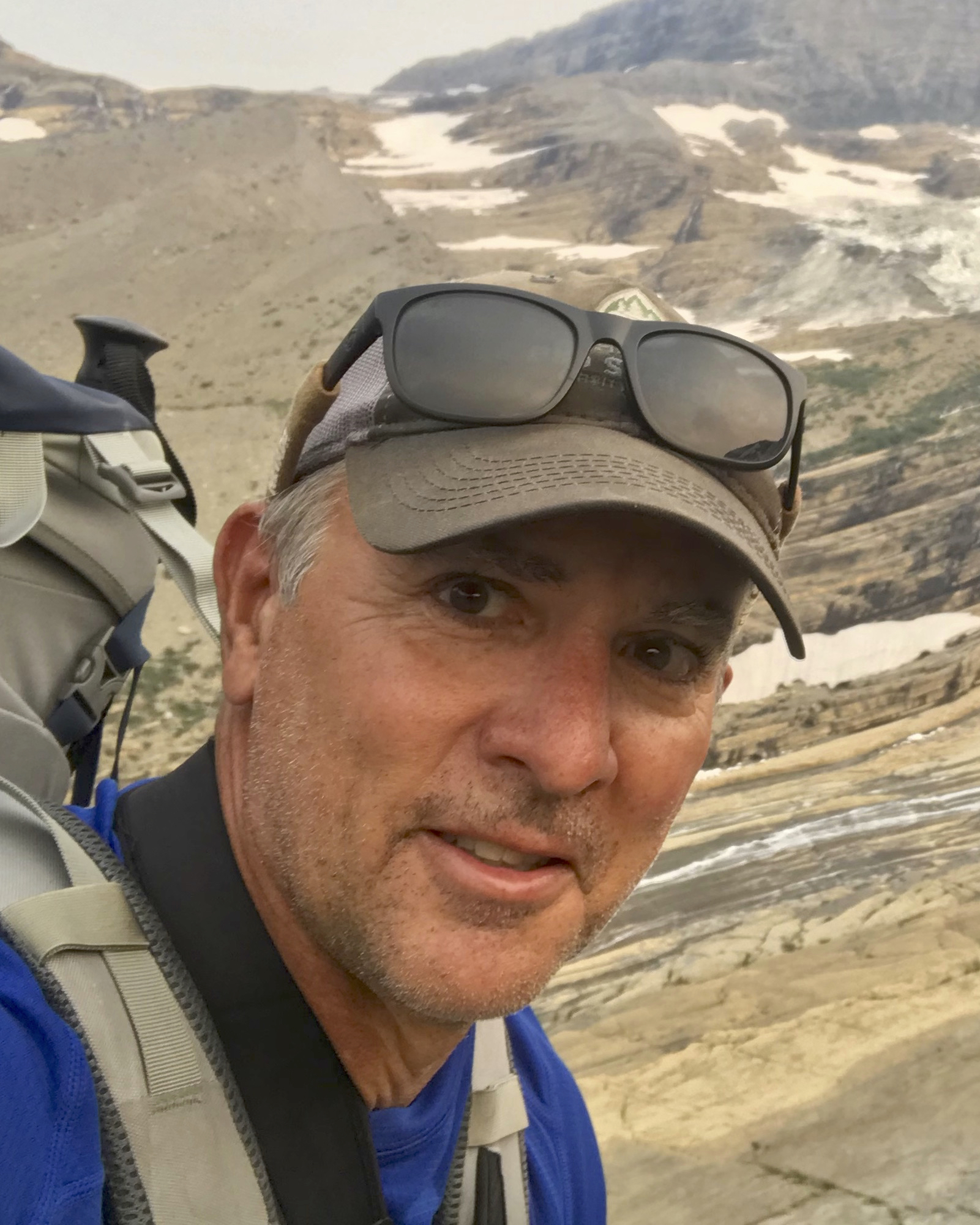
- Photo of James Elser
- Born: January 25, 1959 (age 67); Portland, Maine
- Education: University of Notre Dame (BS); University of Tennessee (MS); University of California-Davis (PhD)
- Awards: Raymond L. Lindeman Award (1990); G. Evelyn Hutchinson Award (2012)
- Scientific career
- Fields: Ecology; Limnology
- Workplaces: Arizona State University; University of Montana
- Thesis: Nutrients, algae, and grazers: complex interactions in lake ecosystems
- Doctoral advisor: Charles R. Goldman

James Elser is an American ecologist and limnologist. He is Director & Bierman Professor of Ecology, Flathead Lake Biological Station, University of Montana and research professor, School of Life Sciences, Arizona State University. He is known for his work in ecological stoichiometry. In 2019, he was elected to the National Academy of Sciences.

== Education ==
Elser earned a B.S. in biology in 1981 from the University of Notre Dame and an M.S. in ecology in 1983 from the University of Tennessee. He earned a Ph.D. in ecology at University of California-Davis in 1990 working with the limnologist Charles R. Goldman, producing a dissertation titled "Nutrients, algae, and grazers: complex interactions in lake ecosystems".

== Career ==
Elser was hired as an assistant professor at Arizona State University in 1990, where he advanced to Associate and Full Professor, and was named Regents' Professor in 2009. In 2016 he moved to University of Montana, where he directs the Flathead Lake Biological Station, while remaining a research professor at Arizona State. He served as president of the Association for the Sciences of Limnology and Oceanography from 2014 to 2016.

== Research ==
Elser's research focuses on ecological stoichiometry, how the balance of chemical elements affects ecological systems. Particular contributions include global analyses of the nutrient limitation of primary producers, the stoichiometry of nutrient recycling, and the linkage between the phosphorus and RNA content of organisms and their growth rate (the Growth Rate Hypothesis). This work is summarized in the 2002 book Ecological Stoichiometry, co-authored with Robert Sterner. Elser has also co-organized Woodstoich, a series of workshops on ecological stoichiometry for early career researchers. The sustainable use of phosphorus is a recent focus, as Director of the Sustainable Phosphorus Alliance

== Awards and distinctions ==
- 1990 Raymond L. Lindeman Award, Association for the Sciences of Limnology and Oceanography
- 2008 Fellow, American Association for the Advancement of Science
- 2012 G. Evelyn Hutchinson Award, Association for the Sciences of Limnology and Oceanography
- 2013 Foreign member, Norwegian Academy of Science and Letters
- 2019 Member, National Academy of Sciences USA.
