= G. Evelyn Hutchinson Award =

The G. Evelyn Hutchinson Award is an award granted annually by the Association for the Sciences of Limnology and Oceanography to a mid-career scientist for work accomplished during the preceding 5–10 years for excellence in any aspect of limnology or oceanography. The award is named in honor of the ecologist and limnologist G. Evelyn Hutchinson. Hutchinson requested that recipients of the award have made considerable contributions to knowledge, and that their future work promise a continuing legacy of scientific excellence.

== Awardees ==
Information about the award from Association for the Sciences of Limnology and Oceanography, unless otherwise noted with additional citations.

| Year | Recipient | Rationale |
|---|---|---|
| 1982 | Gene E. Likens | "A formal citation was not given for this first Award. Likens is best known for his long-term studies of acid rain, his long-term and collaborative research at Hubbard Brook on biogeochemical cycles in forested ecosystems, and for initiating and developing the Institute of Ecosystem Studies" |
| 1983 | John E. Hobbie | "who has caused a revolution in our understanding of the importance of bacteria in natural waters, including the water column and the benthos, from ponds and lakes to estuaries and oceans" |
| 1984 | Richard W. Eppley | "in recognition of contributions to our knowledge of the nitrogen and carbon cycles and plankton dynamics of the oceans" |
| 1985 | David W. Schindler | "for excellence in the field of chemical limnology, contributions to research on whole lake systems, and outstanding service as Director of the Canadian Experimental Lakes Area" |
| 1986 | Eville Gorham | "for his outstanding contributions to research in precipitation chemistry, limnology, and wetlands ecology" |
| 1987 | Lawrence R. Pomeroy | "in recognition of his clear thinking and leadership in studies of phosphorus and microbes in estuaries and oceans" |
| 1988 | Trevor Platt | "for outstanding contributions to developing the interface between the physics and biology of the ocean" |
| 1989 | Daniel A. Livingstone | "for his excellent record of research in limnology, paleolimnology, and paleoecology, focusing chiefly on Africa, though with a substantial component of study in North America" |
| 1990 | W. Thomas Edmondson | "in recognition of his work on aquatic population dynamics and community structure" |
| 1991 | Richard C. Dugdale | "in recognition of his work on nutrient uptake kinetics and his introduction of the concept of "new" and regenerated primary production" |
| 1992 | Robert G. Wetzel | "for studies of aquatic macrophytes, periphyton, and dissolved organic matter that have led to new understandings about the structure and function of lakes and wetland ecosystems" |
| 1993 | Timothy R. Parsons | "in recognition of his achievements in combining chemistry with biology to make the ocean's ecology more predictable" |
| 1994 | Peter A. Jumars | "for his outstanding work in biological oceanography, and particularly for his significant advances in understanding interactions among benthic organisms, sediments, and the physical environment" |
| 1995 | Farooq Azam | "in recognition of his seminal contributions to our knowledge of fundamental processes in the sea, and particularly for his central role in the development of the concept of the 'microbial loop'" |
| 1996 | Robert E. Hecky | "for outstanding contributions to the biogeochemistry of lakes and reservoirs in North America and Africa, and his leadership in collaborative research and syntheses across the basic-applied continuum" |
| 1997 | Bess B. Ward | "for pioneering applications of molecular methods to key conversions of nitrogen and methane, connecting per-cell rates within defined taxa to integrated rates in the field" |
| 1998 | David M. Karl | "for leadership in the fields of methods development, microbial ecology, molecular ecology and biogeochemistry, for analysis of whole ecosystems in the Pacific and Antarctic Oceans, and for exemplary teaching, mentoring and citizenship" |
| 1999 | Stephen R. Carpenter | "in recognition of his work in blending experiment, comparative study, modeling and innovative statistical analysis to unravel the complex interactions among community characteristics and ecosystem functions and, in doing so, building important bridges between fundamental limnology and issues in lake management" |
| 2000 | Paul Falkowski | "for his extensive contribution to understanding aquatic photosynthesis and nutrient uptake ranging from molecular mechanisms to global patterns of biogeochemical cycling" |
| 2001 | Carlos M. Duarte | "for significant contributions to the ecology of aquatic vegetation as well as creative, paradigm-challenging research on planktonic primary and secondary production across a range of aquatic environments" |
| 2002 | Louis Legendre | "for diverse contributions to quantification of aquatic ecological processes but in particular for cross-environment syntheses of hydrodynamic controls on phytoplankton production and carbon fluxes" |
| 2003 | Hans W. Paerl | "for contributing to understanding of aquatic microbial processes; for documenting linkages among the atmospheric deposition of nitrogen, coastal eutrophication, and harmful algal blooms; and for crossing traditional research boundaries delineating organism- to system-level perspectives within freshwater, estuarine and marine ecosystems" |
| 2004 | Bo Barker Jørgensen | "for outstanding contributions to the understanding of the biogeochemistry and microbial ecology of marine sediments, including development of new techniques, discovery of new organisms and metabolic pathways, and elucidation of the role of boundary layers; for the promotion of interdisciplinary approaches to benthic studies" |
| 2005 | Mary E. Power | "for her ground-breaking, synthetic work on river food webs and community ecology and innovative use of large-scale experiments, for her work on coupling between ecosystems, and for her active role in conservation biology" |
| 2006 | Jed A. Fuhrman | "for his development of the emergent field of microbial oceanography" |
| 2007 | John P. Smol | "for outstanding contributions and leadership in bridging paleolimnology with limnology, ecology, and the environmental sciences, as well as his seminal work on polar limnology and environmental change" |
| 2008 | Alice Alldredge | "for her work on marine snow which has and continues to revolutionize our understanding of particle flux and carbon cycling within the sea" |
| 2009 | Michael Pace | "for sustained and outstanding contributions to understanding of vertical fluxes in lakes and oceans, trophic cascades in planktonic and microbial systems, assessment of comparative and experimental approaches in aquatic ecology, and synthesis of the status and future directions of ecosystem ecology" |
| 2010 | Peter Dillon | "for his pioneering work in chemical limnology, including innovative research on eutrophication in lakes and long-term studies that have significantly advanced understanding of the responses of lakes and wetlands to acid deposition and climate change" |
| 2011 | Cindy Lee | "for her pioneering work in the transformation of particles as they are formed and pass through the depths of the sea" |
| 2012 | James Elser | "for his work on biological stoichiometry in both aquatic and terrestrial ecosystems and biota, and the use of evolutionary theory in understanding the organization from the molecule and cell to the ecosystem" |
| 2013 | Curtis A. Suttle | "for his pioneering, transformative and multi-faceted work in the field of marine virology" |
| 2014 | Gerhard Herndl | "for his exploration of microbial and biogeochemical processes in the dark ocean" |
| 2015 | Craig Carlson | "whose pioneering work accurately mapped DOC variation and linked it to the dynamics of microbial communities, establishing scientific concepts that are now considered vital to understanding the ocean carbon cycle and assessing its impact on future planetary health" |
| 2016 | Jack Middelburg | "for his pivotal contribution to the development of concepts and models incorporating the role of aquatic biota on carbon and nutrient cycling in aquatic ecosystems" |
| 2017 | Philip W. Boyd | "for his pioneering work on the complex interactions of biogeochemistry, climate change multiple drivers, and their impacts on ocean planktonic ecosystems" |
| 2018 | Emily Stanley | "for her outstanding and synthetic contributions to our understanding of the roles of hydrology and the biogeochemistry of nitrogen and carbon in lake and stream ecology" |
| 2019 | Oscar Schofield | "for transforming our understanding of the physical and chemical processes that govern marine phytoplankton physiology and ecology through the application of novel ocean observing tools, and for his skillful and enthusiastic leadership of the collaborative science necessary for addressing broad scale oceanographic challenges" |
| 2020 | Daniel Schindler | "for inspiring insight about ecosystem connectivity across the fresh to saltwater continuum and how climate and landscape drive ecosystem processes" |
| 2021 | Elena Litchman | "for pioneering the use of trait-based approaches to understand marine and freshwater phytoplankton community structure, biodiversity, and evolutionary ecology" |
| 2022 | Benjamin Van Mooy | "for his fundamental insights into phosphorus and lipid cycling in marine ecosystems, through innovative experimental and observational studies employing novel analytical techniques" |
| 2023 | John Dabiri | "for stretching the boundaries of aquatic science by demonstrating that the fluid dynamic lessons learned from planktonic organisms have broad applications, from undersea vehicles to wind turbines." |
| 2024 | Elizabeth Kujawinski | "for her groundbreaking research in marine chemistry and marine metabolomics and her unwavering commitment to service and leadership in the ocean science community." |
| 2025 | Daniel Smale | " for his far-reaching work on marine heatwaves and their impact on marine biodiversity and conservation, bridging basic and applied research, as well as his leadership and commitment to policy and science communication." |
| 2026 | Debbie Lindell | "for pioneering contributions to our understanding of the role of viruses in shaping marine microbial ecology, revealing the choreography of host–virus interactions from single cells to entire ocean basins." |

== See also ==
- List of oceanography awards
