= Robert G. Wetzel =

American limnologist and ecologist (1936–2005)

- Born: 16 August 1936; Ann Arbor, Michigan, U.S.
- Died: 18 April 2005 (aged 68)
- Education: University of California, Davis
- Spouse: Carol Wetzel
- Awards: Honorary Doctor of Philosophy, University of Uppsala (1984) Fellow of the AAAS Tage Erlander National Professor of Sweden (1982-1983)
- Scientific career
- Fields: Limnology, Ecology
- Thesis: A comparative study of the primary productivity of higher aquatic plants, periphyton, and phytoplankton in a saline lake (1962)
- Doctoral advisor: Charles Goldman

Robert George Wetzel (16 August 1936 – 18 April 2005) was an American limnologist and ecologist, a specialist in freshwater ecology, chemistry, and environmental protection. Wetzel served as the general secretary and treasurer of the International Association of Theoretical and Applied Limnology for 37 years in addition to his tenure as president of the American Society of Limnology and Oceanography (1980–1981).

== Early life and education ==
Wetzel was born in Ann Arbor, Michigan on August 16, 1936. His parents, William Wetzel and Eugenia Wetzel, were recent German immigrants. He earned his Ph.D. from the University of California Davis under the advisorship of Charles Goldman.

== Academic career and impact ==
After graduating from UC Davis, Wetzel became an assistant professor in 1965, then a professor in 1971 at Michigan State University. In 1986, he became a professor of biology at the University of Michigan. In 1990 he became the Bishop Professor of Biology at the University of Alabama. In 2001 he joined the Department of Environmental Sciences at the University of North Carolina Chapel Hill and there became the William R. Kenan Jr. Professor in 2003.

Wetzel authored at least 20 books and over 400 peer-reviewed articles in his scientific career, including the authoritative textbook "Limnology : lake and river ecosystems". The first edition was published in 1975 while Wetzel was a professor at Michigan State University. Subsequent editions were published in 1983 and 2001. This latter edition has been deemed his "masterpiece", an "established classic text", and "an amazing contribution".

As a professor at four different universities, Wetzel served as an advisor to 39 graduate students, as well as serving on an array of committees and scientific journal editorial boards.

Wetzel died in April 2005, at the age of 68.

== Honors ==
- Honorary Doctor of Philosophy, University of Uppsala (1984)
- Fellow of the AAAS
- Tage Erlander National Professor of Sweden (1982–1983)
- G. Evelyn Hutchinson Medal (1992)
- Baldi Memorial Award (1989)
- Einar Naumann-August Thienemann Medal (1992)
- Society of Wetland Scientists Lifetime Achievement Award (2000)
- UC Davis Award of Distinction (1988)
- Burnum Distinguished Faculty Award (1994)
- Russian Academy of Sciences Aquatic Ecologist of Year 2002
- Hutchinson Science Laureate Award (2005)
