= Philip A. Cochran =

American biologist

Philip A. Cochran (1955 – 2015) was an American biologist who worked as a professor at St. Norbert College in De Pere, Wisconsin (1984 – 2000), and St. Mary’s University of Minnesota (2000 – 2015).

Cochran earned a B.A. in Biology and Environmental Science at St. Mary’s University of Minnesota in 1977 (with high honors), an M.S. in Fisheries Science from the University of Minnesota in 1980, and a PhD in Zoology from University of Wisconsin in 1984, where at the Center for Limnology he first studied lampreys, the group of animals that would become his specialty.

While best known as a leading Lamprey specialist, Cochran published hundreds of articles in refereed and non-refereed publications, as well as numerous book chapters, book reviews, and notes. He conducted much of his fieldwork in Wisconsin and Minnesota, and his research focused on a wide variety of fishes, amphibians, and reptiles of the upper Midwest. With John Lyons and Don Fago, Cochran coauthored the book Wisconsin Fishes 2000: Status and Distribution, which provided an updated overview of the status and abundance of fishes in Wisconsin.

In 1991, during a sabbatical, he journeyed to central Mexico to help carry out the first comprehensive studies of the distribution, status, morphology, and ecology of the threatened non-parasitic Jacona lamprey and the endangered parasitic Chapala lamprey. In addition to his lamprey research, Cochran also collaborated with UW-Madison, St. Norbert, and Notre Dame researchers on the “Cascade” food-web project at the University of Notre Dame Ecological Research Center in the Michigan Upper Peninsula. Later in his career, Cochran extended his research interests into the historical, dealing with such subjects as captive timber rattlesnakes in Minnesota’s early history, rattlesnake bounties in Minnesota, the historical use of willow cats as bait in the Upper Mississippi River, and using newspapers as sources of historical information about lake sturgeon.
