= Daniel A. Livingstone =

Daniel Archibald Livingstone (3 August 1927 – 6 March 2016) was the James B Duke Professor Emeritus and research professor, in the Department of Biology at Duke University, Durham, North Carolina. Born in Detroit, Michigan, Livingstone studied at McGill and Dalhousie Universities before joining Ed Deevey's research group as a PhD student at Yale University.

His research primarily addressed issues of historical ecology, including lake ontogeny, forest history, fish biogeography, palynology, Quaternary bioclimatology, and the paleolimnology of African lakes.

He was the inventor of the Livingstone corer, widely used by American palynologists and paleolimnologists. In 1989, he was awarded the G. Evelyn Hutchinson Award by the American Society of Limnology and Oceanography.

He died March 6, 2016.

== Selected publications ==
- Livingstone, D.A. 1950–51. The freshwater fishes on Nova Scotia. Proceedings of the Nova Scotia Institute of Science 23: 1-90.
- Livingstone, D.A. 1957. On the sigmoid growth phase in the history of Linsley Pond. American Journal of Science 255: 364–373.
- Livingstone, D.A., Bryan, K., Jr., and Leahy, R.G. 1958. Effects of an arctic environment on the origin and development of freshwater lakes. Limnology and Oceanography 3: 192–214.
- Livingstone, D.A., and Livingstone, B.G.R. 1958. Late-glacial and postglacial vegetation from Gillis Lake in Richmond County, Cape Breton Island, Nova Scotia. American Journal of Science 256: 341–359.
- Livingstone, D.A., and Boykin, J.C. 1962. Vertical distribution of Phosphorus in Linsley Pond mud. Limnology and Oceanography 7: 57–62.
- Livingstone, D.A. 1968. Some interstadial and postglacial pollen diagrams from eastern Canada. Ecological Monographs 38: 87–125.
- Stager, J.C., Reinthal, R.N., and Livingstone, D.A. 1986. A 25, 000-year history for Lake Victoria, East Africa, and some comments on its significance for the evolution of cichlid fishes. Freshwater Biology 16: 15–19.
- Livingstone, D.A. 1998. An historical view of African Inland waters, in Science in Africa: Emerging Water Management Issues, edited by J. Schoneboom, pp. 1–11, Washington, DC: AAAS .
- Livingstone, D.A. 1999. Historical geochemistry of tropical Africa, SIL. Verh. Internat. Verein Limnol., 27: 27-34 (Kilham Memorial Lecture.)
- Livingstone, D.A. 2001. A geological perspective on the conservation of African forests, in African Rain Forest Ecology and Conservation, p. 50-56, edited by W. Weber, L.J.T. White, A. Vedder, and L. Naughton-Treves, Yale University Press, New Haven and London.
