= T. T. Macan =

British freshwater zoologist

Thomas Townley Macan (12 September 1910 – 12 January 1985; known to many as "Kit", "Kitten" or "T.T.M.") was a British freshwater zoologist (limnologist), field studies director and author. He had a particular interest in freshwater invertebrates.

He was brought up in southwest England, and educated at Wellington College, Berkshire and Christ's College, Cambridge. Although best known for his work in freshwater biology, his first job (1933–34) was on a scientific expedition to the Indian Ocean. The resulting volume on starfish (Asteroidea) became part of his PhD thesis. He was awarded his doctorate in 1940.

In 1935, he joined the Freshwater Biological Association (FBA). He worked there until his retirement in 1976, broken only by military service during World War II. In 1941, he was commissioned as Lieutenant into the Royal Army Medical Corps,; he subsequently rose to the rank of Major; he addressed problems relating to malaria in Iraq, Iran, India and Burma. In 1946, he returned to the FBA as Deputy Director.

His earliest work at the FBA was concerned with Corixidae (water boatmen) and gastropods. He then concentrated on a detailed taxonomic study of the British Ephemeroptera (mayflies), culminating in the publication in 1961 of the first complete guide to their nymphs (most recent edition 1979). During this work, he accumulated much information on the ecology of the various species, especially their habitats and life cycles. His principal locations of study were in Ford Wood Beck, a small stony stream near his home in Outgate near Hawkshead, Cumbria; and in Hodson's Tarn, a moorland lake close to the Windermere Laboratory of the FBA. After his retirement, he continued his studies in the River Lune, which runs through Cumbria and Lancashire. He was a prolific author of scientific papers and books; his Life in Lakes and Rivers (co-authored with E. B. Worthington) was at one time a set text in the Open University.

In addition to the teaching he did at the LBA, he was visiting lecturer at Lancaster University (1966–76) and the University of Toulouse (1968), and visiting professor at Idaho State University (1972) and Ohio University (1976–77). He was the founding editor (1971–73) of the journal Freshwater Biology. He was closely associated with the International Association of Theoretical and Applied Limnology, in which he served as General Secretary and Treasurer (1953–68), Editor (1953–62) and Vice-President (1968–72).

Among his outside interests, he was a keen sailor.

== Selected bibliography ==
- 1951: Life in Lakes and Rivers (with E. B. Worthington). New Naturalist #15. Collins, London.
- 1956: A Revised Key to the British Water Bugs (Hemiptera-Heteroptera). Freshwater Biological Association, Ambleside, UK.
- 1959: A Guide to Freshwater Invertebrate Animals. Longman, London.
- 1960: A Key to the British Species of Crustacea: Malacostraca Occurring in Freshwater: With Notes on Their Ecology and Distribution (with H. B. N. Hynes and W. D. Williams). Freshwater Biological Association, Ambleside, UK.
- 1967: Key to the British Species of Freshwater Cladocera (with David Joseph Scourfield).
- 1970: Biological Studies of the English Lakes. Prentice Hall, London. ISBN 978-0582460195
- 1973: Key to the Adults of the British Trichoptera. Freshwater Biological Association, Ambleside, UK. ISBN 978-0900386190
- 1973: Ponds and Lakes. Allen & Unwin. ISBN 9780045740123
- 1974: Freshwater Ecology. John Wiley & Sons. ISBN 978-0470561492
- 1977: A Key to the British Fresh and Brackish Water Gastropods. Freshwater Biological Association, Ambleside, UK. ISBN 978-0900386053
- 1979: A Key to the Nymphs of the British Species of Ephemeroptera: With Notes on Their Ecology. Freshwater Biological Association, Ambleside, UK. ISBN 978-0900386350
- 1982: The Study of Stoneflies, Mayflies and Caddis Flies. The Amateur Entomologists' Society. ISBN 978-0900054358
- 1988: Larvae of the British Ephemeroptera: A Key with Ecological Notes (with J. M. Elliott and U. H. Humpesch). Freshwater Biological Association, Ambleside, UK. ISBN 978-0900386473
