= Maria Rosa Miracle Solé =

Spanish ecologist (1945–2017)

Maria Rosa Miracle
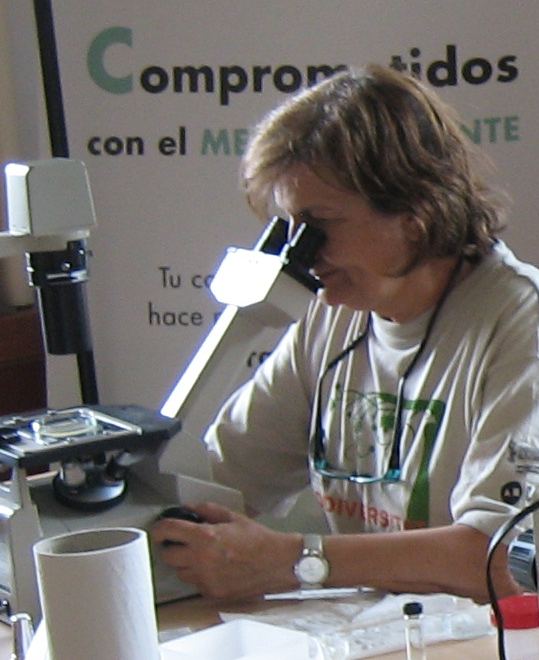
- Miracle in 2009
- Born: June 2, 1945; Barcelona, Spain
- Died: May 28, 2017 (aged 71)
- Known for: Ecology, limnology, biodiversity, taxonomy
- Scientific career
- Institutions: Universitat de Barcelona; Universitat de València

Maria Rosa Miracle Solé (Barcelona, 2 June 1945 – 28 May 2017) was a Catalan biologist, who held a Professor Emeritus of Ecology at the University of Valencia and a PhD in ecology from the University of Barcelona. Her research focused on the study of biodiversity, ecology, integrative taxonomy and biogeography of aquatic organisms.

She obtained the first chair in ecology awarded to a woman in Spain.

== Biography ==
She was born on 2 June 1945 in the city of Barcelona. She studied biology at the University of Barcelona, where in 1974 she obtained her doctorate with a cum laude qualification, under the direction of the ecologist Ramon Margalef. She then worked at the University of Barcelona as a professor until 1979. Subsequently, she joined the University of Valencia as a professor in the Microbiology and Ecology Department, where she founded the limnology research group. She was the first woman to become a Chair of Ecology in Spain in 1981.

She stood out as one of the main figures in limnology in Spain and she was the president of the Iberian Limnology Association from 1993 to 2002. She worked as a Professor until her retirement in September 2015, when she continued as Emeritus professor at the University of Valencia. She died on 28 May 2017.

== Research ==
Her research covered a diverse array of topics in basic and applied limnology. She worked on biodiversity, ecology, integrative taxonomy, and biogeography of aquatic organisms (including bacteria, phytoplankton, zooplankton, and benthos). She also studied the dynamics of vertical migrations of planktonic populations, aquatic ecosystems functioning and dynamics, paleolimnology and global change. In terms of applied research, she conducted studies on eutrophication, pollution, ecotoxicology, and also conservation and management of aquatic ecosystems.

Her willingness to collaborate with other researchers around the world and her naturalistic interest in aquatic invertebrate species led to descriptions of new species for science that were named by specialists who recognized her efforts. This is the case of Anuraeopsis miracleae Koste, 1991 and the copepod Eucyclops miracleae Alekseev, 2010.

She published nearly two hundred articles in prestigious international journals, and more than 20 book chapters, edited or co-edited five volumes, and authored or co-authored two scientific books. During her career she supervised more than 20 doctoral students. Her first scientific article was published in Treballs de la Societat Catalana de Biologia in 1971, and it focused on zooplankton of the Lake Banyoles. These results were also included in her first scientific book. Part of her PhD thesis was published in 1974 in the journal Ecology, and has been cited in Ecology books. The naturalistic emphasis of her research is reflected in the importance of her research to different aspects of the ecology, biodiversity and biogeography of the organisms she studied, even in recent times, when she carried out detailed phylogenetic and taxonomic studies of planktonic invertebrates.

Miracle was also interested in disseminating science, publishing popular articles and books on various topics in ecology, such as the one in Science of the collection Temas Clave of the Salvat publishing house.

== Honors, awards, and distinctions ==
The Iberian Association of Limnology (AIL) honored her scientific trajectory in a special session at the XVIII Conference of AIL held in Tortosa in 2016. The scientific journal Limnetica dedicated two special volumes to her scientific contributions.
