= Lawrence R. Pomeroy =

American zoologist, ecologist, and oceanographer (1925–2020)

Lawrence Richards Pomeroy (June 2, 1925, Sayre, Pennsylvania – March 26, 2020, Burlington, North Carolina) was an American zoologist, ecologist, and oceanographer.

== Biography ==
His family lived in Watkins Glen, New York, until they moved in the mid-1930s to Pass-a-Grille, Florida. As a high school student at St. Petersburg High School, he wrote a nature column for the local newspaper and worked as a crew member of the commercial fishing boat Wye Goodie. At the University of Michigan he graduated in zoology with a B.S. in 1947 and an M.S. in 1948. At Rutgers University he received in 1951 a Ph.D. in marine science. His doctoral dissertation on the physiology of oysters was supervised by Harold Haley "Hal" Haskin (1915–2002). As a postdoc Pomeroy worked at New Jersey's Oyster Research Laboratory (later renamed the Haskin Shellfish Research Laboratory). From 1954 to 1960 he worked at the University of Georgia Marine Institute, located on Sapelo Island and founded in 1953. In 1960 he became a faculty member in the University of Georgia's zoology department and moved with his family to Athens, Georgia.

Robert E. Johannes (1936–2002) and Pomeroy planned and led the 1971 Symbios Expedition to Enewetak Atoll in the Marshall Islands. The expedition lasted two months. The research vessel R/V Alpha Helix and shore-based facilities provided laboratory and logistical support. During the expedition the research vessel was docked at a pier located on Japtan Island in the Marshall Islands. The expedition, with an interdisciplinary crew of 25 ecologists and oceanographers, set a new standard for comprehensive study of a coral reef.

In April 1952 in New Jersey, he married Janet Klerk (1929–2009). Upon his death he was survived by his daughter, his son, and three grandchildren.

== Awards and honors ==
- 1958 — Fellow of the American Association for the Advancement of Science
- 1969 — Antarctica Service Medal from the National Science Foundation
- 1983–1984 — President of the Association for the Sciences of Limnology and Oceanography
- 1987 — G. Evelyn Hutchinson Award from the Association for the Sciences of Limnology and Oceanography
- 1989 — A.G. Huntsman Award for Excellence in the Marine Sciences from the Royal Society of Canada
- 2001 — Odum Lifetime Achievement Award from the Coastal and Estuarine Research Federation (CERF)

== Selected publications ==
- Pomeroy, Lawrence R. (1959). "Algal Productivity in Salt Marshes of Georgia". Limnology and Oceanography. 4 (4): 386–397. Bibcode:1959LimOc...4..386P. doi:10.4319/lo.1959.4.4.0386. ISSN 0024-3590.
- —— (1960). "Residence Time of Dissolved Phosphate in Natural Waters". Science. 131 (3415): 1731–1732. Bibcode:1960Sci...131.1731P. doi:10.1126/science.131.3415.1731. ISSN 0036-8075. PMID 17796425. S2CID 34778159.
- ——; Johannes, R.E. (1968). "Occurrence and respiration of ultraplankton in the upper 500 meters of the ocean". Deep Sea Research and Oceanographic Abstracts. 15 (3): 381–391. Bibcode:1968DSRA...15..381P. doi:10.1016/0011-7471(68)90014-4. ISSN 0011-7471.
- —— (1970). "The Strategy of Mineral Cycling". Annual Review of Ecology and Systematics. 1: 171–190. doi:10.1146/annurev.es.01.110170.001131.
- Johannes, R. E.; Alberts, J.; d'Elia, C.; Kinzie, R. A.; ——; Sottile, W.; Wiebe, W.; Marsh, J. A.; Helfrich, P.; Maragos, J.; Meyer, J.; Smith, S.; Crabtree, D.; Roth, A.; McCloskey, L. R.; Betzer, S.; Marshall, N.; Pilson, M. E. Q.; Telek, G.; Clutter, R. I.; Dupaul, W. D.; Webb, K. L.; Wells, J. M. (1972). "The Metabolism of Some Coral Reef Communities: A Team Study of Nutrient and Energy Flux at Eniwetok". BioScience. 22 (9): 541–543. doi:10.2307/1296314. JSTOR 1296314.
- —— (1974). "The Ocean's Food Web, A Changing Paradigm". BioScience. 24 (9): 499–504. doi:10.2307/1296885. JSTOR 1296885. (over 1500 citations)
- ——; Darley, W. M.; Dunn, E. L.; Gallagher, J. L.; Haines, E. B.; Whitney, D. M. (1981). "Primary Production". The Ecology of a Salt Marsh. Ecological Studies. Vol. 38. pp. 39–67. doi:10.1007/978-1-4612-5893-3_3. ISBN 978-1-4612-5895-7.
- Pace, M. L.; Glasser, J. E.; —— (1984). "A simulation analysis of continental shelf food webs". Marine Biology. 82: 47–63. doi:10.1007/BF00392763. S2CID 84635545.
- ——; Deibel, D. (1986). "Temperature Regulation of Bacterial Activity During the Spring Bloom in Newfoundland Coastal Waters". Science. 233 (4761): 359–361. Bibcode:1986Sci...233..359P. doi:10.1126/science.233.4761.359. PMID 17737625. S2CID 8467119.
- ——; Wiebe, William J. (1988). "Energetics of microbial food webs". Hydrobiologia. 159: 7–18. doi:10.1007/BF00007363. S2CID 24756863.
- ——; Macko, S. A.; Ostrom, P. H.; Dunphy, Janet (1990). "The microbial food web in Arctic seawater: Concentration of dissolved free amino acids and bacterial abundance and activity in the Arctic Ocean and in Resolute Passage". Marine Ecology Progress Series. 61 (1/2): 31–40. Bibcode:1990MEPS...61...31P. doi:10.3354/meps061031. JSTOR 24842245.
- —— (1991). "Status and Future Needs of Marine Ecology". Protozoa and Their Role in Marine Processes. pp. 475–492. doi:10.1007/978-3-642-73181-5_27. ISBN 978-3-642-73183-9.
- Wiebe, W. J.; Sheldon, W. M.; —— (1992). "Bacterial growth in the cold: evidence for an enhanced substrate requirement". Applied and Environmental Microbiology. 58 (1): 359–364.
- ——; Sheldon, Joan E.; Sheldon, Wade M.; Peters, Francesc (1995). "Limits to growth and respiration of bacterioplankton in the Gulf of Mexico". Marine Ecology Progress Series. 117 (1/3): 259–268. Bibcode:1995MEPS..117..259P. doi:10.3354/meps117259. JSTOR 44634837.
- ——; Wiebe, WJ (2001). "Temperature and substrates as interactive limiting factors for marine heterotrophic bacteria". Aquatic Microbial Ecology. 23: 187–204. doi:10.3354/ame023187.
- ——; LeB. Williams, Peter J.; Azam, Farooq; Hobbie, John E. (2007). "The Microbial Loop". Oceanography. 20 (2): 28–33. doi:10.5670/oceanog.2007.45. JSTOR 24860040.

=== as editor ===
- Pomeroy, L. R.; Wiegert, R. G., eds. (6 December 2012). The Ecology of a Salt Marsh. Springer. ISBN 9781461258933; pbk reprint of 1981 1st edition
- ——; Alberts, James J., eds. (6 December 2012). Concepts of Ecosystem Ecology: A Comparative View. Springer. ISBN 9781461238423; pbk reprint of 1988 1st edition
