= Debbie Lindell =

Microbiologist

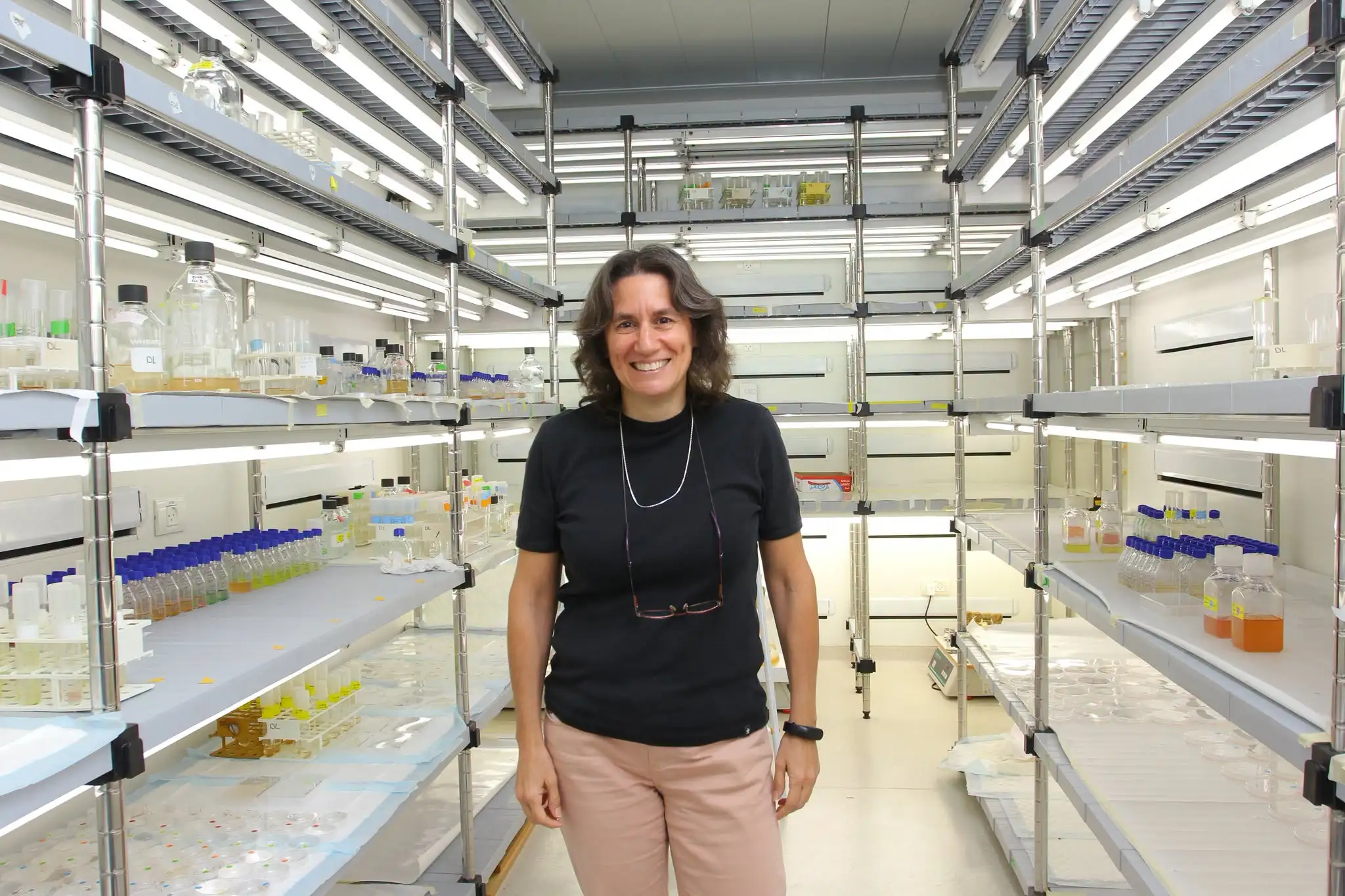
- Debbie Lindell in culture room
- Born: Melbourne, Australia
- Education: Hebrew University of Jerusalem
- Awards: G. Evelyn Hutchinson Award Elected member of EMBO
- Scientific career
- Workplaces: Technion – Israel Institute of Technology
- Thesis: Assessing the nitrogen status of marine prokaryotic phytoplankton using molecular methods (2000)

Debbie Lindell (Hebrew: דבי לינדל) is the Dresner Chair in Life Sciences and Medicine Professor at the Technion - Israel Institute of Technology in the Faculty of Biology. She is known for her work on the interactions between viruses and their hosts in marine environments.

== Education ==
Lindell was born in Australia and grew up loving the ocean. Lindell earned her B.Sc. from Hebrew University of Jerusalem. She then worked as a technician on a project involving coral reef and fish and decided she wanted to pursue research in marine science. She went on to earn an M.Sc. and a Ph.D. from Hebrew University of Jerusalem, followed by postdoctoral research at Massachusetts Institute of Technology with Sallie W. Chisholm.

== Research ==
Lindell's early research was on the succession of phytoplankton in the Gulf of Aqaba and nitrogen-related gene expression by the cyanobacterium Synechococcus. to assess their nitrogen physiology in the ocean. Her subsequent work examined the transfer of genes between phytoplankton and marine viruses, and the evolution of host-virus interactions as evident from the analysis of gene expression in bacteria infected by a virus. Her research also investigates the genetic factors leading to resistance and long-term coexistence of phytoplankton and viruses. In more recent work Lindell’s team developed a genetic system for cyanophages to investigate the functional benefit of viral genes, including those horizontally acquired from cellular organisms. Lindell’s team also developed single-virus and single-cell methods to measure cyanophage abundance and infection patterns to assess their impact on cyanobacterial communities in the ocean. In response to the COVID-19 disease, Lindell was part of a team who filed a patent for a reusable mask that is designed to prevent infection by viruses. As of 2026, Lindell has an h-index of 38 with over 9000 citations to her published works.

== Selected publications ==
- Lindell, Debbie; Post, Anton F. (September 1995). "Ultraphytoplankton succession is triggered by deep winter mixing in the Gulf of Aqaba (Eilat), Red Sea". Limnology and Oceanography. 40 (6): 1130–1141. Bibcode:1995LimOc..40.1130L. doi:10.4319/lo.1995.40.6.1130. ISSN 0024-3590.
- Lindell, Debbie; Penno, S.; Al-Qutob, M.; David, E.; Korpal, T.; Lazar, B.; Post, Anton F. (November 2005). "Expression of the nitrogen stress response gene ntcA reveals nitrogen sufficient Synechococcus populations in the oligotrophic northern Red Sea". Limnology and Oceanography. 50 (6): 1932–1944. Bibcode:2005LimOc..50.1932L. doi:10.4319/lo.2005.50.6.1932. ISSN 0024-3590.
- Lindell, Debbie; Jaffe, Jacob D.; Johnson, Zackary I.; Church, George M.; Chisholm, Sallie W. (November 2005). "Photosynthesis genes in marine viruses yield proteins during host infection". Nature. 438 (7064): 86–89. Bibcode:2005Natur.438...86L. doi:10.1038/nature04111. PMID 16222247. S2CID 4347406.
- Lindell, Debbie; Jaffe, Jacob D.; Coleman, Maureen L.; Futschik, Matthias E.; Axmann, Ilka M.; Rector, Trent; Kettler, Gregory; Sullivan, Matthew B.; Steen, Robert; Hess, Wolfgang R.; Church, George M.; Chisholm, Sallie W. (September 2007). "Genome-wide expression dynamics of a marine virus and host reveal features of co-evolution". Nature. 449 (7158): 83–86. Bibcode:2007Natur.449...83L. doi:10.1038/nature06130. PMID 17805294. S2CID 4412265.
- Avrani, Sarit; Wurtzel, Omri; Sharon, Itai; Sorek, Rotem; Lindell, Debbie (June 2011). "Genomic island variability facilitates Prochlorococcus–virus coexistence". Nature. 474 (7353): 604–608. Bibcode:2011Natur.474..604A. doi:10.1038/nature10172. ISSN 0028-0836. PMID 21720364. S2CID 205225328.
- Zborowsky, Sophia; Lindell, Debbie (August 2019). "Resistance in marine cyanobacteria differs against specialist and generalist cyanophages". Proceedings of the National Academy of Sciences. 116 (34): 16899–16908. Bibcode:2019PNAS..11616899Z. doi:10.1073/pnas.1906897116. ISSN 0027-8424. PMC 6708340. PMID 31383764.
- Carlson, Michael C. G.; Ribalet, François; Maidanik, Ilia; Durham, Bryndan P.; Hulata, Yotam; Ferrón, Sara; et al. (April 2022). "Viruses affect picocyanobacterial abundance and biogeography in the North Pacific Ocean". Nature Microbiology. 7 (4): 570–580. Bibcode:2022NatMb...7..570C. doi:10.1038/s41564-022-01088-x. ISSN 2058-5276. PMC 8975747. PMID 35365792.
- Nadel, Omer; Hanna, Rawad; Rozenberg, Andrey; Shitrit, Dror; Tahan, Ran; Pekarsky, Irena; et al. (November 2025). "Viral NblA proteins negatively affect oceanic cyanobacterial photosynthesis". Nature. 648 (8093): 434–442. Bibcode:2025Natur.648..434N. doi:10.1038/s41586-025-09656-x. PMC 12695635. PMID 41224996.

== Awards and honors ==
In 2007 Lindell was awarded the Yigal Alon Fellowship by the Israel Council for Higher Education. In 2009 Lindell received the Krill Prize for scientific excellence from the Wolf Foundation. In 2022 Lindell received the “Morton and Beverley Rechler” Prize for Excellence in Research. Lindell received the G. Evelyn Hutchinson Award from the Association for the Sciences of Limnology and Oceanography in 2026. Lindell is an elected fellow of both the European and American Academies of Microbiology (EAM and AAM) and an elected member of the European Molecular Biology Organization (EMBO).
