= Freshwater Biological Association =

British scientific research organization

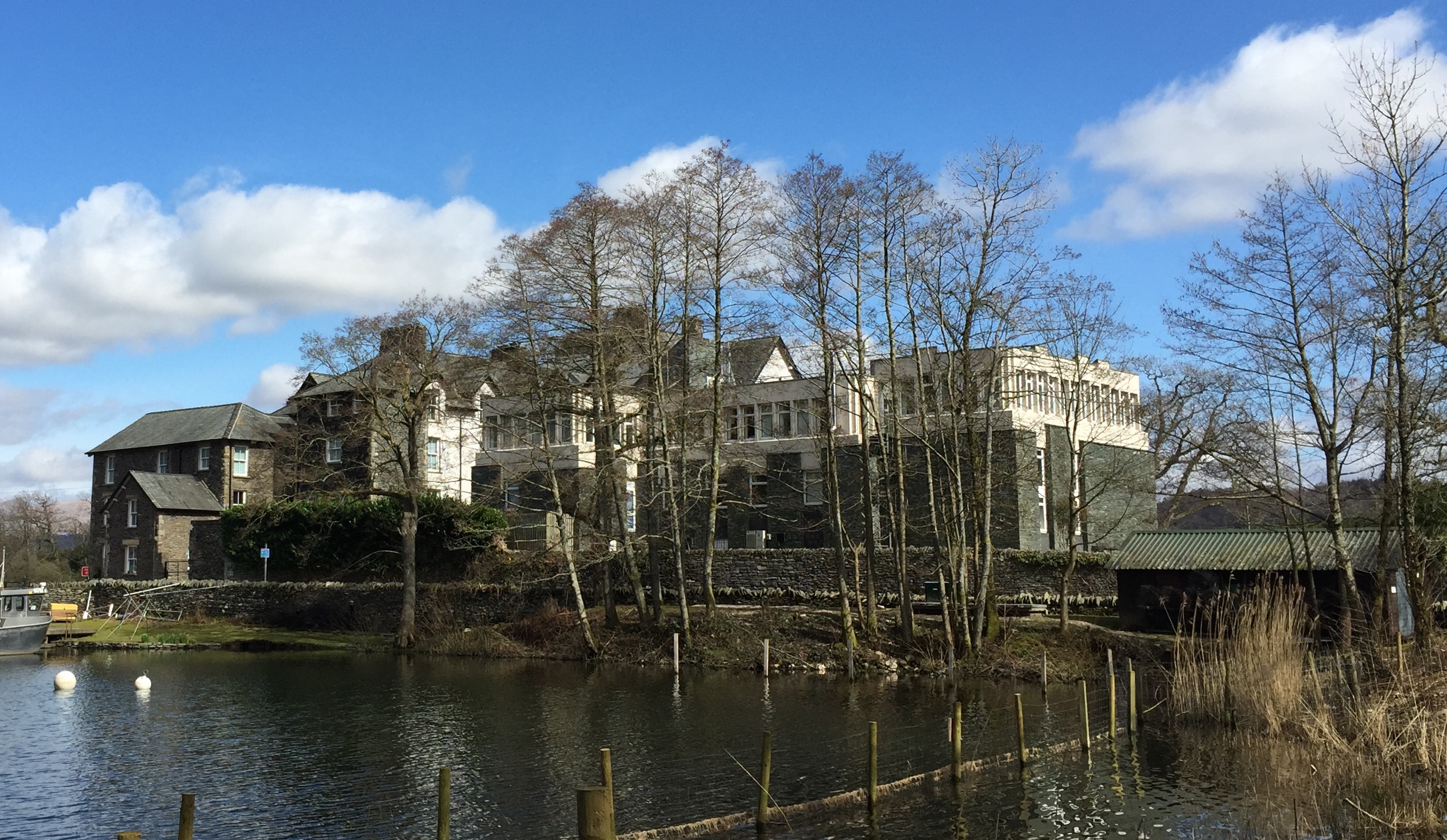
Freshwater Biological Association building (1950–2021) in Claife, on the shore of Windermere

The Freshwater Biological Association (FBA) is an independent scientific organisation founded in 1929 in Cumbria by Felix Eugen Fritsch, William Harold Pearsall, Francis Balfour-Browne, and Robert Gurney among others. Whilst originally created to be a research station it has evolved into a learned society whose mission is "to promote the sustainable management of freshwater ecosystems and resources, using the best available science". It works closely alongside other organisations, notably Natural Environment Research Council. The FBA promotes freshwater science through innovative research, maintained specialist scientific facilities, a programme of scientific meetings, production of publications, and by providing sound independent scientific opinion.

As of 2010, the FBA hosted both published and unpublished collections, two specialist libraries and varieties of long term data sets from sites of scientific significance. It is managed by the Chief Executive who was assisted by 25 staff (17 full-time equivalents). By year ending 31 March 2020, the number had fallen to 15 employees, 6 trustees and 3 volunteers.

A board of trustees, elected by the members, guide the strategic direction of the Association in line with the charitable objectives. The FBA is a registered charity, number 214440 and a company limited by guarantee, registration number 263162, England.

== Activities ==
The FBA is involved in many activities which include the support of Science through the use of its location in The Lake District in Cumbria and alongside the River Frome, East Stoke in Dorset and uses its location to support scientific work by providing specialist facilities and equipment. It is also involved in research through grants and studentships given to young scientists, and has made provisions for information services, from its freshwater libraries, to its information collection titled "FreshwaterLife", to its reference collection "The Fritsch Collection". Finally, many publications and analysis guides are also published by the FBA, with records of freshwater information.

The FBA also runs many meetings and courses for specialism in freshwater biology, holding an Annual Scientific Meeting.

In September 2008 the FBA launched a series of conferences in aquatic biology. The first of these was entitled "Multiple Stressors in Freshwater Ecosystems". The second, in April 2010, had the theme of "Integrated Catchment Management".

== Notable scientists ==
- Clifford H. Mortimer (1911–2010) Worked from 1935 conducting chemical analysis of lake water and then after the war as physical limnologist
- Patricia H. Clarke (1919–2010) Position of responsibility after retirement.
- Rosemary Lowe-McConnell (1921–2014) various projects aimed at producing wartime food from fresh waters.
- John Walter Guerrier Lund, career with FBA from 1944 to 2005.
- Charles Oldham (naturalist) (1868–1942) served on the council
- Winifred Pennington (1915–2007) pioneered the study of paleolimnology there.
- Winifred Frost (1902–1979) worked there from 1938 to 1979. Her bequest to them funded postgraduate scholarships
- Charlotte Kipling (1919–1992) A statistician working there from 1947, some publications shared with Frost.
- Steve Ormerod, a past member of the council.
- T. T. Macan (1910–1985), career there 1935–1976, latterly as deputy director.
- Eville Gorham (1925–2020) Researcher from 1954 to 1957 regarding acid rain and nuclear fallout.

=== Senior officers ===
The FBA's Council Chairs have included Cecil Terence Ingold from 1965 to 1974 and Gordon Elliott Fogg (1919–2005) from 1974 to 1985.

Presidents have included Sir John Gray (1918–2011) from 1983 to 1987, Sir Frederick George Thomas Holliday (1935–2016) from 1995 to 2002, Sir Martin Holgate (b.1931) from 2002 to 2017, and Professor Louise Heathwaite from 2017 to 2022.

Directors have included E. Barton Worthington, secretary to and first full–time director of the Freshwater Biological Association from 1937 to 1946.
