= Einar Naumann =

Swedish botanist and limnologist

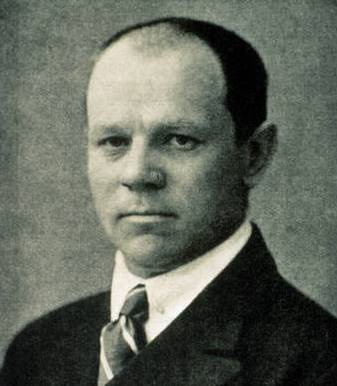
Einar Naumann

Einar Christian Leonard Naumann (13 August 1891 – 22 September 1934) was a Swedish botanist and limnologist who was professor of limnology at the University of Lund. Naumann worked during the summers at the Fishery Station in Aneboda (Småland, Southern Sweden), where he established a field laboratory of the Limnological Institute in Lund (now Einar Naumann Field Station).

In 1921 he suggested the establishment of an international association of limnologists to a visiting German colleague, August Thienemann. The following year, on Thursday, August 3, 1922, Naumann and Theinemann co-founded the Societas Internationalis Limnologiae at a meeting held in the auditorium of the Zoological Institute of Kiel University, Germany.

Naumann is also widely known for his contributions to lake typology, and specifically for introducing the terms oligotrophic, eutrophic and dystrophic lake to our modern lake classification.
