= Paleolimnology =

Scientific study of ancient lakes and streams

Paleolimnology (from Greek: παλαιός, palaios, "ancient", λίμνη, limne, "lake", and λόγος, logos, "study") is a scientific sub-discipline closely related to both limnology and paleoecology. Paleolimnological studies focus on reconstructing the past environments of inland waters (e.g., lakes and streams) using the geologic record, especially with regard to events such as climatic change, eutrophication, acidification, and internal ontogenic processes.

Paleolimnological studies are mostly conducted using analyses of the physical, chemical, and mineralogical properties of sediments, or of biological records such as fossil pollen, diatoms, or chironomids.

== History ==
=== Lake ontogeny ===
Most early paleolimnological studies focused on the biological productivity of lakes, and the role of internal lake processes in lake development. Although Einar Naumann had speculated that the productivity of lakes should gradually decrease due to leaching of catchment soils, August Thienemann suggested that the reverse process likely occurred. Early midge records seemed to support Thienemann's view.

Hutchinson and Wollack suggested that, following an initial oligotrophic stage, lakes would achieve and maintain a trophic equilibrium. They also stressed parallels between the early development of lake communities and the sigmoid growth phase of animal communities – implying that the apparent early developmental processes in lakes were dominated by colonization effects, and lags due to the limited reproductive potential of the colonizing organisms.

In a classic paper, Raymond Lindeman outlined a hypothetical developmental sequence, with lakes progressively developing through oligotrophic, mesotrophic, and eutrophic stages, before senescing to a dystrophic stage and then filling completely with sediment. A climax forest community would eventually be established on the peaty fill of the former lake basin. These ideas were further elaborated by Ed Deevey, who suggested that lake development was dominated by a process of morphometric eutrophication. As the hypolimnion of lakes gradually filled with sediments, oxygen depletion would promote the release of iron-bound phosphorus to the overlying water. This process of internal fertilization would stimulate biological productivity, further accelerating the in-filling process.

Deevey and Lindemann's ideas were widely accepted. Although these ideas are still widely held by some limnologists, they were refuted in 1957 by Deevey's student Daniel A. Livingstone. Mel Whiteside also criticized Deevey and Lindemann's hypothesis; and paleolimnologists now think that a host of external factors are equally or more important as regulators of lake development and productivity. Indeed, late-glacial climatic oscillations (e.g., the Younger Dryas) appear to have been accompanied by parallel changes in productivity, which shows that lake development is not a unidirectional process, and climatic change can have a profound effect on lake communities.

=== Anthropogenic eutrophication, acidification, and climate change ===
Interest in paleolimnology eventually shifted from esoteric questions of lake ontogeny to applied investigations of human impact. Torgny Wiederholm and Bill Warwick, for example, used chironomid fossils to assess the impact of increased, human-caused nutrient loading (anthropogenic eutrophication) on lake communities. Their studies revealed pronounced changes in the bottom fauna of North American and European lakes as a consequence of severe oxygen depletion.

From 1980 to 1990 the primary focus of paleolimnologists' efforts shifted to understanding the impact human activity had (e.g., acid rain) versus natural processes (e.g., soil leaching) as drivers of pH change in northern lakes. The pH-sensitivity of diatom communities had been recognized as early as the 1930s, when Friedrich Hustedt developed a classification for diatoms, based on their apparent pH preferences. Gunnar Nygaard subsequently developed a series of diatom pH indices. By calibrating these indices to pH, Jouko Meriläinen introduced the first diatom-pH transfer function. Using diatom and chrysophyte fossil records, research groups were able to clearly demonstrate that many northern lakes had rapidly acidified in consequence of increased industrialization. Although lakes also showed a tendency to acidify slightly during their early (late-glacial) history, the pH of most lakes had remained stable for several thousand years prior to their recent human-driven acidification.

In recent years paleolimnologists have recognized that climate is a dominant force in aquatic ecosystem processes, and have begun to use lacustrine records to reconstruct paleoclimates. Detailed records of historical climate change have been developed from a variety of indicators, including, for example, paleotemperature reconstructions derived from chironomid fossils, and paleosalinity records inferred from diatoms.

Recent studies in the Arctic show that changes in biodiversity are largely due to warming, rather than other associated factors, such as human alteration and acidification. In the Himalayas, bodies of water are not only affected by the anthropogenic disturbances but also impacted by the different types of pollutants that are transferred to the area from afar. Therefore, it is vital to understand all the associated factors acting on aquatic biodiversity, while analyzing the impact of climate change over the years, with the help of lake sediments. It is also important to consider that the impact of climate-change varies depending on an ecosystem's sensitivity to change, when assessing climate change from a paleolimnological perspective.

== Paleoclimate proxies ==
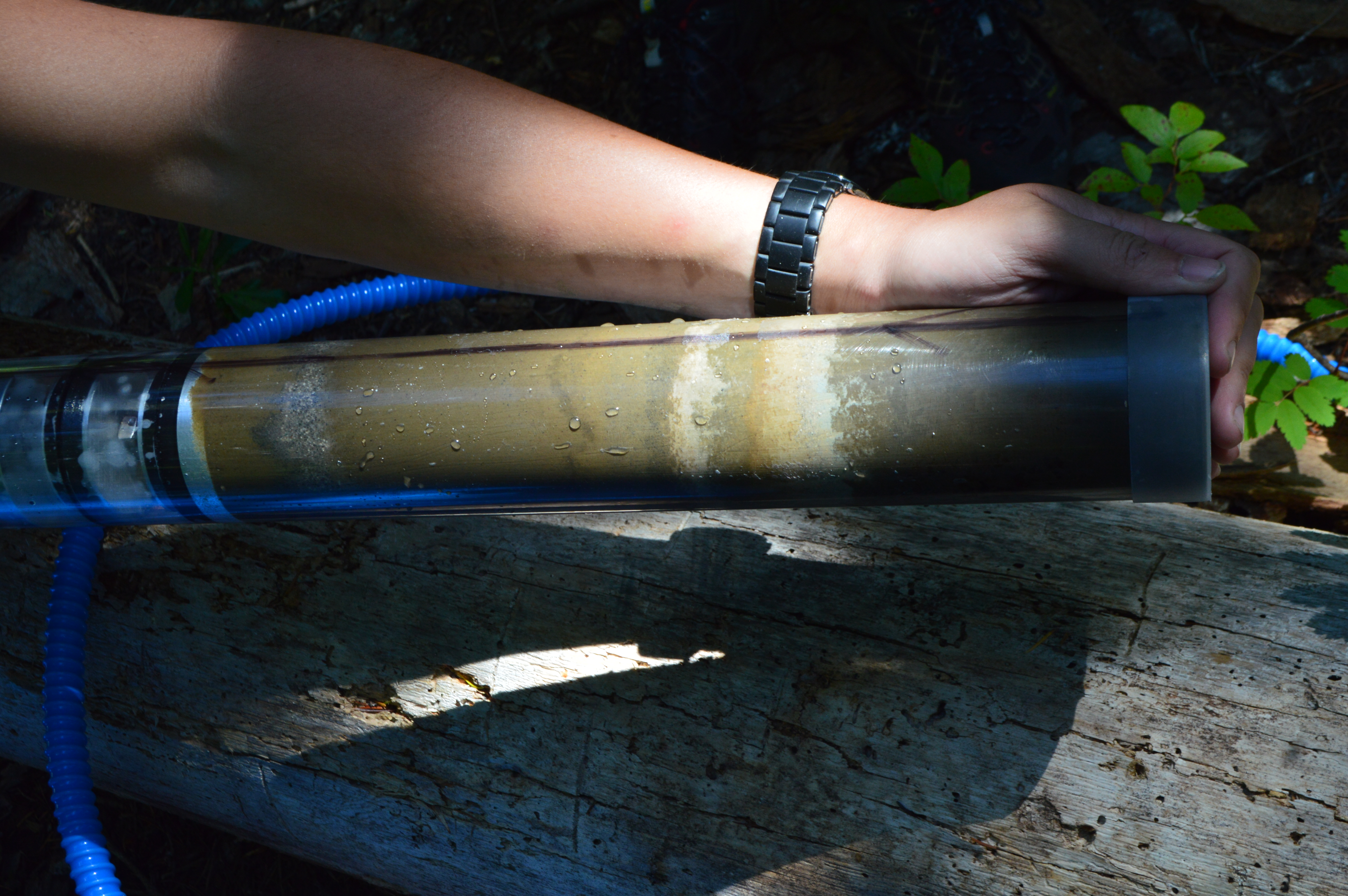
Example of a sediment core taken from the Forlorn lakes in Gifford Pinchot National Forest, Washington

Paleoclimatology (the study of past climates) uses proxy data in order to relate elements collected in modern-day samples to climatic conditions of the past. In paleolimnology, proxy data refer to preserved or fossilized physical markers which serve as substitutes for direct meteorological measurements.

=== Sediment cores ===
Sediment cores are one of the primary tools for studying paleolimnology because of the role lake and river sediments play in preserving biological information. Paleolimnologists collect sediment cores and observe various proxy indicators in order to reconstruct the past limnology of an area. Such proxy data include geochemical markers and isotope data as well as fossilized pollen, charcoal, diatoms, chironomids, and other organic matter. These proxies show distributions and characteristics that can indicate past limnological conditions. In order to calibrate the proxy data extracted from sediment cores, the new core is compared to a group of those from around 40 or more calibration lakes. This allows researchers to assess key differences in the limnological conditions of the lake from which the core is taken. Lake-sediment cores, in particular, facilitate a more comprehensive analysis of an area because of the continual accumulation of sediment as well as other organic matter such as pollen and charcoal. Sediment cores can also be dated quite accurately, often allowing for lake histories to be reconstructed in chronological sequence.

=== Pollen records ===
Historical temperature record of Trout Lake, Yukon, Canada derived from a variety of pollen species proxy data.

Pollen and spores of terrestrial vegetation around a lake are often found within sediment cores and can be analyzed in a lab setting to determine the taxonomy of the pollen grains. The distribution of these pollen grains can offer insight into the historical distribution of vegetation around the lake. Pollen records derived from paleolimnological assessments also allow researchers to track the distribution and density of different vegetation classes across large periods of time, and allow modeling of the successive ecologies of the surrounding landscape. Several studies have been able to assess transitions in vegetation profiles by examining the relationship between different types of land cover. For instance, an increase in the presence of fern pollen and herbaceous plant pollen coinciding with a decrease in grassland pollen often indicates a major disturbance or significant land clearance. Another trend that can be observed from historical pollen records is rates of soil erosion around the lake, as arboreal pollen rates often increase with soil erosion due to increased pollen levels in surface soils.

Vegetation profiles derived from historical pollen analysis are also seen as a key tool in assessing historical climate trends and disturbances. Pollen analysis offers a historical record of vegetation profiles that are sensitive to abrupt changes in climate conditions. Therefore, historical climate events, including human-induced climate change, can shift vegetation profiles relatively rapidly compared to natural transitions. For example, the quantity of poplar pollen increased dramatically at the beginning and end of the Younger Dryas period, serving as a biological marker for that time period. Comparing historical vegetation profiles also allows researchers to compare successive changes in vegetation between two specific regions and correlate these differences with the corresponding climates of each region. A recent study conducted at Shudu Lake in the Hengduan Mountains of Yunnan, , southwestern China, was able to correlate changes in temperature and humidity with the development of needleleaf forests, as well as model recent anthropogenic effects on vegetation distribution in the area.

=== Diatoms ===
The taxonomic assemblages of diatoms reflect many aspects of the temperature, chemical, and nutrient environment of a lake. Diatoms are particularly suited to paleolimnology, due to their silica-based frustules, which are preserved in sufficient condition, and in large enough quantities, to be extracted from sediment cores and identified at the species level. Diatoms have also been examined in conjunction with chrysophycean statospores to estimate nutrient conditions of prehistoric temperate lakes. Such estimations can be derived due to the fact that the predominance of either algal group varies depending on the nutrient conditions of their limnic environment. Diatoms show a high degree of success in water with a high nutrient content as opposed to chyrsophytes, which are better in water with a lower nutrient content. Certain species of diatoms also demonstrate a preference for specific aquatic pH, which allows researchers to estimate the historical pH conditions of a body of water by analyzing the species of diatoms within a sediment core. This makes diatom samples well suited for determining the impact of acid rain on a specific body of water, as diatom inference techniques are advanced enough to estimate relatively small numeric ranges of nutrient levels and pH values, as well as fluctuations in these measurements over a certain paleolimnological period.

=== Organic matter analysis ===
Examinations of the deposition and makeup of organic matter in the sediments of lakes has often been utilized in paleolimnological assessments. A variety of factors are taken into consideration when examining deposited organic matter, including the quantity, origin, and variety of isotopes and biomarkers. Diagenesis can have a significant impact on these factors, and thus careful consideration of such impact is required when drawing conclusions about records of organic matter.

==== Quantity ====
The quantity of organic matter from a sediment core can offer a variety of insights into paleolimnological conditions of a body of water. It often serves as an indicator of primary productivity levels as well as terrestrial nutrient input, as well as serving as a bridge between paleolimnology and geochemistry in demonstrating the relationship between lake geochemistry and organic matter deposition. For instance, a study in eastern China found that larger and deeper highstand lakes in warmer, more humid climates tended to show higher levels of organic matter deposition than lowland lakes in cooler, arid climates. The same study found that the only factor controlling organic matter deposition in the lowland lakes was primary productivity, whereas organic matter deposition in the highland lakes was controlled by a wider array of factors within the lake ecosystem, including terrestrial nutrient input and freshwater inflow.

==== Origin ====
By determining the origins of fossilized organic matter, researchers can make assessments about the vegetation profile in and around the lake, as well as gain a better understanding of microbial density within lake sediments. A key technique in determining the origin of deposited organic matter is to examine the carbon-to-nitrogen ratio (C:N). Aquatic plants are largely non-vascular, which results in their organic matter having a relatively low C:N ratio relative to that of vascular terrestrial plants. This disparity is usually quite large; and although it is lessened by alterations to the C:N ratio during diagenesis, the original disparity is still evident enough to allow researchers to accurately assess from C:N ratios the origin of the organic matter in the lake. This helps researchers determine algal density and terrestrial organic matter inputs during specific historical periods. Several biomarkers also aid in the determination of organic matter origin. Lipid extraction, in particular, is a common practice, as it can reveal acids and alcohols characteristic of algal plants, as well as diagnostic lipids generated in the waxy cuticle of terrestrial plants. Lignin phenols also serve as key biomarkers, helping researchers distinguish the source, plant type, tissue type, and age of organic matter. Lignin is particularly useful in distinguishing between angiosperms and gymnosperms, as well as between woody and non-woody tissue types, which help researchers further develop their knowledge of the surrounding vegetation. It is also important to note that both biomarkers and the C:N ratio can be altered by microbial interactions, some of which can serve as metrics for measuring microbial density, further adding to the breadth of paleolimnological information that can be derived from examinations of organic matter.

==== Carbon isotope analysis ====
Three main carbon fixation pathways exist for plants that end up as deposited organic matter: the C3, C4, and CAM pathways, which all contain slightly different carbon isotope shifts. These shifts further diversify when examining the differences in these pathways between terrestrial and aquatic plants. However, the impact of microbial degradation and food-web interactions diminishes the usefulness of carbon isotopes when differentiating the origins of organic matter. Nonetheless, the total quantity of carbon isotopes can reveal characteristics of lake biochemistry, as periods of time characterized by excessive nutrient cycling generally demonstrate lower carbon isotope loads in deposited organic matter. Additionally, greater carbon-isotope shifts are sometimes observed in organic matter deposited during periods with drier conditions.

==== Nitrogen isotope analysis ====
Nitrogen, like carbon, shows characteristic isotope shifts, depending on the fixation pathway, that can be used to assess certain paleolimnological indices. However, also like carbon, a variety of factors go into the nitrogen isotope composition of lake sediments, which makes assessments derived from this method somewhat speculative. In particular, δ^{15}N values can vary based on productivity levels in aquatic ecosystems. A study that reconstructed lake conditions of Lago Taypi in Cordillera Real, Bolivia, found that when Nitrogen served as the limiting nutrient, levels of nitrogen-fixating algae significantly rose. These algal groups produce δ^{15}N values that closely aligned with those of atmospheric N_{2}, which allowed the researchers to draw conclusions about nutrient cycling and productivity in the lake by examining specific nitrogen isotopes of their sediment cores. Furthermore, in examinations of historic eutrophication trends, δ^{15}N values can be used to differentiate human-driven nitrogen loads from natural inputs, allowing researchers to track the impact of agriculture on the basis of historic nitrogen trends. Human and animal waste, as well as synthetic fertilizers, have diagnostic isotopic shifts that allow researchers to characterize specific nitrogen inputs and track potential human-induced changes in nutrient flux, using δ^{15}N measurements.

=== Chironomids ===
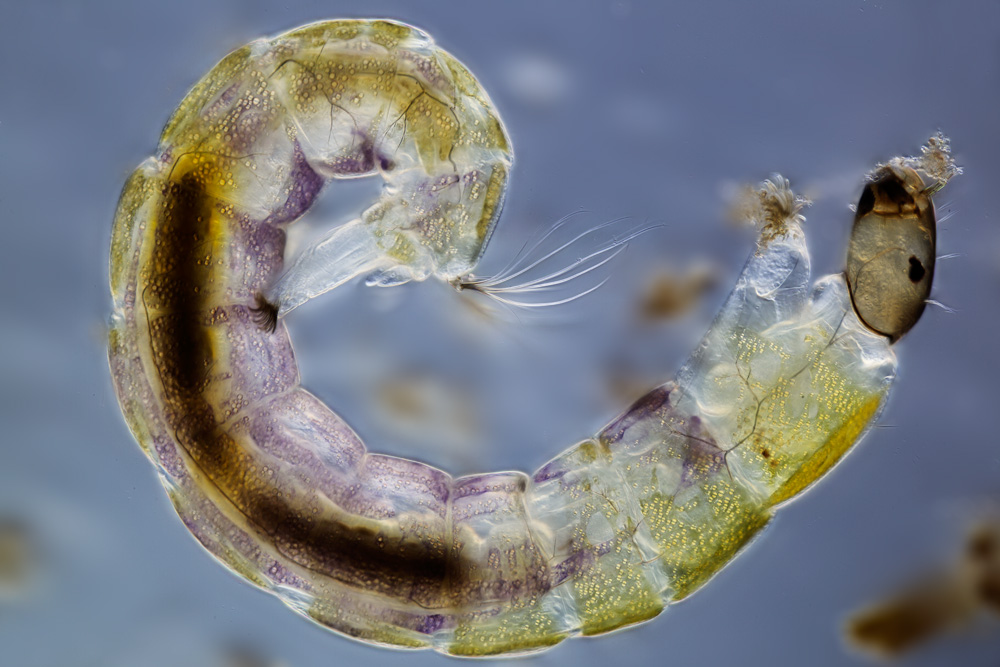
A Chironomidae larvae

==== Chironomids as a paleoclimate proxy ====
Lake deposits have a rich diversity of fossilized insects that trace back to middle Paleozoic era, further increasing in abundance during the Quaternary period. Among the diverse array of aquatic invertebrates, different families of aquatic fly larvae can be extracted from sediments of the Quaternary era. Among them, Chironomids, two-winged flies that belong to the family Chironomidae, are of greatest ecological importance due to their diverse feeding habitats and their role as an important component of the food web. Chironomids complete their larval stage in the water, with their adult life stage outside of the water lasting only a very short time. During their larval stages, Chironomids play an important part in the degradation of material in the aquatic ecosystem. Ecologically they are considered bottom dwellers and are very responsive to any fluctuation in the surrounding environment. Their head capsule and feeding structures are commonly fossilized in lake sediments, allowing them to serve as a valuable paleoclimate proxy.

==== Factors influencing chironomid distribution and abundance ====
One of the major factors that affect chironomid distribution is the climate conditions at local, regional, and global scales. Changes in these conditions are preserved as a fossil record over large periods of time. Through paleolimnological methods, including chironomid assessment, these changes can be extrapolated to predict future climate change. Being very responsive to any fluctuation in the surrounding environment, Chironomids are good indicators of a variety of factors, including salinity, water depth, stream flow, aquatic productivity, oxygen level, lake acidification, pollution, temperature, and overall ecosystem health. Chironomid distribution can be related to those factors using a transfer function to connect a particular group of organisms to a specific environmental variable.

A variety of disparate factors have influenced the abundance and distribution patterns of chironomids in recent history. Therefore, it is important to be careful when making broader interpretations from their fossil records. The impact of temperature on chironomid abundance and diversity, along with other associated factors, has recently been debated. Accurate interpretations of chironomid fossil records must consider a wide array of associated factors within the ecosystem. In order to understand the different forces that have been affecting the fossil data of a lake, it is important to reconstruct the physical, chemical, and nutrient content that actually shape the lake communities. Their distribution and abundance are highly influenced by the combination of human disturbance and changes in climate, both of which influence the catchment area that resulted in changing vegetation, hydrology, and nutrient cycles. Any change at the regional level, especially temperature, affects local water quality and then ultimately has a species-specific effect on habitat.

==== Chironomids and reconstruction of quantitative change in Holocene climate ====
Researchers assessing chironomid distribution primarily examine the temperature, while considering supporting factors, such as pH, salinity, nutrient flow, and productivity, especially of the late Pleistocene/Holocene time period. For many years, research has been carried out into the relationship between temperature and chironomid distribution due to the impact of temperature on chironomid emergence. Chironomids are directly and indirectly affected by temperature during their entire life cycle, including larval emergence, growth, feeding and reproduction. According to Eggermont and Heiri, the indirect impact of temperature on different physical and chemical aspects determines chironomid distribution and abundance. There is also a strong relationship between chironomid abundance, emergence, and distribution and mean water and air temperatures. According to research conducted in the high-altitude lake Lej da la Tscheppa, Switzerland, seasonal temperature reconstruction can be done with the help of independent chironomids and diatoms. Any change in the assemblage of chironomids reflects change in the temperature and duration of ice cover of that body of water due to climate change. According to their findings, chironomids respond mostly to change in summer temperature, so seasonal variation in temperature can be inferred from sediment cores.

==== Use of chironomids in assessments of anthropogenic climate change ====
According to the fifth IPCC report (2014), a key factor in the shaping of aquatic biodiversity is the progression of human-induced climate change. Macroinvertebrates, especially chironomids, have been considered an important indicator of past climate change, in particular with regard to temperature. There is a strong correlation between the chironomid assemblage and water temperature, lake depth, salinity, and nutrient concentrations. Therefore, the impact of climate change on lake water levels can be related to changes in the pattern of chironomid distribution and abundance. This strong correlation indicates the evaporation and precipitation profiles of the lake in the past. Past climatic conditions are reconstructed based on paleolimnology with the help of different fossilized records, especially lake sediments that help differentiate regional and local climate change.
