= Charlotte Kipling =

British statistician and ichthyologist (1919–1992)

- Born: Charlotte Harrison; 7 June 1918
- Died: 9 August 1992 (aged 73)
- Education: Newnham College, Cambridge
- Scientific career
- Fields: Ichthyology Statistics
- Workplaces: Freshwater Biological Association, Institute of Biology, Royal Statistical Society

Charlotte Kipling (1919-1992) was a British statistician and ichthyologist. Starting in 1941 she was employed by the British Navy as a cipher officer in Liverpool. She was associated with the Navy until 1946. In 1947 she was hired by the Freshwater Biological Association in Windermere, Cumbria. She collected data on the changes in the char, pike, and perch populations in the Windermere lake. She was a member of the Royal Statistical Society and the Institute of Biology. She died in 1992 in Millerground Windermere, Cumbria, England.

== Early life and education ==
She was born on 7 June 1919 in Toxteth Park, Liverpool, Lancashire, England. Kipling attended Liverpool College, Juyton and St. Leonard School, St. Andrews before studying economics at Newnham College Cambridge from 1937-1940. She studied at Newnham during a period where women were allowed to attend classes, but were not made full members of the university or granted degrees. This was changed in 1948. There is evidence found in International Women in Science: A Biographical Dictionary to 1950, that would imply Kipling received an M.A. from Newnham in that same year. From 1946-1947 she studied statistics at University College, London before moving to Windermere.

== Scientific career ==
Kipling was hired as a statistician by the Freshwater Biological Association at Ferry House in 1947. While in this position she extensively tracked the diminishing fish populations within the Windermere lake. She developed methodology to help track this data alongside Winifred E. Frost. These methodologies were used to help determine the most efficient ways to gather as much data as possible on the different species within the lake. Most of this research was used within the "Windermere Perch and Pike Project" (Le Cren 2001), which long-term data collected on the Windermere lake by Kipling and her colleagues was used to analyse the ways the different fish populations reacted to their changing environment, as well as the effects of overfishing. The long term data conducted by Kipling was essential to this project and is cited extensively throughout. Most of her publications are similar long-term studies of freshwater fish populations within the Windermere lake (see below).

== Selected publications ==
- Craig, J. F. & Kipling, C. (1983). Reproduction effort versus the environment; case histories of Windermere perch, Perca fluviatilis L., and pike, Esox lucius L. Journal of Fish Biology 22, 713-717.
- Craig, J. F., Kipling, C, Le Cren, E. D. & McCormack, J. C. (1979). Estimates of the numbers, biomass and year-class strengths of perch (Perca fluviatilis L.) in Windermere from 1967 to 1977 and some comparisons with earlier years. Journal of Animal Ecology 48, 315-325.
- Frost, W. E. & Kiplmg, C. (1959). The determination of the age and growth of the pike (Esox lucius L.) from scales and opercular bones. Journal du Conseil permanent international pour VExploration de la Mer 24, 314-341.
- Frost, W. E. & Kipling, C. (1959). A study of the reproduction, early life, weight-length relationship and growth of the pike, Esox lucius L., in Windermere. Journal of Animal Ecology 36, 651-693.
- Frost, W. E. & Kipling, C. (1980). The growth of charr, Salvelinus willoughbii Gunther, in Windermere. Journal of Fish Biology 16, 279-289.
- Kipling, C. (1957). The effect of gill-net selection on the estimation of weight-length relationships. Journal du Conseil permanent international pour VExploration de la Mer 23, 51-63.
- Kipling, C. (1972). The commercial fisheries of Windermere. Transactions of the Cumberland and Westmorland Antiquarian and Archeological Society, N.S. 72, 156-204. doi:10.5284/1062093
- Kipling, C. (1983a). Changes in the growth of pike (Esox lucius) in Windermere. Journal of Animal Ecology 52, 647-657.
- Kipling, C. (1983b). Changes in the population of pike (Esox lucius) in Windermere from 1994 to 1981. Journal of Animal Ecology 52, 989-999.
- Kipling, C. (1984a). A study of perch (Perca fluviatilis L.) and pike (Esox lucius L.) in Windermere from 1941 to 1981. Journal du Conseil permanent international pour l'Exploration de la Mer 41, 259-267.
- Kipling, C. (1984b). Some observations on autumn spawning charr, Salvelinus alpinus L., in Windermere, 1939-1982. Journal of Fish Biology 24, 229-234.
- Kipling, C. & Frost, W. E. (1969). Variations in the fecundity of pike, Esox lucius, in Windermere. Journal of Fish Biology 1, 221-237.
- Kipling, C. & Frost, W. E. (1970). A study of the mortality, population numbers, year-class strengths, production and food consumption of the pike, Esox lucius L., in Windermere from 1944 to 1962. Journal of Animal Ecology 39, 115-157.
- Kipling, C. & Le Cren, E. D. (1984). Mark-recapture experiments on fish in Windermere, 1943-1982. Journal of Fish Biology 24, 395-414.
- Kipling, C. & Roscoe, M. E. (1977). Surface water temperature of Windermere. Monthly and yearly totals of degree-days centigrade and monthly mean temperatures, 1933 to 1975. (Also Addendum, 1976-1980). Freshwater Biological Association Occasional Publication No. 2, Ambleside. 60 + 7 pp.
- Le Cren, E. D. & Kipling, C. (1963). Some marking experiments on spawning populations of char. Special Publications of the International Commission for Northwest Atlantic Fisheries 4, 130-139.
- Le Cren, E. D., Kipling, C. & McCormack, J. C. (1977). A study of the numbers, biomass and year-class strengths of perch (Perca fluviatilis L.) in Windermere from 1941 to 1966. Journal of Animal Ecology 46, 281-307.
