= Limnoforming =

Introducing living organisms in a degraded lake to improve its biological activity

Limnoforming (from Greek: limnee, "lake"; Latin: formo, "to shape", as in shaping, fashioning, molding, modeling) is the process of manipulating the physical or chemical properties of a body of water by introducing organisms which facilitate higher level biological activity, thus impacting the overall ecology of a given body of water, and eventually adjacent ecosystems.

== Process ==
Limnoforming is a process using living organisms to enhance a habitat's abiotic component, ultimately rendering it more conducive to a higher ecological quality. This could be accomplished by introducing a population of organisms, e.g., invertebrates or microbes, en masse to the substrate of a body of water. These organisms would then physically and/or chemically alter the underwater environment to furnish a more suitable substrate for a wider range of biological activity; the result being an increased ecological function (e.g., in trophic dynamics), and thus a higher quality ecological state. Ultimately, limnoforming aims to accelerate the rate of ecological succession in distressed aquatic systems (e.g., lower Green Bay, Lake Michigan), so as to produce a biologically complex climax community in a comparatively short amount of time.

== History ==
The concept of limnoforming originated from the benthic ecology laboratory of Dr. Jerry L. Kaster, School of Freshwater Sciences, University of Wisconsin – Milwaukee. Limnoforming was partially inspired by, and is similar in several aspects to, the concept of terraforming. The two concepts' main similarity is that both aim to accelerate the rate of change occurring in a given environment, in terms of its habitability for a given species or for a number of species, and furthermore, the overall function of its ecology. Instead of creating a habitable ecosystem or biosphere from scratch, limnoforming simply aims to amend degraded earthly aqueous environments less apt to harboring a high quality ecological community into an environment which does support an ecologically flourishing system.

Limnoforming differs from traditional habitat rehabilitation or restoration in that limnoforming is driven by an early sere biological succession process that modifies the physical substrate making it better suited for later seres, whereas rehabilitation/restoration is generally driven by targeting a terminal sere that is poorly adapted at re-forming habitat upon which it depends.

The initial limnoforming study, in Green Bay, Lake Michigan, uses freshwater oligochaetes to re-consolidate highly fluid gyttja substrate (organic black ooze) found extensively in lower Green Bay. The goal is to modify substrate suitability for the mayfly Hexagenia. Historically, this mayfly was found in abundance but the eutrophication of the bay led to their demise in first half of the 20th century.
