= Winifred Frost =

British biologist

Winifred Evelyn Frost (2 March 1902-August 1979) was a British freshwater biologist. Her research focused primarily on eels, minnows, pike, and char by observing fish in the wild. After some time as chair, Frost was then appointed president of the Windermere and District Angling Association.

== Early life and education ==
From 1913 to 1916, Frost attended County Secondary School in Crewe, followed by Cowley Girls' School in St. Helens from 1917 to 1920. She earned her Bachelor of Science from Liverpool University from 1920 to 1923, as well as her Diploma of Education in 1924.

== Career ==
Frost worked with Professor James Johnstone researching euphausids at Liverpool University, where she also earned her Master of Science in zoology in 1926. Starting in 1938, Frost worked as an assistant inspector studying trout in the River Liffey for the Fisheries Branch in Dublin. That same year, she became a research scientist for the Freshwater Biological Association. In 1945, the quality of her published work encouraged Liverpool University to grant Frost her Doctor of Science. Frost co-wrote The Trout, published in 1967 as part of the New Naturalist series, with Margaret E. Brown. The majority of the book was written in the late 1950s, but it took Frost and Brown, in all, 21 years to compile. Frost was also a member of the Council of Salmon and Trout Association, which facilitated her travel to central Africa where she studied eels. Frost remained a staff member at the Freshwater Biological Association until she died in 1979. She bequeathed most of her assets to the Freshwater Biological Association, which then created a scholarship to fund postgraduate students studying freshwater biology.

== Publications ==
- Frost, Winifred E. (1967). The Trout. Collins.
- Frost, Winifred, E. (November 1954). "The Food of Pike, Esox lucius L., in Windermere". Journal of Animal Ecology. 23 (2): 339–360. doi:10.2307/1985. JSTOR 1985.
- Frost, Winifred E. (November 1943). "The Natural History of the Minnow, Phoxinus phoxinus". Journal of Animal Ecology. 12 (2): 139–162. doi:10.2307/1374. JSTOR 1374.
- Frost, Winifred E.; Charlotte Kipling (October 1967). "A Study of Reproduction, Early Life, Weight-Length Relationship and Growth of Pike, Esox lucius L., in Windermere". Journal of Animal Ecology. 36 (3): 651–693. doi:10.2307/2820. JSTOR 2820.
- Frost, Winifred E. (12 October 1965). "Breeding Habits of Windermere Charr, Salvelinus Willughbii (Gunther), and their Bearing on Speciation of these Fish". Proceedings of the Royal Society of London. Series B, Biological Sciences. 163 (991): 232–284. doi:10.1098/rspb.1965.0070. PMID 4378483.
- Frost, Winifred E. (November 1945). "The Age and Growth of Eels (Anguilla anguilla) from the Windermere Catchment Area". Journal of Animal Ecology. 14 (2): 106–124. doi:10.2307/1387. JSTOR 1387.
- Frost, W. E.; Kipling, C. (1 March 1959). "The Determination of the Age and Growth of Pike (Esox lucius L.) from Scales and Opercular Bones". ICES Journal of Marine Science. 24 (2): 314–341. doi:10.1093/icesjms/24.2.314.
- Frost, Winifred E. (1938–1940). "River Liffey Survey: II. The Food Consumed by the Brown Trout (Salmo trutta Linn.) in Acid and Alkaline Waters". Proceedings of the Royal Irish Academy, Section B. 45: 139–206.
- Frost, Winifred E. (1941–1942). "R. Liffey Survey IV. The Fauna of the Submerged "Mosses" in an Acid and an Alkaline Water". Proceedings of the Royal Irish Academy, Section B. 47: 293–369.
- Frost, W. E. (1 July 1950). "The Eel Fisheries of the River Bann, Northern Ireland, and Observations on the Age of the Silver Eels". ICES Journal of Marine Science. 16 (3): 358–383. doi:10.1093/icesjms/16.3.358.
