= Charles R. Goldman =

American limnologist and ecologist

Charles Remington Goldman
- Born: November 9, 1930 (age 95); Urbana, Illinois
- Education: University of Illinois (BA, MS); University of Michigan (PhD)
- Scientific career
- Workplaces: United States Fish and Wildlife Service; University of California, Davis; University of Nevada, Reno; Desert Research Institute
- Thesis: Primary productivity and limiting factors in three lakes of the alaska penninsula (1959)
- Doctoral advisor: K. F. Lagler; G. E. Lauf
- Doctoral students: Carol Folt
- Website: charlesrgoldman.com

Charles Remington Goldman (born November 9, 1930 in Urbana, Illinois) is an American limnologist and ecologist. He is a Distinguished Professor Emeritus at the Department of Environmental Science of the University of California, Davis.

== Education ==
Goldman received a Bachelor of Arts with a major in geology in 1952 and a Master of Science in zoology in 1955, both from the University of Illinois. He received a Doctor of Philosophy in zoology in 1958 from the University of Michigan.

== Career ==
From 1957 to 1958, Goldman worked as a Fisheries Research Biologist for the United States Fish and Wildlife Service in Alaska. In 1958, he joined the University of California, Davis as an instructor and was promoted to full professor of zoology in 1966. From 1966 to 1969, and again from 1990 to 1991, he served as the founding director of the Institute of Ecology. In 1971, he became a Distinguished Professor of Limnology in the Department of Environmental Science and Policy. After retiring from UC Davis in 2010, he became an adjunct professor at the University of Nevada, Reno and the Desert Research Institute, which had awarded him the 16th Nevada Medal for Science in 2003.

=== Research ===
In the mid-1960s, Goldman established the Tahoe Research Group at UC Davis, which later become the Tahoe Environmental Research Center (TERC).

His five decades of research on Lake Tahoe and Castle Lake, California, have included lake dynamics, eutrophication, the development of artificial wetlands, impact of de-icing agents for highways, and comparative ecological analyses of Lake Baikal, Russia, and hydroelectric impoundments worldwide.

Goldman was instrumental in reestablishing the European Crayfish Industry with resistant Lake Tahoe Crayfhis following a plague of North American origin that decimated the European native crayfish stocks.

Goldman's research has taken him to every continent on the globe, from Oregon's Crater Lake to Antarctica, where a glacier is named in honor of his research. ... He was part of the United Nations' expedition that resulted in declaring Lake Baikal an international heritage lake. In 1991 he was a founder if the Tahoe-Baikal Institute which sponsored exchange between students in the United States and Russia who are interested in environmental management.

Goldman did environmental studies on the impacts of hydroelectric dam projects in Honduras, Costa Rica, Argentina, Ecuador, Nigeria and Papua New Guinea. He discovered trace element limitation of algal growth in North American and New Zealand Lakes resulting in fertilization of sockeye salmon lakes. He developed a gas phase calibration method for 14 Carbon productivity measurements in marine and freshwaters. He demonstrated the importance of lake and riverside vegetation (alder trees) in providing nitrogen fertilization of streams and lakes. He mentored 101 graduate students (including Maria Rosa Miracle Solé) and 37 post doctoral students while teaching from 1958 until 2010 at the University of California, Davis. He received the Dianne Feinstein conservation award from the Tahoe Regional Planning Agency in 2022 for his research and environmental leadership.

=== Social engagement ===
Goldman served as vice president of the Ecological Society of America, as president of the American Society of Limnology and Oceanography, and on many national and international committees, notably as chair of the United States National Committee of UNESCO's Man and the Biosphere Programme.

In 1963, Goldman was elected a Fellow of the American Association for the Advancement of Science. Goldman has published five books and over 400 scientific articles. He has produced four educational films, including three on Lake Tahoe and one on "Research to Protect the Tropics" narrated by the late Lloyd Bridges as Vice President of Research for the Organization of Tropical Studies.

Goldman was a Guggenheim Fellow for the academic year 1964–1965. In 1998, he received the Albert Einstein World Award of Science. UC Davis's Goldman-Schladow Limnology Fellowship is named in his honor through the Tahoe Environmental Research Center. He was one of the inaugural Fellows of the Ecological Society of America, elected in 2012.

== Selected publications ==
- with Alexander J. Horne: Limnology, McGraw Hill 1983
- as editor with James McEvoy III and Peter J. Richerson: Environmental quality and water development, Freeman, San Francisco 1973
- as editor with Michio Kumagai and Richard D. Robarts: Climatic Change and Global Warming of Inland Waters: Impacts and Mitigation for Ecosystems and Societies, Chichester, West Sussex, UK : John Wiley & Sons Inc., 2013.
