= International Society of Limnology =

- Founder: August Thienemann; Einar Naumann

The International Society of Limnology (SIL) is an international scientific society that disseminates information among limnologists, those who study all aspects of inland waters, including their physics, chemistry, biology, geology, and management. It was founded by August Thienemann and Einar Naumann in 1922 as the International Association of Theoretical and Applied Limnology and Societas Internationalis Limnologiae.

It had about 2800 members in 2008. SIL celebrated its 100th anniversary at a meeting in Berlin, Germany, in August 2022.

SIL publishes the following scientific publications:

- the journal Fundamental and Applied Limnology:Archiv für Hydrobiologie ISSN 1863-9135 ; prior to 2007, it was called Archiv für Hydrobiologie.
- Communications (Mitteilungen), irregular publication.
- Limnology in Developing Countries, a book series.
- Congress proceedings, until 2007, published as Verhandlungen Internationale Vereinigung für theoretische und angewandte Limnologie.
- SIL has discontinued publication of the Verhandlungen and has replaced it with a peer-reviewed journal entitled Inland Waters. The new journal was launched at the 31st SIL Congress in Cape Town 2010, with first publication in 2011. The journal is supported by the electronic submission and tracking system of the Freshwater Biological Association. Manuscripts will be published consecutively online (as accepted) and quarterly in paper format. Access to the electronic version is provided to all SIL members and subscribers.

== Congresses ==
- 1922 Germany
- 1923 Austria
- (Soviet Union) 1925 USSR
- 1927 Italy
- 1930 Hungary
- 1932 Netherlands
- (Socialist Federal Republic of Yugoslavia) 1934 Yugoslavia
- 1937 France
- 1939 Sweden
- 1948 Switzerland
- 1950 Belgium
- (United Kingdom) 1953 Britain
- 1956 Finland
- 1959 Austria
- 1962 United States
- 1965 Poland
- 1968 Israel
- (Soviet Union) 1971 USSR
- 1974 Canada
- 1977 Denmark
- 1980 Japan
- 1983 France
- 1987 New Zealand
- 1989 Germany
- 1992 Spain
- 1995 Brazil
- (Republic of Ireland) 1998 Ireland
- 2001 Australia
- 2004 Finland
- 2007 Canada

(Above list from Jones, 2010)

- 2010 South Africa
- 2013 Hungary
- 2016 Italy
- 2018 China
- 2021 South Korea
- 2022 Germany
