= Arthur D. Hasler =

American ecologist (1908–2001)

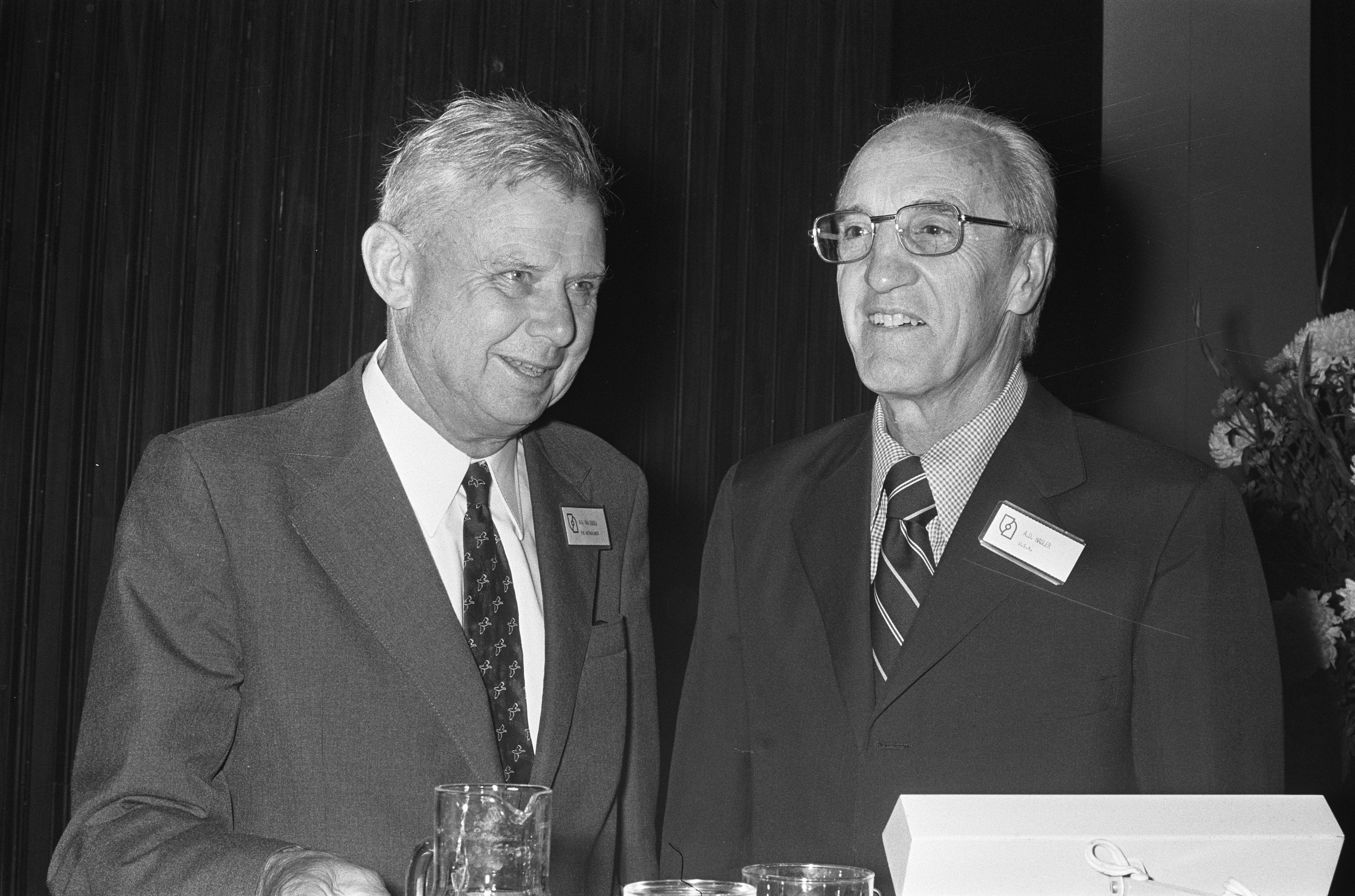
W.H. van Dobben and Arthur D. Hasler (1974)

Arthur Davis Hasler (January 5, 1908 – March 23, 2001) was an ecologist who is credited with explaining the salmon's homing instinct. Hasler was a member of the National Academy of Sciences and the American Academy of Arts and Sciences. The New York Times called him "an internationally recognized authority on freshwater ecology". He served as President of The Ecological Society of America, which called him "one of the leading figures in 20th century freshwater ecology". Hasler pioneered a research method based on manipulation of entire lake ecosystems. This method became an instrumental new tool for ecology. He published over 200 scientific papers, was an author or an editor of 7 books, and supervisor of 52 doctoral degrees.

== Career ==
Hasler was born in Lehi, Utah. He married Hanna Prusse in 1932, and they had six children: Sylvia, A. Frederick, Bruce, Galen, Mark, and Karl. He graduated from Brigham Young University in 1932. He received a doctorate in zoology from the University of Wisconsin–Madison in 1937. Hasler was an analyst with the Air Force Strategic Bombing Survey based in Germany after World War II. Hasler was a Fulbright scholar at the Max Planck Institute in Germany from 1954 to 1955. Subsequently, Hasler was on the faculty of the University of Wisconsin–Madison for 41 years and under his leadership it became a hub for lake research. In 1961 he served as President of The Ecological Society of America. He headed the Limnology Laboratory at the University of Wisconsin–Madison from 1963 to 1968. In 1969 he was elected to the National Academy of Sciences.
