= Shoreline development index =

Ratio indicating irregularity of a lake shoreline

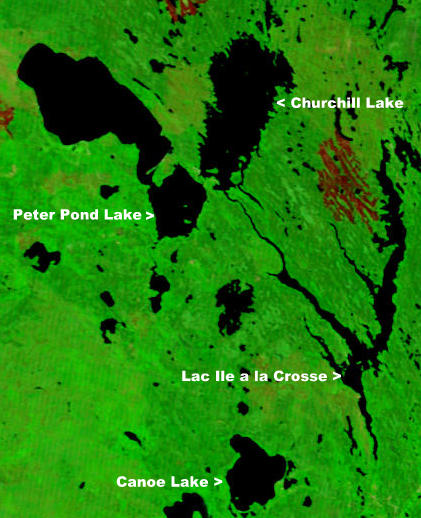
Lakes in Saskatchewan with varying shoreline development indices (islands included): Peter Pond - 1.5, Churchill - 4.1, Ile a la Crosse - 8.2

The shoreline development index of a lake is the ratio of the length of the lake's shoreline to the circumference of a circle with the same area as the lake. It is given in equation form as $D_L = \frac{L}{2 \sqrt{\pi A}}$, where $D_L$ is shoreline development, $L$ is the length of the lake's shoreline, and $A$ is the lake's area. The length and area should be measured in the same units (e.g., m and m^{2}, or km and km^{2}). The shoreline development index is $D_L = 1$ for perfectly circular lakes. $D_L > 1$ for lakes with complex shapes.

== Patterns ==
Shoreline development correlates strongly with lake area, although this partly reflects the scale dependence of the index (see Limitations). To some extent, the shoreline development index reflects the mode of origin for lakes. For example, volcanic crater lakes often have shoreline development index values near 1, whereas fluvial oxbow lakes often have very high shoreline development index values.

== Application to lakes with islands ==
The index can also include the length of island shoreline, modifying the formula to $D_{L+L_i} = \frac{L+L_i}{2 \sqrt{\pi A}}$, where $L_i$ is the combined length of the lake's islands' shoreline.

== Limitations ==
Lake shorelines are fractal. This means that measurements of shore length are longer when measured on high-resolution maps compared to low-resolution maps. Therefore, a lake's shoreline development index will be greater when calculated based on shorelines measured from high-resolution maps compared to low-resolution maps. Consequently, shoreline development index values cannot be compared for lakes with shorelines measured from maps with different scales. Additionally, the shoreline development index cannot be compared for lakes with different surface areas because large lakes automatically have higher values than smaller lakes, even if they have the same planform shape. Hence the shoreline development index can only be used to compare lakes with the same surface area that are also mapped at the same scale. Making comparisons like this can create spurious correlations between the shoreline development index and ecological variables.
