= Center for Limnology =

The Center for Limnology (CFL) is a research center within the College of Letters and Science at the University of Wisconsin—Madison. Established by the UW-Madison Board of Regents in July 1982, the mission of the center is to plan, conduct, and facilitate inland water research.

== Research facilities ==
The CFL consists of two main research stations: the Arthur D. Hasler Laboratory for Limnology on the UW-Madison campus (Hasler Lab), and the Trout Lake Station, in Boulder Junction, Wisconsin.
