= August Thienemann =

German limnologist, zoologist and ecologist

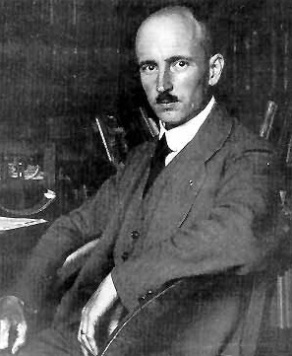
- Thienemann
- Born: August Friedrich Thienemann; 7 September 1882; Gotha
- Died: 22 April 1960; Plön
- Occupations: limnologist, zoologist and ecologist

August Friedrich Thienemann (7 September 1882 in Gotha – 22 April 1960 in Plön) was a German limnologist, zoologist and ecologist. He studied zoology at the University of Greifswald.

He was an associate Professor of Hydrobiology at the University of Kiel, and director of the former Hydrobiologische Anstalt der Kaiser-Wilhelm-Gesellschaft (now the Max-Planck-Institut für Limnologie) at Plön.

A co-founder of Societas Internationalis Limnologiae, Thienemann is best known for his work on the biology of the Chironomidae, and his contributions to the field of lake typology. He also introduced the concept of trophic level terminology in 1920. The Ecological niche: ‘Only those organisms can be present in a biocoenosis that are adapted to the living conditions of the respective biocoenosis; they must be able to live their lives under the special chemical and physical as well as ecological conditions of the respective biotope. Over the course of his career, Thienemann published 460 works. One of his more noted students was Carmel Humphries, an Irish expert in Chironomidae.

== Publications (partial list) ==
- 1909 B. Farwick, F. Schröder, A. Thienemann: "Bericht über die botanischen und zoologischen Exkursionen nach dem Weißenstein bei Hohenlimburg und nach der Glörtalsperre am 25. und 26. September 1909." S.-B. naturhist. Ver. preuß. Rheinl. Westf., E 1909: 94–101.
- 1910 "Die Stufenfolge der Dinge: Der Versuch eines natürlichen Systems der Naturkörper aus dem 18. Jahrhundert." Zoologische Annalen Würzburg 3, 185–274.
- 1911 "Hydrobiologische und fischereiliche Untersuchungen an westfälischen Talsperren." Z. wiss. Landwirtsch., 41: 535–716. Steglitz. 371.
- 1911 "Die Verschmutzung der Ruhr im Sommer 1911", in: Zeitschrift für Fischerei und deren Hilfswissenschaften 16 (1912), S. 55–86.
- 1912 "Der Bergbach des Sauerlandes. Faunistisch-biolozische Untersuchungen." Int. Rev. Ges. Hydrobiol. Biol./ Suppl. 4: 1–125. Leipzig.
- 1915 Die Chironomidenfauna der Eifelmaare; Verhandlungen des Naturhistorischen Vereins der preußischen Rheinlande und Westfalens 71
- 1918 Untersuchungen über de Beziehung zwischen dem Sauerstoffgehalt des Wassers und der Zusammensetzung der Fauna in norddeutschen Seen"; Arch. Hydrobiol. 12, 1 - 65.
- 1923 "Geschichte der 'Chironomus'-Forschung von Aristoteles bis zur Gegenwart." Deutsche Entomologische Zeitung, 515– 540.
- 1925 Die Binnengewässer Mitteleuropas; Stuttgart
- 1927 "Forschungsreisen und das System der Biologie." Zoologische Anzeiger 73, 245–253.
- 1928 Der Sauerstoff im eutrophen und oligotrophen See; Die Binnengewässer 4, Stuttgart
- 1931 Der Produktionsbegriff in der Biologie; Arch. Hydrobiol. 22, 616–622.
- 1939 Grundzüge einer allgemeinen Ökologie; ebda 35
- 1941 Leben und Umwelt; Leipzig
- 1951 "Vom Gebrauch und vom Mißbrauch der Gewässer in einem Kulturlande." Arch. Hydrobiol. 45, 557–583.
- 1954 "Lebenseinheiten." Abhandlungen des naturwissenschaftlichen Vereins Bremen 33, 303–326.
- 1955 Die Binnengewässer: Eine Einführung in die theoretische und angewandte Limnologie; Verständliche Wissenschaft 55, Berlin, Heidelberg und Jena.
- 1956 Leben und Umwelt: Vom Gesamthaushalt der Natur; Hamburg
- 1956 Die Binnengewässer; Stuttgart
- 1959 Erinnerungen und Tagebuchblätter eines Biologen; Ein Leben im Dienste der Limnologie; Stuttgart
