= Limnology =

Science of inland aquatic ecosystems

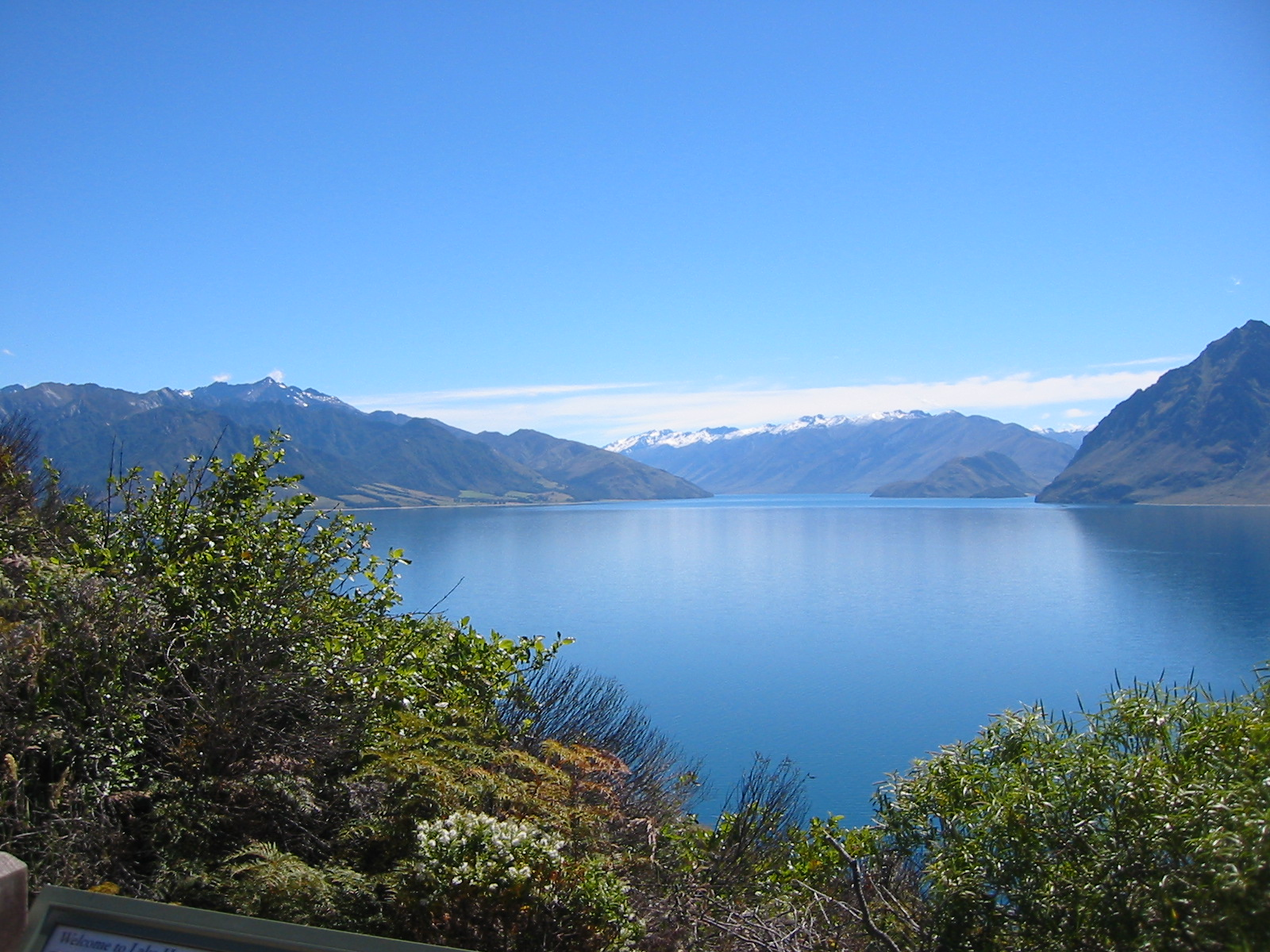
Lake Hāwea, New Zealand

Limnology is the study of inland aquatic ecosystems. Pronounced /lɪmˈnɒlədʒi/ (lim-NOL-ə-jee), the name comes from Ancient Greek λίμνη (límnē) 'lake' and -λογία (-logía) 'study of'. It includes aspects of the biological, chemical, physical, and geological characteristics of natural and man-made bodies of fresh and saline water. This includes the study of lakes, reservoirs, ponds, rivers, springs, streams, wetlands, and groundwater. Water systems are often categorized as either running (lotic) or standing (lentic).

Limnology includes the study of the drainage basin, the movement of water through the basin, and the biogeochemical changes that occur en route. A more recent sub-discipline of limnology, termed landscape limnology, studies, manages, and seeks to conserve these ecosystems using a landscape perspective, by explicitly examining connections between an aquatic ecosystem and its drainage basin. Recently, the need to understand global inland waters as part of the Earth system created a sub-discipline called global limnology. This approach considers processes in inland waters on a global scale, like the role of inland aquatic ecosystems in global biogeochemical cycles.

Limnology is closely related to aquatic ecology and hydrobiology, which study aquatic organisms and their interactions with the abiotic (non-living) environment. While limnology has substantial overlap with freshwater-focused disciplines (e.g., freshwater biology), it also includes the study of inland salt lakes.

== History ==
The term limnology was coined by François-Alphonse Forel (1841–1912) who established the field with his studies of Lake Geneva. Interest in the discipline rapidly expanded, and in 1922 August Thienemann (a German zoologist) and Einar Naumann (a Swedish botanist) co-founded the International Society of Limnology (SIL, from Societas Internationalis Limnologiae). Forel's original definition of limnology, "the oceanography of lakes", was expanded to encompass the study of all inland waters, and influenced Benedykt Dybowski's work on Lake Baikal.

Prominent early American limnologists included G. Evelyn Hutchinson and Ed Deevey. At the University of Wisconsin-Madison, Edward A. Birge, Chancey Juday, Charles R. Goldman, and Arthur D. Hasler contributed to the development of the Center for Limnology.

== General limnology ==
=== Physical properties ===
Physical properties of aquatic ecosystems are determined by a combination of heat, currents, waves and other seasonal distributions of environmental conditions. The morphometry of a body of water depends on the type of feature (such as a lake, river, stream, wetland, estuary etc.) and the structure of the earth surrounding the body of water. Lakes, for instance, are classified by their formation, and zones of lakes are defined by water depth. River and stream system morphometry is driven by the underlying geology of the area as well as the general velocity of the water. Stream morphometry is also influenced by topography (especially slope) as well as precipitation patterns and other factors such as vegetation and land development. Connectivity between streams and lakes relates to the landscape drainage density, lake surface area and lake shape.

Other types of aquatic systems which fall within the study of limnology are estuaries. Estuaries are bodies of water classified by the interaction of a river and the ocean or sea. Wetlands vary in size, shape, and pattern however the most common types, marshes, bogs and swamps, often fluctuate between containing shallow, freshwater and being dry depending on the time of year. The volume and quality of water in underground aquifers rely on the vegetation cover, which fosters recharge and aids in maintaining water quality.

==== Light interactions ====
Light zonation is the concept of how the amount of sunlight penetration into water influences the structure of a body of water. These zones define various levels of productivity within an aquatic ecosystems such as a lake. For instance, the depth of the water column which sunlight is able to penetrate and where most plant life is able to grow is known as the photic or euphotic zone. The rest of the water column which is deeper and does not receive sufficient amounts of sunlight for plant growth is known as the aphotic zone. The amount of solar energy present underwater and the spectral quality of the light that are present at various depths have a significant impact on the behavior of many aquatic organisms. For example, zooplankton's vertical migration is influenced by solar energy levels.

==== Thermal stratification ====
Similar to light zonation, thermal stratification or thermal zonation is a way of grouping parts of the water body within an aquatic system based on the temperature of different lake layers. The less turbid the water, the more light is able to penetrate, and thus heat is conveyed deeper in the water. Heating declines exponentially with depth in the water column, so the water will be warmest near the surface but progressively cooler as moving downwards. There are three main sections that define thermal stratification in a lake. The epilimnion is closest to the water surface and absorbs long- and shortwave radiation to warm the water surface. During cooler months, wind shear can contribute to the cooling of the water surface. The thermocline is an area within the water column where water temperatures rapidly decrease. The bottom layer is the hypolimnion, which tends to have the coldest water because its depth restricts sunlight from reaching it. In temperate lakes, fall-season cooling of surface water results in turnover of the water column, where the thermocline is disrupted, and the lake temperature profile becomes more uniform. In cold climates, when water cools below 4 °C (the temperature of maximum density) many lakes can experience an inverse thermal stratification in winter. These lakes are often dimictic, with a brief spring overturn in addition to a longer fall overturn. The relative thermal resistance is the energy needed to mix these strata of different temperatures.

==== Lake heat budget ====
An annual heat budget, also shown as θ_{a}, is the total amount of heat needed to raise the water from its minimum winter temperature to its maximum summer temperature. This can be calculated by integrating the area of the lake at each depth interval (A_{z}) multiplied by the difference between the summer (θ_{sz}) and winter (θ_{wz}) temperatures or $\displaystyle \int$A_{z}(θ_{sz}-θ_{wz})

=== Chemical properties ===
The chemical composition of water in aquatic ecosystems is influenced by natural characteristics and processes including precipitation, underlying soil and bedrock in the drainage basin, erosion, evaporation, and sedimentation. All bodies of water have a certain composition of both organic and inorganic elements and compounds. Biological reactions also affect the chemical properties of water. In addition to natural processes, human activities strongly influence the chemical composition of aquatic systems and their water quality.

Allochthonous sources of carbon or nutrients come from outside the aquatic system (such as plant and soil material). Carbon sources from within the system, such as algae and the microbial breakdown of aquatic particulate organic carbon, are autochthonous. In aquatic food webs, the portion of biomass derived from allochthonous material is then named "allochthony". In streams and small lakes, allochthonous sources of carbon are dominant while in large lakes and the ocean, autochthonous sources dominate.

==== Oxygen and carbon dioxide ====
Dissolved oxygen and dissolved carbon dioxide are often discussed together due their coupled role in respiration and photosynthesis. Dissolved oxygen concentrations can be altered by physical, chemical, and biological processes and reaction. Physical processes including wind mixing can increase dissolved oxygen concentrations, particularly in surface waters of aquatic ecosystems. Because dissolved oxygen solubility is linked to water temperatures, changes in temperature affect dissolved oxygen concentrations as warmer water has a lower capacity to "hold" oxygen as colder water. Biologically, both photosynthesis and aerobic respiration affect dissolved oxygen concentrations. Photosynthesis by autotrophic organisms, such as phytoplankton and aquatic algae, increases dissolved oxygen concentrations while simultaneously reducing carbon dioxide concentrations, since carbon dioxide is taken up during photosynthesis. All aerobic organisms in the aquatic environment take up dissolved oxygen during aerobic respiration, while carbon dioxide is released as a byproduct of this reaction. Because photosynthesis is light-limited, both photosynthesis and respiration occur during the daylight hours, while only respiration occurs during dark hours or in dark portions of an ecosystem. The balance between dissolved oxygen production and consumption is calculated as the aquatic metabolism rate.

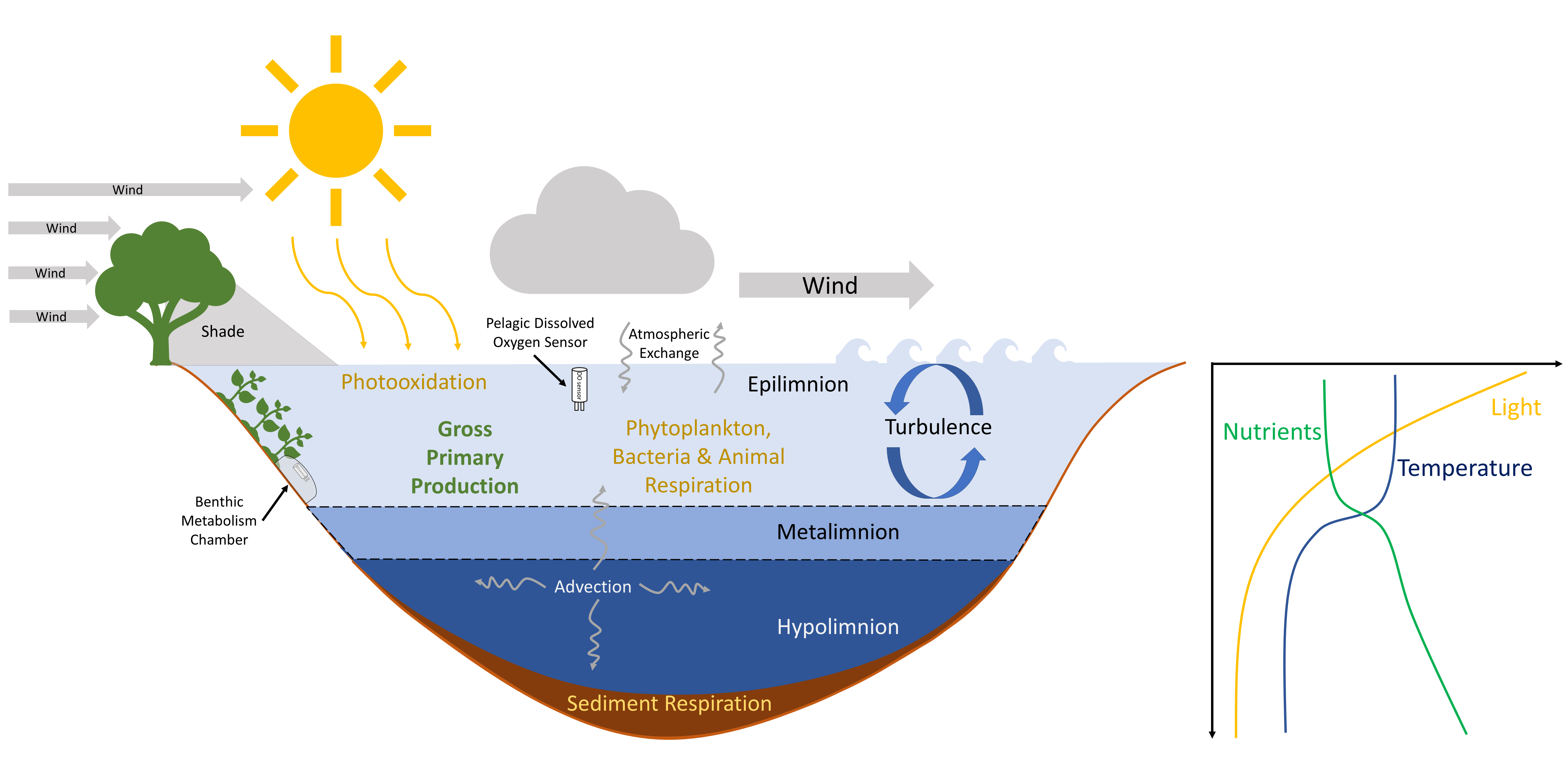
Lake cross-sectional diagram of the factors influencing lake metabolic rates and concentration of dissolved gases within lakes. Processes in gold text consume oxygen and produce carbon dioxide while processes in green text produce oxygen and consume carbon dioxide.

Vertical changes in the concentrations of dissolved oxygen are affected by both wind mixing of surface waters and the balance between photosynthesis and respiration of organic matter. These vertical changes, known as profiles, are based on similar principles as thermal stratification and light penetration. As light availability decreases deeper in the water column, photosynthesis rates also decrease, and less dissolved oxygen is produced. This means that dissolved oxygen concentrations generally decrease as you move deeper into the body of water because of photosynthesis is not replenishing dissolved oxygen that is being taken up through respiration. During periods of thermal stratification, water density gradients prevent oxygen-rich surface waters from mixing with deeper waters. Prolonged periods of stratification can result in the depletion of bottom-water dissolved oxygen; when dissolved oxygen concentrations are below 2 milligrams per liter, waters are considered hypoxic. When dissolved oxygen concentrations are approximately 0 milligrams per liter, conditions are anoxic. Both hypoxic and anoxic waters reduce available habitat for organisms that respire oxygen, and contribute to changes in other chemical reactions in the water.

==== Nitrogen ====
Nitrogen is a nutrient central for the function of aquatic ecosystems. Nitrogen is generally present as a dissolved gas (N_{2}) in aquatic ecosystems, however due to the high energy requirement of utilising N_{2} most organisms tend not to use it. Therefore, most water quality studies tend to focus on nitrate, nitrite and ammonia levels. Most of these dissolved nitrogen compounds follow a seasonal pattern with greater concentrations in the fall and winter months compared to the spring and summer.

==== Phosphorus ====
Another important nutrient in aquatic systems is phosphorus. Phosphorus has a different role in aquatic ecosystems as it is a limiting factor in the growth of phytoplankton because of generally low concentrations in the water. Dissolved phosphorus is also crucial to all living things, is often very limiting to primary productivity in freshwater, and has its own distinctive ecosystem cycling.

=== Biological properties ===
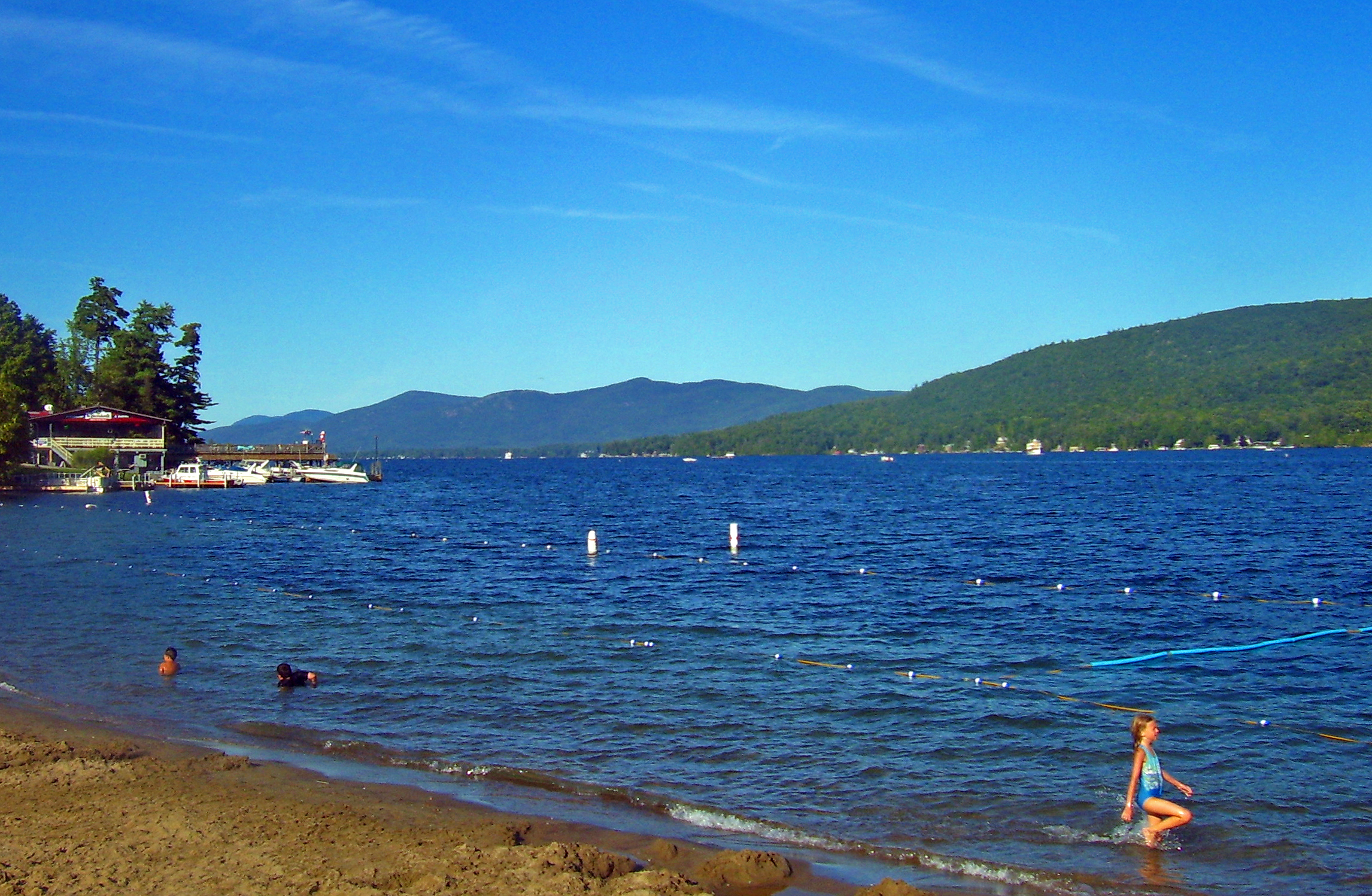
Lake George, New York, United States, an oligotrophic lake

==== Role in ecology ====
Lakes "are relatively easy to sample, because they have clear-cut boundaries (compared to terrestrial ecosystems) and because field experiments are relatively easy to perform.", which make then especially useful for ecologists who try to understand ecological dynamics.

==== Lake trophic classification ====
One way to classify lakes (or other bodies of water) is with the trophic state index. An oligotrophic lake is characterized by relatively low levels of primary production and low levels of nutrients. A eutrophic lake has high levels of primary productivity due to very high nutrient levels. Eutrophication of a lake can lead to algal blooms. Dystrophic lakes have high levels of humic matter and typically have yellow-brown, tea-coloured waters. These categories do not have rigid specifications; the classification system can be seen as more of a spectrum encompassing the various levels of aquatic productivity.

== Tropical limnology ==
Tropical limnology is a unique and important subfield of limnology that focuses on the distinct physical, chemical, biological, and cultural aspects of freshwater systems in tropical regions. The physical and chemical properties of tropical aquatic environments are different from those in temperate regions, with warmer and more stable temperatures, higher nutrient levels, and more complex ecological interactions. Moreover, the biodiversity of tropical freshwater systems is typically higher, human impacts are often more severe, and there are important cultural and socioeconomic factors that influence the use and management of these systems.

== Professional organizations ==
People who study limnology are called limnologists. These scientists largely study the characteristics of inland fresh-water systems such as lakes, rivers, streams, ponds and wetlands. They may also study non-oceanic bodies of salt water, such as the Great Salt Lake. There are many professional organizations related to limnology and other aspects of the aquatic science, including: the Association for the Sciences of Limnology and Oceanography, the Asociación Ibérica de Limnología, the International Society of Limnology, the Polish Limnological Society, the Society of Canadian Aquatic Sciences (formed by a merger in 2022 of the Canadian Conference for Fisheries Research and the Society of Canadian Limnologists), the Society for Freshwater Science, and the Freshwater Biological Association.

== See also ==
- Hydrology – Science of the movement, distribution, and quality of water on Earth
- Lake ecosystem, also known as Lentic ecosystems – Type of ecosystem
- Limnoforming – Introducing living organisms in a degraded lake to improve its biological activity
- Limnological tower – Structure for the study of aquatic ecosystems
- River ecosystem, also known as Lotic ecosystems – Type of aquatic ecosystem with flowing freshwater
- Paleolimnology – Scientific study of ancient lakes and streams
