= Edward Smith Deevey Jr. =

Edward Smith Deevey Jr. (3 December 1914 – 29 November 1988), born in Albany, New York, was a prominent American ecologist and paleolimnologist, and an early protégé of G. Evelyn Hutchinson at Yale University. He was a creative pioneer in several areas, including quantitative palynology, cycling of natural isotopes, biogeochemistry, population dynamics, systematics and ecology of freshwater zooplankton, and he promoted the use of life tables in ecology.

In 1938, Deevey received his Ph.D. in Zoology from Yale University as a student of Hutchinson. He taught at Yale from 1946 to 1968. In 1971, he became curator of paleoecology at the Florida Museum of Natural History and a research professor at the University of Florida, where he remained until the time of his death.

Deevey served as president of the Ecological Society of America in 1969–70, and in 1982, received the Eminent Ecologist Award from that organization. He was elected to the National Academy of Sciences in 1981.
