= ECI Prize =

The ECI Prize is a prize awarded annually from 1986 onwards to an ecologist distinguished by outstanding and sustained scientific achievements. It is awarded jointly by the International Ecology Institute, a non-profit organization of research ecologists based in Germany dedicated to fostering ecological knowledge and awareness, and the Otto Kinne Foundation.

The prize both honors the recipient and requires him or her to serve science and society by authoring a book to be published in the series 'Excellence in Ecology', published by Inter-Research and available at cost price. The ECI Prize carries an endowment of € 6,000 and is awarded alternatively for terrestrial ecology, marine ecology and limnetic ecology.

== ECI Prize Laureates ==
Source: Ecology Institute

- 1986 Tom Fenchel (Denmark) , marine ecology
- 1987 Edward O. Wilson (United States) , terrestrial ecology
- 1988 Gene Likens (United States) , limnetic ecology
- 1989 Robert T. Paine (United States) , marine ecology
- 1990 Harold A. Mooney (United States) , terrestrial ecology
- 1991 Robert H. Peters (Canada) , limnetic ecology
- 1992 David H. Cushing (United Kingdom) , marine ecology
- 1993 Paul R. Ehrlich (United States) , terrestrial ecology
- 1994 Colin S. Reynolds (United Kingdom) , limnetic ecology
- 1995 Ramon Margalef (Spain) , marine ecology
- 1996 John Lawton (United Kingdom) , terrestrial ecology
- 1997 Maciej Gliwicz (Poland) , limnetic ecology
- 1998 Richard T. Barber (United States) , marine ecology
- 1999 Ilkka Hanski (Finland) , terrestrial ecology
- 2000 Stephen R. Carpenter (United States) , limnetic ecology
- 2001 Louis Legendre (France) , marine ecology
- 2002 Michel Loreau (France) , terrestrial ecology
- 2003 Jonathan J. Cole (United States) , limnetic ecology
- 2004 Bo Barker Jørgensen (Germany) , marine ecology
- 2005 Robert D. Holt (United States) , terrestrial ecology
- 2006 Winfried Lampert (Germany) , limnetic ecology
- 2007 Daniel Pauly (Canada) , marine ecology
- 2008 Monica Turner (United States) , terrestrial ecology
- 2009 Brian Moss (United Kingdom) , limnetic ecology
- 2010 Paul Falkowski (United States) , marine ecology
- 2011 Georgina Mace (United Kingdom) , terrestrial ecology
- 2012 Alan Hildrew (United Kingdom) , limnetic ecology
- 2013 Antje Boetius (Germany) , marine ecology
- 2014 William H. Schlesinger (United States) , terrestrial ecology
- 2015 John Smol (Canada) , limnetic ecology
- 2016 Jane Lubchenco (United States) , marine ecology
- 2017 Kevin Gaston (United Kingdom) , terrestrial ecology
- 2018 Lars Tranvik (Sweden) , freshwater ecology
- 2019 Nils Christian Stenseth (Norway) , marine ecology
- 2023 William J. Sutherland (United Kingdom) , terrestrial ecology
- 2025 Erik Jeppesen (Denmark) , freshwater ecology

== See also ==
- List of ecology awards
- List of environmental awards
