= Robert Peters =

Robert Peters may refer to:

- Robert Peters (bigamist) (1918–2005), British conman and de-frocked minister
- Robert Peters (writer) (1924–2014), American poet, critic, scholar, actor and playwright
- Robert G. Peters (1925–1999), member of the Georgia House of Representatives
- Bob Peters (1937–2021), American ice hockey coach
- Robert Peters (RAF officer) (born 1940), Royal Air Force officer
- Robert Henry Peters (1946–1996), Canadian ecologist and limnologist
- Robert L. Peters (1954–2023), Canadian graphics designer and industrial designer
- Robert Peters (actor) (born 1961), American actor and director
- Robert Peters (cyclist) (born 1970), Antiguan cyclist
- Robert O. Peters (born 1973), Nigerian film producer, director and actor
- Robert Peters (Illinois politician) (born 1985), member of the Illinois Senate
