= Water Research Institute (Verbania) =

Research institute in Verbania, Italy

Coordinates: 45°55′26″N 8°32′54″E

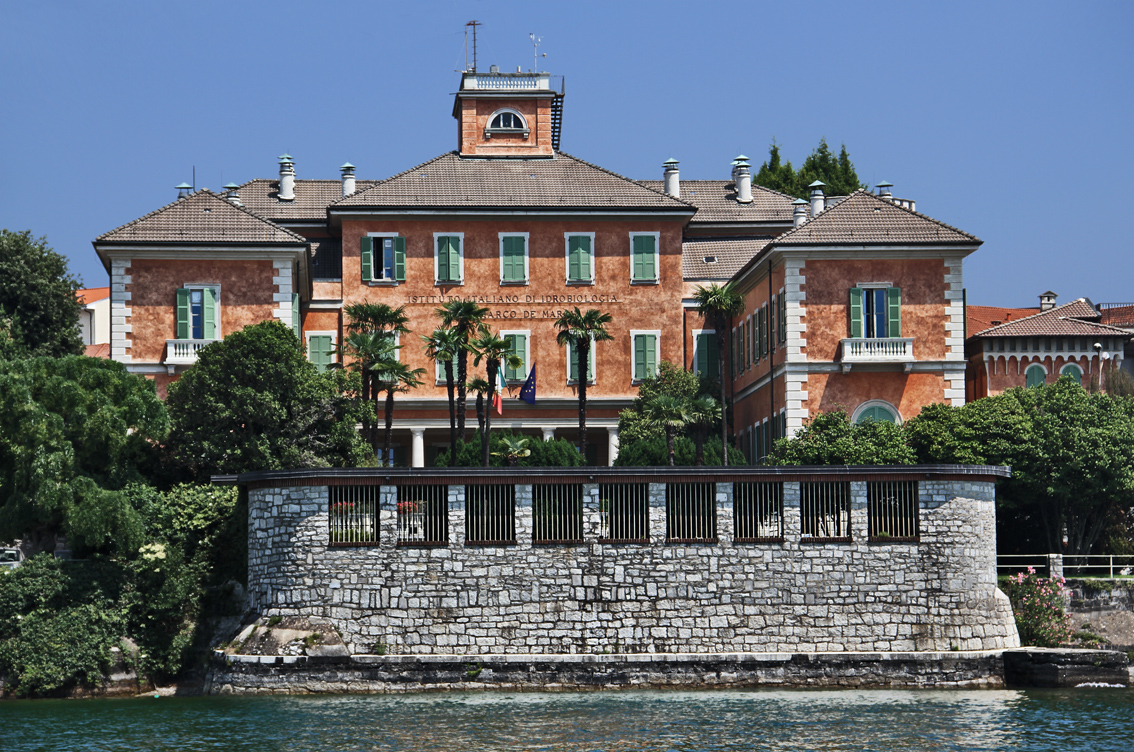
The headquarters of the institute in Verbania in 2011

The Water Research Institute (Italian: Istituto di Ricerca sule Acque abbreviated IRSA) in Verbania Pallanza is part of the Water Research Institute of CNR, with headquarters in Rome. From 2002 to 2018 it represented the headquarters of the former Institute of Ecosystem Study (Italian: Istituto per lo Studio degli Ecosistemi, abbreviated ISE), one of the dismissed institutes of the Italian National Research Council (CNR). Before that, the institute in Verbania was called the Italian Institute of Hydrobiology.

== Research topics ==
Research at IRSA in Verbania is mostly on environmental issues, especially on:

- limnology, in all its aspects, including biological, physical, chemical,
- freshwater ecology,
- impact of global change,
- conservation and recovery of ecosystems,
- aquatic biodiversity and ecosystem functioning,
- biology and technology of microorganisms,
- applied ecology and biological control.

== History ==
The institute in Verbania Pallanza started working as a research center in 1938 on Lake Maggiore, as the Italian Institute of Hydrobiology, as a will of Rosa Curioni in memory of her husband, the limnologist Marco De Marchi, to whom the institute was dedicated.

During the Second World War life in the Institutes was difficult, due to economic shortages and lack of communication. Nevertheless, important scientists were based here during that time: Adriano Buzzati-Traverso, Luigi Luca Cavalli-Sforza, Vittorio Tonolli and Giuseppe Ramazzotti. In 1944 the genetics section started working on Drosophila. After the war, research in the institute became more focused on freshwater ecology. Several limnologists passed through the institute, most notably: Ramon Margalef, G. Evelyn Hutchinson, Richard Vollenweider, Charles Goldman, Robert G. Wetzel and W. Thomas Edmondson.

The Institute entered CNR in 1977, and in 2002 ISE started its existence, with the inclusion of the units in Firenze, Pisa and Sassari. From October 2018, the institute was dismantled and each of the research units of ISE was included in other institutes of CNR. The headquarters in Verbania became part of the Water Research Institute, IRSA.

== Publications ==
More than 2000 research papers have been published by the researchers of the institute, gathering more than 40,000 citations by the end of 2020.

The Journal of Limnology is the official international journal of the CNR-IRSA in Verbania. It publishes papers on limnology. It started in 1999 as a continuation of the Memorie dell’Istituto Italiano di Idrobiologia (1942–1998). It is currently published by PAGEPress, is completely free to read and is listed in the Directory of Open Access Journals (DOAJ).
