= Institute of Ecosystem Study =

Italian research institute

Coordinates: 45°55′26.454″N 8°32′53.506″E

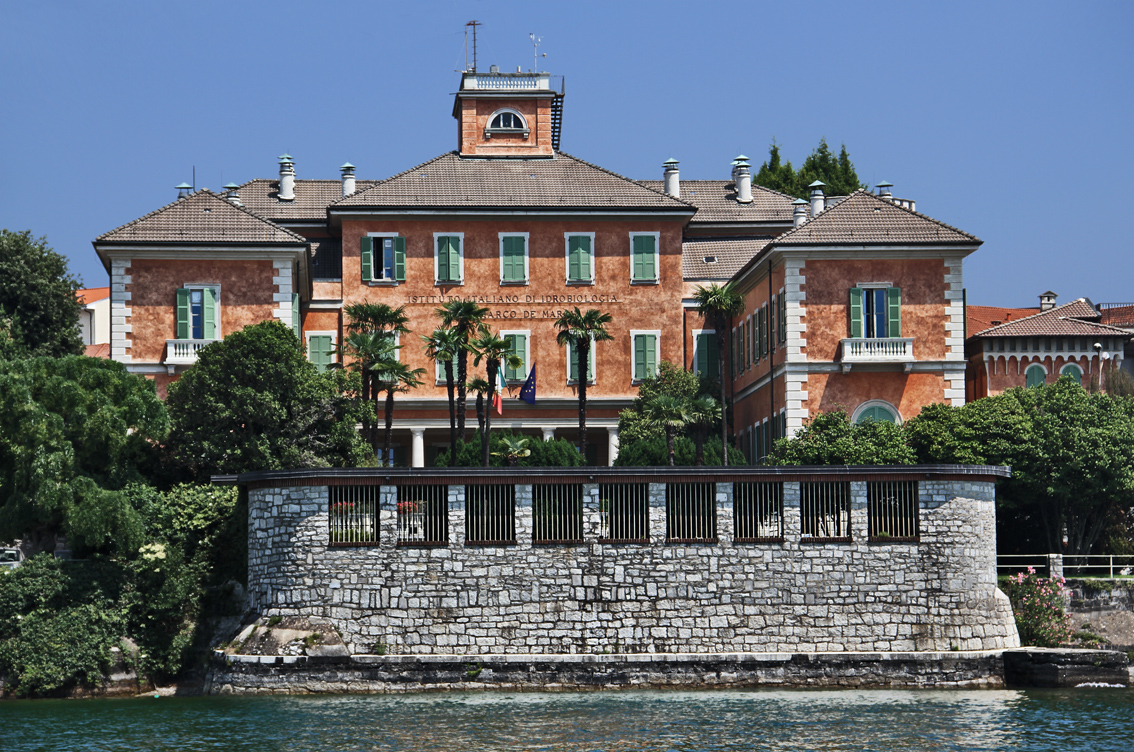
The headquarters of ISE in 2011

The Institute of Ecosystem Study (Italian: Istituto per lo Studio degli Ecosistemi, abbreviated ISE) was one of the institutes of the Italian National Research Council (CNR) from 2002 to 2018.

== Research topics ==
Research at ISE was mostly on environmental issues, especially on:

- impact of global change,
- conservation and recovery of ecosystems,
- freshwater ecology,
- soil functioning,
- biology and technology of photosyntethic microorganisms,
- applied ecology and biological pest control.

== Organisation and units ==
The four units of ISE were:

- The headquarters in Verbania-Pallanza, mostly dealing with limnology. It is now part of CNR IRSA.
- The unit in Florence, in the research area of Sesto Fiorentino, deals with population dynamics, in waters and soils. It is now part of CNR IRET.
- The unit in Pisa works on chemical, biochemical and physical aspects determining soil quality. It is now part of CNR IRET.
- The unit in Sassari, in the research area of Li Punti, works on integrated pest management. It is now part of CNR IRET.

== History ==
The headquarters of ISE in Verbania Pallanza started working as a research center in 1938 on Lake Maggiore, as the Italian Institute of Hydrobiology, as a will of Rosa Curioni in memory of her husband, the limnologist Marco De Marchi, to whom the institute was dedicated.

During the Second World War life in the Institutes was difficult, due to economic shortages and lack of communication. Nevertheless, important scientists were based here during that time: Adriano Buzzati-Traverso, Luigi Luca Cavalli-Sforza, Vittorio Tonolli and Giuseppe Ramazzotti. In 1944 the genetics section started working on Drosophila. After the war, research in the Institutes became more focused on freshwater ecology. Several limnologists passed through the institute, most notably: Ramon Margalef, G. Evelyn Hutchinson, Richard Vollenweider, Charles Goldman, Robert G. Wetzel and W. Thomas Edmondson.

The Institute entered CNR in 1977, and in 2002 ISE started its existence, with the inclusion of the units in Florence, Pisa and Sassari. From October 2018, the institute was dismantled and each of the research units of ISE was included in other institutes of CNR.

== Publications ==
The Journal of Limnology was the official international journal of the ISE headquarters in Verbania, and it is now the official international journal of IRSA. It publishes papers on limnology. It started in 1999 as a continuation of the Memorie dell’Istituto Italiano di Idrobiologia (1942–1998). It is currently published by PAGEPress, is completely free to read and is listed in the Directory of Open Access Journals (DOAJ).

Tropical Zoology was the official international journal of the unit in Firenze. It publishes papers on zoology in tropical areas. It started in 1988 as a continuation of the Monitore Zoologico Italiano (1966–1987). It is currently published by Taylor&Francis.

In the last thirty years the researchers of ISE published more than 2,000 scientific papers, resulting in more than 40,000 citations.
