= Nils Christian Stenseth =

Norwegian biologist

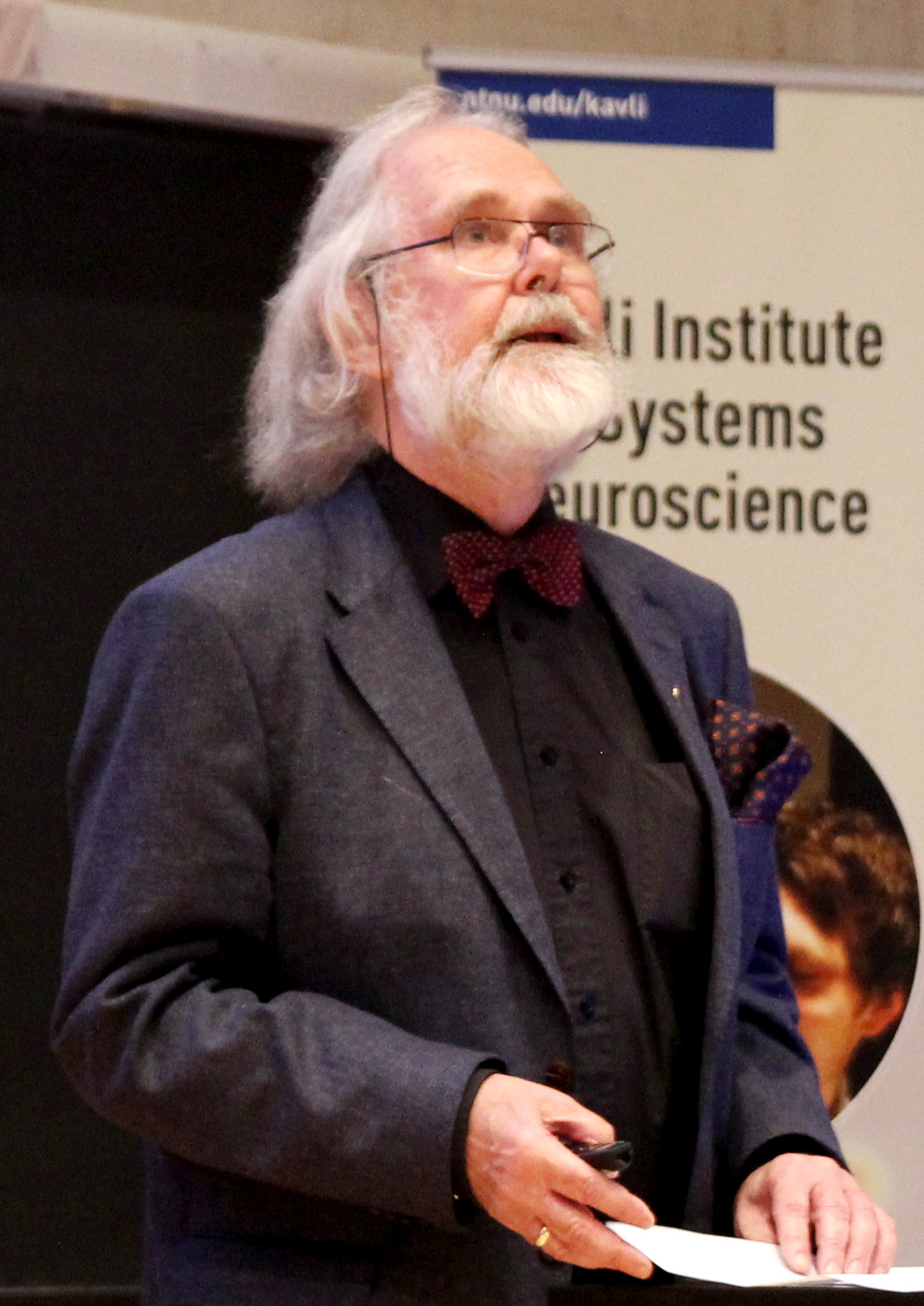
Nils Christian Stenseth in 2014

Nils Christian Stenseth (born 29 July 1949 in Fredrikstad, Norway) is a Norwegian biologist with a focus on ecology and evolution. He is the director of the Centre for Ecological and Evolutionary Synthesis (CEES) at the University of Oslo, CEES was given Centre of Excellence status by the Research Council of Norway in December 2006. He is also the Chief Scientist at the Norwegian Institute of Marine Research in Norway, and Honorary Professor of Tsinghua University.

In 2019, he was awarded the ECI Prize of the International Ecology Institute. In 2020, he was awarded the Chinese International Science and Technology Cooperation Award.

== Background and education ==
Stenseth finished his first degree in 1972 at the University of Oslo with main topics biology, zoology and mathematics. He then went on with his doctoral degree at the same university, studying under amongst others John Maynard Smith the University of Sussex, still working mostly on the theoretical aspects of evolution and ecology. Major publications from this period is his work on the Red Queen Hypothesis (Van Valen, 1973; Stenseth, 1979; Stenseth and Maynard-Smith, 1984) in addition to his work on population cycles of the Norwegian lemming. A dr.philos. since 1978, he was appointed as a professor of population ecology and zoology at the University of Oslo in 1980. He later turned to more empirical investigations, and as chair of CEES he continues to be a well-known and respected scientist within biology. He is an ISI Highly Cited researcher within Ecology/Environment.

He was the vice-president/president of the Norwegian Academy of Science and Letters from 2009 to 2014. He is also a visiting scholar for the Chinese Academy of Sciences, a member of the Royal Norwegian Society of Sciences and Letters, the French Academy of Sciences and the Academia Europaea. He holds an honorary degree at the University of Antwerp.
