= Aylestone School =

Location
- Broadlands House, Broadlands Lane; Hereford, Herefordshire, HR1 1HY; England; 52°03′52″N 2°41′46″W

Information
- Type: Community school
- Established: 1976
- Local authority: Herefordshire
- Department for Education URN: 116936 Tables
- Ofsted: Reports
- Executive Headteacher: Simon Robertson
- Gender: Co-educational
- Age: 11 to 16
- Enrolment: 419
- Houses: Mortimer, Clare, Delacy, Coningsby
- Website: www.aylestone.hereford.sch.uk

Aylestone School is a co-educational secondary school in Herefordshire, England. The school has an enrolment of 419, and caters for the Key Stage 3 and Key Stage 4 education of students aged 11–16.

== History ==
The school was established as the comprehensive Aylestone School following the merger of Hereford High School for Girls and Hereford High School for Boys in 1976. The school was known as Aylestone High School before it was renamed Aylestone Business and Enterprise College in the 2000s following the introduction of Business and Enterprise Colleges as part of the specialist schools programme. In 2017, the school's name reverted to Aylestone School.

The school's administration building is Broadlands House, a 19th-century Grade II listed building.

== Governance ==
Along with Broadlands Primary School and Withington Primary School, Aylestone School forms a federation with a single governing body. The school is led by an executive headteacher, Simon Robertson, and a team of twelve governors. A student council consists of a representative from each tutor group.

== School structure ==
=== Admissions ===
The school has an enrolment of 419 students. It is co-educational; approximately 53% of students are female and 47% male. Entrance is non-selective. The school's catchment area lies primarily to the north of Hereford in the Lugg valley, and covers the outlying settlements of Wellington to the north west, Withington to the east, and Hereford city centre to the south.

=== Academic ===
The Key Stage 3 (KS3) curriculum includes English, Mathematics, Science, Humanities (History, Geography, Religious Education, and Empowerment), Modern Foreign Languages (MFL), Art and Design, Computing, Music, Physical Education, and Design and Technology. At Key Stage 4 (KS4), the curriculum is widened to cover the mandatory subjects of both English Language and English Literature, the specific science disciplines of Biology, Chemistry, and Physics, and Issues and Ethics subjects including PSHE, Sex Education, Citizenship and Careers. Optional courses introduced at KS4 include Business Studies, specific technology disciplines such as Food Technology and Resistant Materials, Psychology, as well as BTEC qualifications in Music and Sport and Leisure.

During the 2019–2020 academic year, the school employed 59 full- and part-time staff, including 33 teachers, 13 teaching assistants, and 13 members of non-classroom support staff. The pupil–teacher ratio at this time was 12.8:1.

==== Attainment ====
The school's 2016 and 2018 Ofsted inspections showed that it "requires improvement". Monitoring inspections in 2019 and 2021 found that the senior leaders and governors were taking "effective action" for improvement. The school's Progress 8 benchmark score is deemed to be "well below average" and is in the lowest 12% of schools in England. The school's Attainment 8 and EBacc scores are also below the national average. At GCSE level, 16% of student attain Grade 5 or above compared to the national average of 43%. In previous Ofsted inspections, the school was described as "good" or "satisfactory".

=== Pastoral ===
The school uses a house system, comprising four houses:

- Mortimer
- Clare
- Delacy
- Coningsby

The houses compete in events throughout the academic year, including cookery, poetry, and language competitions, as well as sports day.

== Former pupils ==
- Paul Keetch, Liberal Democrat Member of Parliament for Hereford (1997–2010)
- Lucy Letby, serial killer
- Josh McNally, rugby union player (England, Bath)
- Susan Powell, broadcast meteorologist (BBC Weather)
- Jo Stone-Fewings, actor (Royal Shakespeare Company)
- Rachel Whitear, drug overdose victim, known for a mass drug awareness campaign in UK schools

== Former headteachers and notable staff ==
At least five people have held the post of headteacher since the school's establishment in 1976, including Bob Howe, Tony Wray (1989–2003), Steve Byatt (2004–2007), and Sue Woodrow (2008–2015).

For a time in the 1970s, the school employed conman and bigamist Robert Peters as its head of Religious Education. Peters, who used his birthname (Robert Parkins) to take the role, formed a relationship with the Head of the Lower School (Note: In English secondary education, the term "lower school" covers Years 7, 8, and 9 (ages 11–14)) and they married. Peters left the school when his falsified qualifications were discovered.
