= Marianne V. Moore =

American aquatic ecologist

- Born: Marianne Voigt Moore; Mediapolis, Iowa
- Other names: M. V. Moore, Marianne Rodenhouse
- Occupation: marine ecologist
- Years active: 1978-2017
- Known for: Lake Baikal project development

Marianne Voigt Moore is an American aquatic ecologist, whose area of expertise is the threat posed to lakes from manmade origins. She was awarded the Ramón Margalef Award for Excellence in Education in 2015 for an innovative teaching program she designed which combines cultural and scientific research to give students an interdisciplinary understanding of the impact of changes in lake habitat to organisms in the water, as well as the people who populate the shores surrounding the lake.

== Early life ==
Marianne Voigt Moore, daughter of Marjorie and Max Moore and named after the poet Marianne Moore, was raised on her family farm in Mediapolis, Iowa. From an early age, she had a fascination with animals and insects. After completing her primary education and graduating from Mediapolis High School, she enrolled in Colorado College. During her second year of schooling, she participated in a summer research class on aquatic invertebrate zoology and became interested in the microorganisms which populated the lake on the Minnesota-Canada border, where the research facility was located. Completing her bachelor's degree, cum laude, in biology in 1975, she went on to work on a master's degree at Iowa State University. Under the tutelage of Roger W. Bachmann, Moore studied the effects of by-products from a nearby meat processing plant on the Iowa River and earned her degree in limnology in 1977. That year, winning a Fulbright-Hays fellowship, she began her doctoral research studying zooplankton in freshwater lakes in New Zealand at the University of Canterbury in Christchurch.

== Career ==
Returning from her year abroad, Moore worked as a research assistant to Bachmann at Iowa State University, completing a survey of 115 of the public lakes in the state. The study became the baseline for lake restoration projects in Iowa. The following year, she went to Hanover, New Hampshire and began work on her PhD at Dartmouth College, where she also worked as a teaching assistant. She completed her dissertation in 1986, under John J. Gilbert, graduating with her doctorate in aquatic ecology in 1986. From 1986 to 1988, Moore worked at Miami University in Oxford, Ohio, as a research fellow and instructor.

In 1988, Moore was hired as an assistant professor at Wellesley College in the biology department, moving to Wellesley, Massachusetts with her husband, Nick Rodenhouse, who was also accepted to teach at Wellesley. While he researched migratory birds and the effects of climate change upon them, Moore continued her research into zooplankton, studying nearby Lake Waban. Her research encompassed analyzing the effect of light pollution on lake organisms. In 1995, Moore met Thomas Hodge, a professor of Russian, and they conceived of an idea to develop a cross-cultural, interdisciplinary research program which would combine humanities students' cultural studies with biology students' research activities focused on Lake Baikal in Siberia. In 1997, Moore became an associate professor and three years later, she and Hodge drew up a syllabus for their course proposal. She received the Anna and Samuel Pinanski Prize for teaching excellence from Wellesley in 1998 and the following year was honored with the Apgar Award for Innovation in Teaching.

In 2000, Moore and Hodge went to Lake Baikal and discovered that Irkutsk State University owned a small derelict research station in the village of Bolshiye Koty. With plans for a Russian team to rehabilitate the building, the duo prepared their course and took the first students to the site in 2001. At that time, she heard about a data record which had been kept on the lake water for around sixty years, but thinking there had been an error in translation, she ignored the report. Two years later, when she and student returned to the site, she learned that Mikhail M. Kozhov began collecting weekly samples from the lake in 1945. Later assisted by his daughter, Olga M. Kozhova and granddaughter, Lyubov Izmest'eva, the data had been collected in a year-round effort. Moore made contact with Stephanie E. Hampton, a colleague working at the University of Idaho. Hampton arranged for the University of California, Santa Barbara’s National Center for Ecological Analysis, to assist with analyzing the data on the World Heritage Site and finance the collaborative work. Surmounting logistical, language and cultural challenges, the team produced unique findings on the warming of the lake and the changes in species which inhabit the lake due to increased temperatures.

Expanding the program in 2011 with a grant from the National Science Foundation, scientists from Irkutsk State University began working with fifteen US scientists from five universities. The goal of the expanded project is to determine if native plankton species in the lake will adapt and thrive with climatic change, or whether warm-water species will replace them, recognizing that shifts in the plankton will impact higher species which feed from plankton and ultimately the entire ecosystem of the lake. Though Moore headed the team which evaluated zooplankton, she was also involved in analyzing "the world's only exclusively freshwater seal", pusa sibirica. When she and her graduate student, Ted Ozersky, discovered a collection of 400 seal skulls in a lab in Irkutsk, which had been collected since the 1960s, they sought permission to study them. Extracting teeth and analyzing the metal content with a mass spectrometer they discovered high levels of mercury and cadmium had jeopardized the health of the seals in the 1960s and 1970s. Endangering the seals, which are a primary food source for the indigenous Buryats, with toxic emissions from coal combustion, mining, and nuclear testing posed risks to the health of the entire food chain in and along the lake.

In 2012, Moore became a full professor at Wellesley and in 2014 was named the Camilla Chandler Frost Professor of Environmental Studies. Along with her students, she has studied algae growth along the coastline of the lake to determine the origin of nutrients for the algae. Initial studies determined that sewage in the streams feeding the lake were not a significant contributor, but later studies indicate that groundwater may be the source. In 2015, Moore was honored by the Association for the Sciences of Limnology and Oceanography, who conferred upon her their Ramón Margalef Award for Excellence in Education, for her development of the interdisciplinary, multi-institutional and multinational research project at Lake Baikal, which has allowed students learn research techniques while simultaneously developing their ability to critically analyze and create solutions for logistical problems, cultural sensitivity, and language obstacles. Moore retired from Wellesley in 2017.

== Selected publications ==
- Moore, Marianne V.; Gilbert, John J. (1987). "Age-specific Chaoborus predation on rotifer prey". Freshwater Biology. 17 (2): 223–236. doi:10.1111/j.1365-2427.1987.tb01044.x. ISSN 0046-5070.
- Moore, Marianne V. (April 1988). "Differential use of food resources by the instars of Chaoborus punctipennis". Freshwater Biology. 19 (2): 249–268. doi:10.1111/j.1365-2427.1988.tb00346.x. ISSN 1365-2427.
- Moore, Marianne V.; Folt, Carol F.; Stemberger, Richard S. (1996-01-22). "Consequences of elevated temperatures for zooplankton assemblages in temperate lakes". Archiv für Hydrobiologie. 135 (3): 289–319. doi:10.1127/archiv-hydrobiol/135/1996/289.
- Folt, C. L; Chen, C. Y.; Moore, Marianne V.; Burnaford, J. (May 1999). "Synergism and antagonism among multiple stressors". Limnology and Oceanography. 44 (3): 864–877. Bibcode:1999LimOc..44..864F. doi:10.4319/lo.1999.44.3_part_2.0864. ISSN 0024-3590. S2CID 8131329.
- Moore, Marianne V.; Pierce, Stephanie M.; Walsh, Hannah M.; Kvalvik, Siri K.; Lim, Julie D. (October 2000). "Urban light pollution alters the diel vertical migration of Daphnia". Internationale Vereinigung für Theoretische und Angewandte Limnologie: Verhandlungen. 27 (2): 779–782. doi:10.1080/03680770.1998.11901341. ISSN 0368-0770. S2CID 37873679.
