= Jordi Bascompte =

Professor of ecology

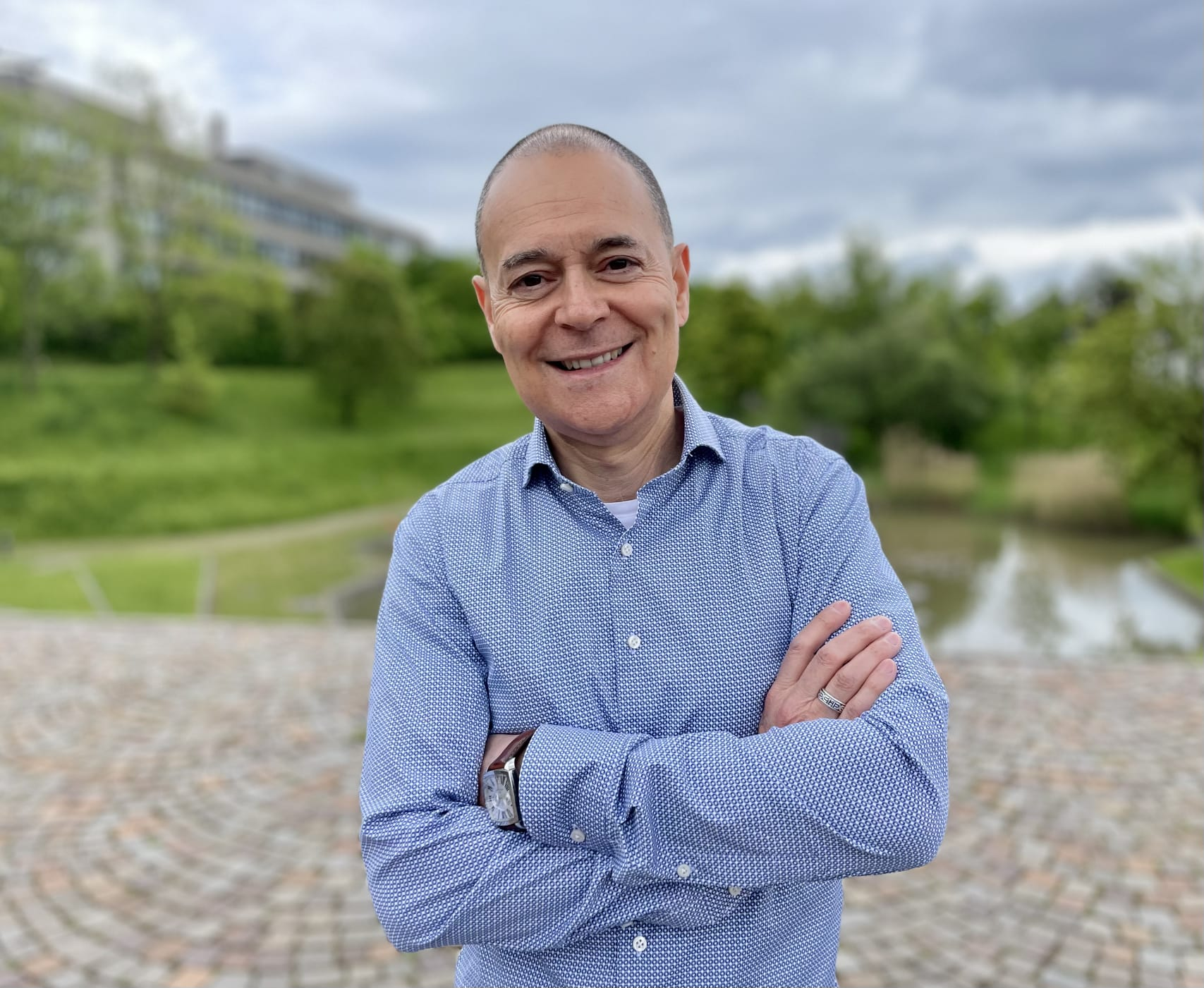
- Jordi Bascompte in 2015
- Born: 20 May 1967 (age 59); Olot, Spain
- Education: University of Barcelona (PhD and Master)
- Employer(s): University of Zurich; Spanish Research Council; National Center for Ecological Analysis and Synthesis; University of California, Irvine
- Known for: Mutualistic networks Architecture of biodiversity Metapopulations dynamics
- Website: bascompte.net

Jordi Bascompte (born in Olot on 20 May 1967) is a professor of ecology at the University of Zurich and the director of its specialized master's program on quantitative environmental sciences. He is best known for having brought the interactions of mutual benefit between plants and animals into community ecology, at the time largely dominated by predation and competition. His application of network theory to the study of mutualism has identified general laws that determine the way in which species interactions shape biodiversity.

== Early life and education ==
Jordi Bascompte was born in Olot, a small city in the province of Girona, Spain, characterized by its volcanic scenery. He grew up in Barcelona and become a keen bird watcher at a relatively young age, mainly due to the influence of a series of TV documentaries by the Spanish Naturalist Félix Rodríguez de la Fuente. Later on, he became acquainted with the work of the late ecologist Ramon Margalef, with whom he had a long-lasting interaction during his PhD studies at the University of Barcelona. Margalef ended up becoming his single most important scientific influence. Other scientists who had a strong influence on his work were developmental biologist Pere Alberch (who together with Margalef served in his PhD committee) and Nobel Prize winner Ilya Prigogine, whom he met at a summer school organized by the Universidad Complutense de Madrid.

== Career and research work ==
Bascompte's research combines theory and the analysis of large data sets to address basic and applied problems in ecology. During the early stages of his research, he studied the spatial dimension of population and community dynamics. This provided novel approximations to attempt to answer unresolved questions in conservation biology such as how much habitat can be destroyed before a metapopulation is driven regionally extinct, or how many patches are necessary for the persistence of a metapopulation.

Right after moving to Sevilla, his research shifted to the study of structure and dynamics of ecological networks. Bascompte applied network theory to the study of mutually beneficial interactions such as those between plants and their pollinators or seed dispersers, which provided a quantitative framework to address mutualism at the community level. The first stage of this research, was aimed at describing the structure of these networks. Together with Pedro Jordano and Jens Olesen, Bascompte showed that mutualistic networks display repeated structural patterns. This finding helped dismissing the somehow naïve assumption that mutualism has to lead to either highly specialized pairwise interactions or diffuse assemblages intractable to analysis. The immediate question was what ecological and environmental implications may these patterns have. Answering this question was hampered by the lack of a theoretical framework such as the one existing for competition or predation.

Bascompte joined forces with a group of theoretical physicists to build an analytical framework based on the concept of structural stability to assess the consequences of network structure for species coexistence and community robustness. These results showed that the architecture of mutualistic networks maximizes the number of coexisting species by increasing the relative role of facilitation over competition and that it increases the range of variability these communities can cope with before one or more species is driven extinct. These results led to thinking about mutualistic networks in terms of the architecture of biodiversity. Because many communities have already started losing species, however, it is not only important to know the range of perturbations these mutualistic networks can tolerate before start losing species, but also what is the rate of network collapse once extinctions start taking place.

Ironically, the very same interactions of mutual benefit that have contributed to the generation of such high values of biodiversity may hasten the rate at which such biodiversity is eroded. Specifically, species extinctions can lead to coextinction cascades -- groups of related species disappearing as a consequence of the extinction of species they depend on. Bascompte and colleagues showed that incorporating species interactions into climate change models not only increases the pool of species predicted to be driven extinct; it also changes the way extant species are selected from the evolutionary and functional trees, with potential implications for the functioning and robustness of the resulting communities.

In the last few years, Bascompte and his postdoc Rodrigo Cámara-Leret have used this network approach to map the knowledge that indigenous communities have about the services provided by surrounding plants and how this knowledge is shared among different languages. This work has shown that a large fraction of medicinal knowledge is unique to a single language and that those languages with unique medicinal knowledge are among the most endangered ones, which may compromise humanity's capacity for medicinal discovery.

== Books ==
- Self-Organization in Complex Ecosystems (with R. V. Solé)
- Mutualistic Networks (with P. Jordano)
- Evolución y Complejidad (with Bartolo Luque)
- Modeling Spatiotemporal Dynamics in Ecology (with R.V. Solé)

== Awards and honors ==
- European Young Investigator Award (2004)
- Ecological Society of America's George Mercer Award (2007)
- Rey Jaime I Award (2010)
- Spanish National Research Award (2011)
- British Ecological Society's Marsh Book of the Year Award (2016)
- Ramon Margalef Prize in Ecology (2021)
