= Erika Zavaleta =

American professor of ecology and evolutionary biology

- Education: Stanford University (BA, MS, PhD)
- Awards: Fellow, Ecological Society of America; Sustainability Science Award
- Scientific career
- Fields: Ecology; Conservation biology; Ecological anthropology; Climate change adaptation
- Workplaces: University of California, Santa Cruz
- Thesis: Influences of climate and atmospheric changes on plant diversity and ecosystem function in a California grassland (2001)
- Doctoral advisor: Harold Mooney; Christopher Field
- Website: people.ucsc.edu/~zavaleta/

Erika S. Zavaleta is an American professor of ecology and evolutionary biology at the University of California, Santa Cruz. Zavaleta is recognized for her research focusing on topics including plant community ecology, conservation practices for terrestrial ecosystems, and impacts of community dynamics on ecosystem functions.

== Early life and education ==
Zavaleta was born in New York. Both her parents immigrated to the United States to study; her father from Bolivia and her mother from India. Zavaleta spent time playing outside from a young age, influencing her early interest in science. She earned a bachelor's degree and Masters in Anthropology at Stanford University. For her thesis, Zavaleta studied the evolution of waterfowl conservation in the Yukon-Kuskokwim Delta with advisers William Durham and Donald Kennedy. Zavaleta earned her Ph.D. from Stanford University in biological services. Her doctoral mentors were Hal Mooney and Chris Field, with her dissertation focused on examining plant diversity and ecosystem functioning in a California grassland as influenced by climate and atmospheric changes.

== Career and research ==
Zavaleta is a Howard Hughes Medical Institute Professor and MacArthur Foundation Chair of Ecology and Evolutionary Biology at the University of California Santa Cruz (UCSC). She also serves as the Faculty Director for the UCSC Doris Duke Conservation Scholars Program, which is a conservation leadership program supporting a diverse group of undergraduate college students. In 2018, Zavaleta founded and serves as the faculty director of the center to Advance Mentored, Inquiry-Based Opportunities (CAMINO) at UCSC to promote inclusive and accessible research experiences, and provide resources and mentoring for students interested in the ecology and conservation fields. Zavaleta is also vice-president of the California Fish and Game Commission, appointed by California Gov. Gavin Newsom in April 2021. She co-chairs the commission's Wildlife Committee.

From 2001 to 2003, Zavaleta was a David H. Smith Conservation Research Fellow of The Nature Conservancy

Zavaleta is known for her research in environmental change at both global and regional scales, ecology and biodiversity, ecosystems functions, and conservation practice. Projects include seeking to understand how global climate changes affect terrestrial ecosystems, analyzing ecosystem stewardship and effective conservation practice in response to global climate changes, and studying the impacts of biodiversity loss. Zavaleta's paper Consequences of Changing Biodiversity examines the impact of human caused extinctions in decreasing the resiliency of ecosystems and thus the services humans can gain from these ecosystems. In Biodiversity Management in the Face of Climate Change: A Review of 22 Years of Recommendations, Zavaleta reviews literature addressing adaptation to climate change, and identifies trends to provide recommendations for conservation management. Zavaleta analyses secondary impacts in ecosystems of the eradication of invasive species to provide recommendations to prevent adverse unintended impacts in her paper Viewing Invasive Species Removal in a Whole-Ecosystem Context.

== Awards and honors ==
- 2021 Ecological Society of America Commitment to Human Diversity in Ecology. Zavaleta was recognized by the Ecological Society of America for her contributions toward increasing the diversity of future ecologists through mentoring, teaching, and outreach.
- 2018 Ecological Society of America Fellow. Zavaleta was recognized by the Ecological Society of America for her contributions to research and teaching in her field.
- 2017 Howard Hughes Medical Institute Professor. This award recognizes Zavaleta's effective engagement of students in research, and provides funding for programming to increase accessibility of science.
- 2017 Commonwealth Club of California 86th Annual California Book Awards Gold Metal. Zavaleta, along with Harold Mooney, were recognized in the Contribution to Publishing category for co-authoring the textbook Ecosystems of California.
- 2017 American Publishers' Association Award, Excellence in Physical Sciences and Mathematics, Excellence in Environmental Science. These awards recognize Zavaleta and Mooney's Ecosystems of California as outstanding scholarly work.
- 2008 Ecological Society of America Sustainability Science Award. Zavaleta was recognized as a co-author of the paper Policy strategies to address sustainability of Alaskan boreal forests in response to a directionally changing climate, as a paper integrating social and ecological sciences having notable impact contributing to ecosystem and regional sustainability.

== Select publications ==
- Chapin, F. Stuart III; Zavaleta, Erika S.; Eviner, Valerie T.; Naylor, Rosamond L.; Vitousek, Peter M.; Reynolds, Heather L.; Hooper, David U.; Lavorel, Sandra; Sala, Osvaldo E. (May 2000). "Consequences of changing biodiversity". Nature. 405 (6783): 234–242. Bibcode:2000Natur.405..234C. doi:10.1038/35012241. hdl:11336/37401. ISSN 0028-0836. PMID 10821284. S2CID 205006508.
- Zavaleta, Erika S.; Hobbs, Richard J.; Mooney, Harold A. (August 1, 2001). "Viewing invasive species removal in a whole-ecosystem context". Trends in Ecology & Evolution. 16 (8): 454–459. doi:10.1016/S0169-5347(01)02194-2. ISSN 0169-5347.
- Shaw, M. Rebecca; Zavaleta, Erika S.; Chiariello, Nona R.; Cleland, Elsa E.; Mooney, Harold A.; Field, Christopher B. (December 6, 2002). "Grassland Responses to Global Environmental Changes Suppressed by Elevated CO2". Science. 298 (5600): 1987–1990. Bibcode:2002Sci...298.1987S. doi:10.1126/science.1075312. ISSN 0036-8075. PMID 12471257. S2CID 2517996.
- Zavaleta, Erika S.; Hulvey, Kristin B. (November 12, 2004). "Realistic Species Losses Disproportionately Reduce Grassland Resistance to Biological Invaders". Science. 306 (5699): 1175–1177. Bibcode:2004Sci...306.1175Z. doi:10.1126/science.1102643. ISSN 0036-8075. PMID 15539600. S2CID 11818256.
- Lindenmayer, David; Hobbs, Richard J.; Montague‐Drake, Rebecca; Alexandra, Jason; Bennett, Andrew; Burgman, Mark; Cale, Peter; Calhoun, Aram; Cramer, Viki; Cullen, Peter; Driscoll, Don; Fahrig, Lenore; Fischer, Joern; Franklin, Jerry; Haila, Yrjo (January 2008). "A checklist for ecological management of landscapes for conservation". Ecology Letters. 11 (1): 78–91. doi:10.1111/j.1461-0248.2007.01114.x. ISSN 1461-023X.
- Jones, Holly P.; Tershy, Bernie R.; Zavaleta, Erika S.; Croll, Donald A.; Keitt, Bradford S.; Finkelstein, Myra E.; Howald, Gregg R. (February 2008). "Severity of the Effects of Invasive Rats on Seabirds: A Global Review". Conservation Biology. 22 (1): 16–26. doi:10.1111/j.1523-1739.2007.00859.x. ISSN 0888-8892.
- Funk, Jennifer L.; Cleland, Elsa E.; Suding, Katherine N.; Zavaleta, Erika S. (December 1, 2008). "Restoration through reassembly: plant traits and invasion resistance". Trends in Ecology & Evolution. 23 (12): 695–703. Bibcode:2008TEcoE..23..695F. doi:10.1016/j.tree.2008.07.013. ISSN 0169-5347. PMID 18951652.
- Isbell, Forest; Calcagno, Vincent; Hector, Andy; Connolly, John; Harpole, W. Stanley; Reich, Peter B.; Scherer-Lorenzen, Michael; Schmid, Bernhard; Tilman, David (August 10, 2011). "High plant diversity is needed to maintain ecosystem services" (PDF). Nature. 477 (7363): 199–202. Bibcode:2011Natur.477..199I. doi:10.1038/nature10282. hdl:11299/176833. ISSN 0028-0836. PMID 21832994. S2CID 4326167.
- Naeem, Shahid; Duffy, J. Emmett; Zavaleta, Erika (June 15, 2012). "The Functions of Biological Diversity in an Age of Extinction". Science. 336 (6087): 1401–1406. Bibcode:2012Sci...336.1401N. doi:10.1126/science.1215855. ISSN 0036-8075. PMID 22700920. S2CID 3778674.

== Personal life ==
Zavaleta has four children with her spouse Bernie. Her family lives in Santa Cruz, California.
