= Isabelle Chuine =

French ecologist and researcher

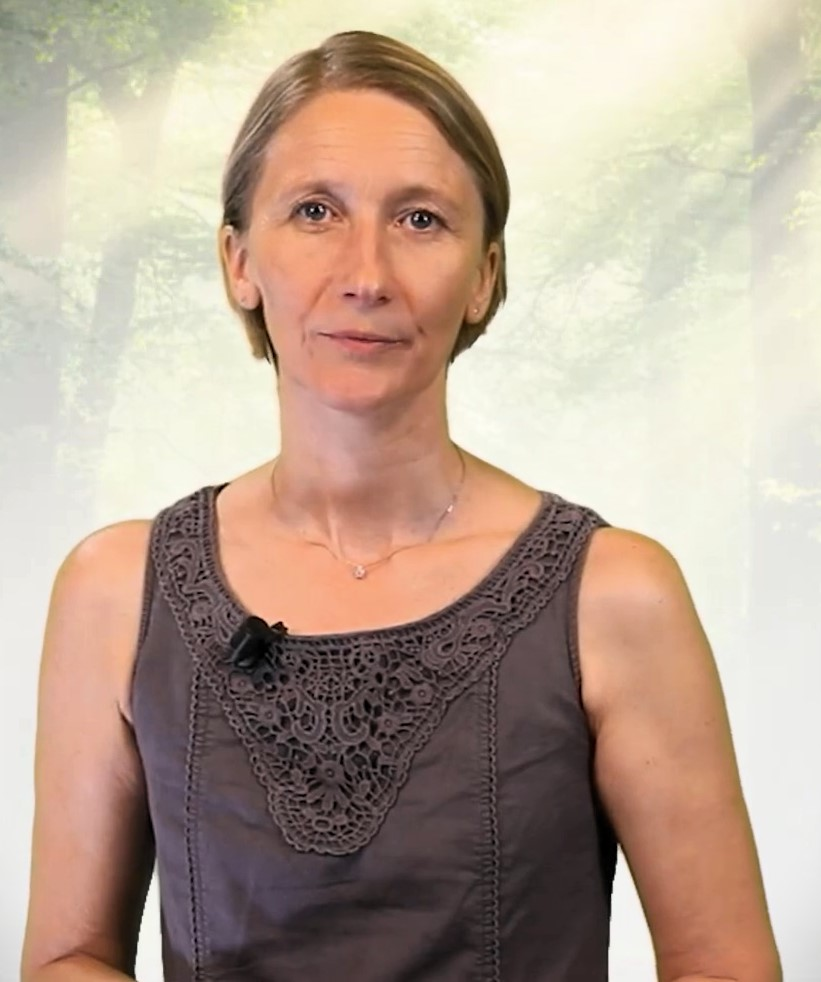
- Chuine in 2023
- Born: 1973 (age 52–53)
- Education: University of Montpellier
- Scientific career
- Workplaces: French National Centre for Scientific Research
- Thesis: MODELISATION DE LA PHENOLOGIE DES ARBRES DE LA ZONE TEMPEREE ET SES IMPLICATIONS EN BIOLOGIE EVOLUTIVE (1998)

Isabelle Chuine (born 1973) is a French ecologist who is a French National Centre for Scientific Research Research Director at the Center for Functional and Evolutionary Ecology. Her research consider how plants respond to climate change, and the traits that allow certain species to adapt.

== Early life and education ==
Chuine studied evolution and ecology at the University of Montpellier. She remained there for a doctorate in evolutionary biology, where she modelled the phrenology of temperate zone trees and studied how it impacted evolutionary biology.

== Research and career ==
Chuine joined the CNRS Délégation Languedoc-Roussillon. Chuine is a professor at the Center for Functional and Evolutionary Ecology. Her research considers the development cycle of extratropical trees. She has developed process-based species distribution models for plants, which she uses to understand how certain trees.

Chuine developed a citizen science programme Observatoire Des Saisons, which collects information about nature observations from people of all ages. The seasons observatory looks to raise public engagement about climate change and environmentalism, build datasets for scientific research and provide a mechanism for the public to understand the impact of climate change.

== Awards and honours ==
- 2006 Pierre & Cyril Grivet Prize of the French Academy of Sciences
- 2009 CNRS Bronze Medal
- 2018 Bullard Fellow of Harvard University
- 2019 Research prize of the French Society of Ecology and Evolution
- 2020 CNRS Silver Medal
- 2020 Elected Fellow of the French Academy of Agriculture
- 2020 Elected Fellow of the French Academy of Sciences
- 2022 Legion of Honour

== Selected publications ==
- Elsa E Cleland; Isabelle Chuine; Annette Menzel; Harold A Mooney; Mark D Schwartz (2 May 2007). "Shifting plant phenology in response to global change". Trends in Ecology & Evolution. 22 (7): 357–365. doi:10.1016/j.tree.2007.04.003. ISSN 0169-5347. PMID 17478009. Wikidata Q34625306.
- Isabelle Chuine (1 October 2010). "Why does phenology drive species distribution?" (PDF). Philosophical Transactions of the Royal Society B. 365 (1555): 3149–3160. doi:10.1098/rstb.2010.0142. ISSN 0962-8436. PMC 2981946. PMID 20819809. Wikidata Q33685177.
- Carsten F. Dormann; Stanislaus J. Schymanski; Juliano Cabral; et al. (13 January 2012). "Correlation and process in species distribution models: bridging a dichotomy". Journal of Biogeography. 39 (12): 2119–2131. doi:10.1111/j.1365-2699.2011.02659.x. ISSN 0305-0270. Wikidata Q57019842.
