= Louis Legendre (oceanographer) =

Canadian oceanographer (born 1945)

- Born: 16 February 1945 (age 81); Montreal, Quebec, Canada
- Citizenship: Canadian
- Education: Université de Montréal; Dalhousie University
- Scientific career
- Fields: Biological oceanography; Marine biogeochemistry; Numerical ecology
- Workplaces: Laval University; French National Centre for Scientific Research; Pierre and Marie Curie University; Sorbonne University

Louis Legendre MSRC (French pronunciation: [lwi ləʒɑ̃dʁ]; born 16 February 1945) is a Canadian-trained oceanographer whose later career took him to France.

== Education ==
Legendre degreed in liberal arts (B.A.) and sciences (B.Sc., Zoology) at the University of Montreal in 1964 and 1967, respectively. He degreed in oceanography (Ph.D.) at Dalhousie University (Halifax, Canada) in 1971.

== Academic career ==
Legendre joined the faculty at Laval University in 1973, rising to full professor in 1981. In 2000, he joined the French National Centre for Scientific Research (CNRS), and was director of the Villefranche Oceanography Laboratory. In 2009, he took a position at the Pierre and Marie Curie University (as of 2018, Sorbonne University). He is a professor emeritus at Laval University and at Sorbonne University.

He is a Fellow of the Royal Society of Canada and a Knight of the Order of Saint-Charles.

== Select awards and honours ==
- 1985 – Prix Léo-Pariseau, ACFAS
- 1986 – Michel-Jurdant Prize (with Pierre Legendre), ACFAS
- 1988 – Fellow, Royal Society of Canada
- 1997 – Prix Marie-Victorin, Government of Quebec
- 1997 – Honorary Doctorate, University of Liège, Belgium
- 2001 – ECI Prize
- 2002 – Fellow, International Ecology Institute
- 2002 – G. Evelyn Hutchinson Award, Association for the Sciences of Limnology and Oceanography
- 2011 – Knight, Order of Saint-Charles, Principality of Monaco
- 2016 – Elected Fellow, European Academy of Sciences
- 2017 – Sustaining Fellow, Association for the Sciences of Limnology and Oceanography

== Selected publications ==
- Numerical Ecology (2012)
