= Michel Loreau =

Belgian-French Theoretical ecologist

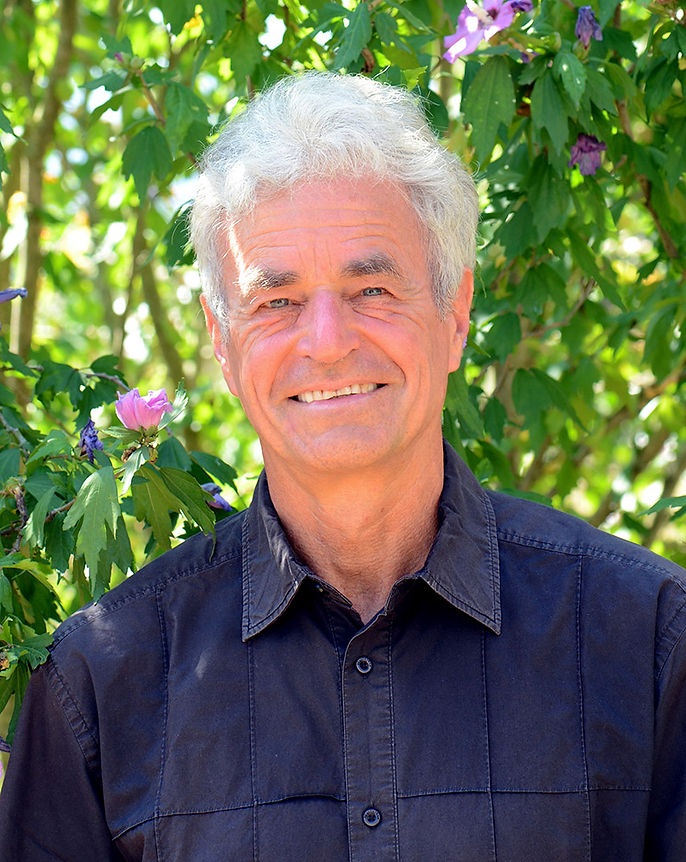
- Born: 22 April 1954 (age 72); Uccle, Belgium
- Citizenship: Belgian, French
- Education: Free University of Brussels
- Awards: International Ecology Institute Prize (2002); Silver Medal of the CNRS (2004); Fellow of the Royal Society of Canada (2010); Per Brinck Oikos Award (2011); Member of the Academia Europaea (2013); Queen Elizabeth II Diamond Jubilee Medal (2013); Grand Prix of the French Society of Ecology and Evolution (2019); ERC Advanced Grant (2015–2020); Honorary Member of the British Ecological Society (2020)
- Scientific career
- Fields: Theoretical ecology, ecosystem ecology, community ecology, evolutionary ecology
- Workplaces: National Centre for Scientific Research (CNRS); Peking University; McGill University; Pierre and Marie Curie University; Free University of Brussels
- Thesis: Les Niches Ecologiques des Carabides en Milieu Forestier à Lembeek (Belgique) (1983)

Michel Loreau (born 22 April 1954, in Uccle, Belgium) is a Belgian-French theoretical ecologist. As of 2023, he is an emeritus researcher at the Theoretical and Experimental Ecology Station of the National Centre for Scientific Research (CNRS) in Moulis (France) and adjunct professor at Peking University (China).

Loreau won the 2002 International Ecology Institute Prize in terrestrial ecology. He was elected a member of the Academia Europaea, (Note: Section: Ecology and Evolution) in 2013 and a Fellow of the Royal Society of Canada in 2010. In 2019, Loreau won the Grand Prix of the French Society of Ecology and Evolution (jointly with Jean Clobert). He was listed as a Highly Cited Researcher in Ecology/Environment from 2007 to 2019. In 2020, he was named an honorary member of the British Ecological Society.

== Education ==
Loreau obtained a Master of Zoological Sciences (1976) and a doctorate in science (1987) from the Free University of Brussels. His doctoral research focused on the ecological niches of carabid beetles in forest ecosystems.

== Career ==
Loreau was a research assistant (1977–1978, 1980–1983) of the National Fund for Scientific Research (FNRS, Belgium). He held positions as lecturer (1987–1996) at the Free University of Brussels, and served as programme manager at the Science Policy Office from 1990 to 1992.

He was professor at Pierre and Marie Curie University (Paris, France) from 1994 to 2005, reaching exceptional-grade professor in 2002. From 2005 to 2011, he was full professor and Tier 1 Canada Research Chair in Theoretical Community and Ecosystem Ecology at McGill University. From 2011 to 2022, he was a senior researcher at CNRS.

Loreau directed the Centre for Biodiversity Theory and Modelling at CNRS (2011–2017) and the Theoretical and Experimental Ecology Station at CNRS in Moulis, France (2016-2022).

=== Research ===
Loreau's early career focused on field ecology (specialising in ground beetles) before moving to theoretical ecology. Loreau has advocated for an integrative approach that seeks to bridge population, community, evolutionary, and ecosystem ecology, as outlined in his book From Populations to Ecosystems (2010). Much of his research has focused on the relationship between biodiversity loss and its effects on ecosystem functioning, ecosystem stability, and the sustainability of human societies (a field that has grown substantially since its emergence). He has held roles in several national and international initiatives related to biodiversity and ecosystem science. His work has also contributed to the development of other research areas, including metacommunity and metaecosystem ecology, evolutionary ecosystem ecology, and the study of human–nature interactions.

His mathematical models are used to predict the outcomes of various degrees of biodiversity in terrestrial or aquatic ecosystems and to analyse the responses of experimental ecosystems in which biomass is measured in relation to plant biodiversity.

Loreau's European Research Council Advanced Grant project, titled "BIOSTASES" (BIOdiversity, STAbility and Sustainability in Spatial Ecological and Social-Ecological Systems), investigated how biodiversity contributes to the stability of ecosystems and human societies in the face of environmental change.

=== Science and policy work ===
Loreau initiated and chaired the Linking Community and Ecosystem Ecology (LINKECOL) programme of the European Science Foundation. He restructured and chaired DIVERSITAS, the international programme of biodiversity science, and chaired the Scientific Committee of the International Conference Biodiversity Science and Governance, organised by France under the patronage of Jacques Chirac and Koïchiro Matsuura, director-general of UNESCO. He initiated and chaired the consultative process towards an International Mechanism of Scientific Expertise on Biodiversity (IMoSEB), which gave birth to the Intergovernmental Science–Policy Platform on Biodiversity and Ecosystem Services (IPBES).

Loreau has argued that biodiversity research should receive the same degree of international coordination and funding as climate change research receives through the Intergovernmental Panel on Climate Change. In a 2006 article in Nature, he co-authored a letter signed by 19 biodiversity scientists making this case.

Loreau has advocated for a fundamental shift in the relationship between humanity and nature, arguing that the global biodiversity crisis has its origins in the separation between humans and nature at the core of modern civilization. He has contended that addressing biodiversity loss requires not only conservation policies and economic valuation of ecosystem services, but also an economy that accepts the limits of growth and a deeper reflection on human needs and humanity's place within nature.

== Selected publications ==
=== Books ===
- Desender, Konjev, Marc Dufrêne, Michel Loreau, Martin L. Luff, and Jean-Pierre Maelfait, eds. Carabid Beetles: Ecology and Evolution. Dordrecht: Kluwer Academic Publishers, 1994.
- Loreau, Michel, Shahid Naeem, and Pablo Inchausti, eds. Biodiversity and Ecosystem Functioning: Synthesis and Perspectives. Oxford: Oxford University Press, 2002.
- Naeem, Shahid, Daniel E. Bunker, Andy Hector, Michel Loreau, and Charles Perrings, eds. Biodiversity, Ecosystem Functioning, and Human Wellbeing: An Ecological and Economic Perspective. Oxford: Oxford University Press, 2009.
- Levin, Simon A., Stephen R. Carpenter, H. Charles J. Godfray, Ann P. Kinzig, Michel Loreau, Jonathan B. Losos, Brian Walker, and David S. Wilcove, eds. The Princeton Guide to Ecology. Princeton: Princeton University Press, 2009.
- Loreau, Michel. From Populations to Ecosystems: Theoretical Foundations for a New Ecological Synthesis. Monographs in Population Biology. Princeton: Princeton University Press, 2010.
- Loreau, Michel. The Challenges of Biodiversity Science. Excellence in Ecology. Oldendorf/Luhe: International Ecology Institute, 2010.
- Billé, Raphaël, Philippe Cury, Michel Loreau, and Virginie Maris. Biodiversité: Vers une Sixième Extinction de Masse. Montreuil: La Ville Brûle Editions, 2014.
- Loreau, Michel, Andy Hector, and Forest Isbell, eds. The Ecological and Societal Consequences of Biodiversity Loss. London: ISTE; Hoboken: John Wiley & Sons, 2022.
- Loreau, Michel. Comment l'Erosion de la Biodiversité Met en Péril les Sociétés. Ebook, Le Virus de la Recherche Collection. Grenoble, 2022.
- Loreau, Michel. Nature That Makes Us Human: Why We Keep Destroying Nature and How We Can Stop Doing So. New York: Oxford University Press, 2023.
- Loreau, Michel, Andy Hector, and Forest Isbell, eds. Les Conséquences Ecologiques et Sociétales de la Perte de Biodiversité. London: ISTE, 2024.
- Loreau, Michel. Comment la Terre Vie en Nous. Paris: L'Harmattan, 2024.

=== Selected journal articles ===
- Loreau, Michel, and Andy Hector. "Partitioning Selection and Complementarity in Biodiversity Experiments." Nature 412 (2001): 72–76.
- Loreau, Michel, Shahid Naeem, Pablo Inchausti, Jan Bengtsson, J. P. Grime, Andy Hector, David U. Hooper, Michael A. Huston, David Raffaelli, Bernhard Schmid, David Tilman, and David A. Wardle. "Biodiversity and Ecosystem Functioning: Current Knowledge and Future Challenges." Science 294 (2001): 804–808.
- Loreau, Michel, Nicolas Mouquet, and Andrew Gonzalez. "Biodiversity as Spatial Insurance in Heterogeneous Landscapes." Proceedings of the National Academy of Sciences 100 (2003): 12765–12770.
- Loreau, Michel, and Claire de Mazancourt. "Biodiversity and Ecosystem Stability: A Synthesis of Underlying Mechanisms." Ecology Letters 16, Supplement 1 (2013): 106–115.
- Cardinale, Bradley J., J. Emmett Duffy, Andrew Gonzalez, David U. Hooper, Charles Perrings, Patrick Venail, Anita Narwani, Georgina M. Mace, David Tilman, David A. Wardle, Ann P. Kinzig, Gretchen C. Daily, Michel Loreau, James B. Grace, Anne Larigauderie, Diane S. Srivastava, and Shahid Naeem. "Biodiversity Loss and Its Impact on Humanity." Nature 486 (2012): 59–67.
- Isbell, Forest, Vincent Calcagno, Andy Hector, John Connolly, W. Stanley Harpole, Peter B. Reich, Michael Scherer-Lorenzen, Bernhard Schmid, David Tilman, Jasper van Ruijven, Alexandra Weigelt, Brian J. Wilsey, Erika S. Zavaleta, and Michel Loreau. "High Plant Diversity Is Needed to Maintain Ecosystem Services." Nature 477 (2011): 199–202.
- Hatton, Ian A., Kevin S. McCann, John M. Fryxell, T. Jonathan Davies, Matteo Smerlak, Anthony R. E. Sinclair, and Michel Loreau. "The Predator–Prey Power Law: Biomass Scaling across Terrestrial and Aquatic Biomes." Science 349 (2015): 1070.
- Barbier, Matthieu, Jean-François Arnoldi, Guy Bunin, and Michel Loreau. "Generic Assembly Patterns in Complex Ecological Communities." Proceedings of the National Academy of Sciences 115 (2018): 2156–2161.
- Feng, Yanhao, Bernhard Schmid, Michel Loreau, David I. Forrester, Shili Fei, Junqing Zhu, Zhiyao Tang, Jianguo Zhu, Pu Hong, Chengjin Ji, Yongkai Shi, Haijun Su, Xiangcheng Xiong, Jing Xiao, Shaopeng Wang, and Jingyun Fang. "Multispecies Forest Plantations Outyield Monocultures across a Broad Range of Conditions." Science 376 (2022): 865–868.
- Loreau, Michel, Matthieu Barbier, Elise Filotas, Dominique Gravel, Forest Isbell, Samuel J. Miller, José M. Montoya, Shaopeng Wang, Raphaël Aussenac, Rachel Germain, Patrick L. Thompson, Andrew Gonzalez, and Laura E. Dee. "Biodiversity as Insurance: From Concept to Measurement and Application." Biological Reviews 96 (2021): 2333–2354.

== Awards ==
- The International Ecology Institute Prize in terrestrial ecology (2002)
- The Silver Medal of the National Centre for Scientific Research (France)
- The Agathon De Potter and Max Poll Prizes of the Royal Academy of Belgium
- Per Brinck Oikos Award (Sweden), 2011
- Tomlinson Science Award, McGill University, 2009
- The queen Elizabeth II Diamond Jubilee Medal, 2013
- Fellow of the Royal Society of Canada, 2010
- Grand Prix of the French Society of Ecology and Evolution (jointly with Jean Clobert), 2019
- Honorary Member of the British Ecological Society, 2020
