= Carlos M. Duarte =

Spanish marine biologist

Carlos Duarte
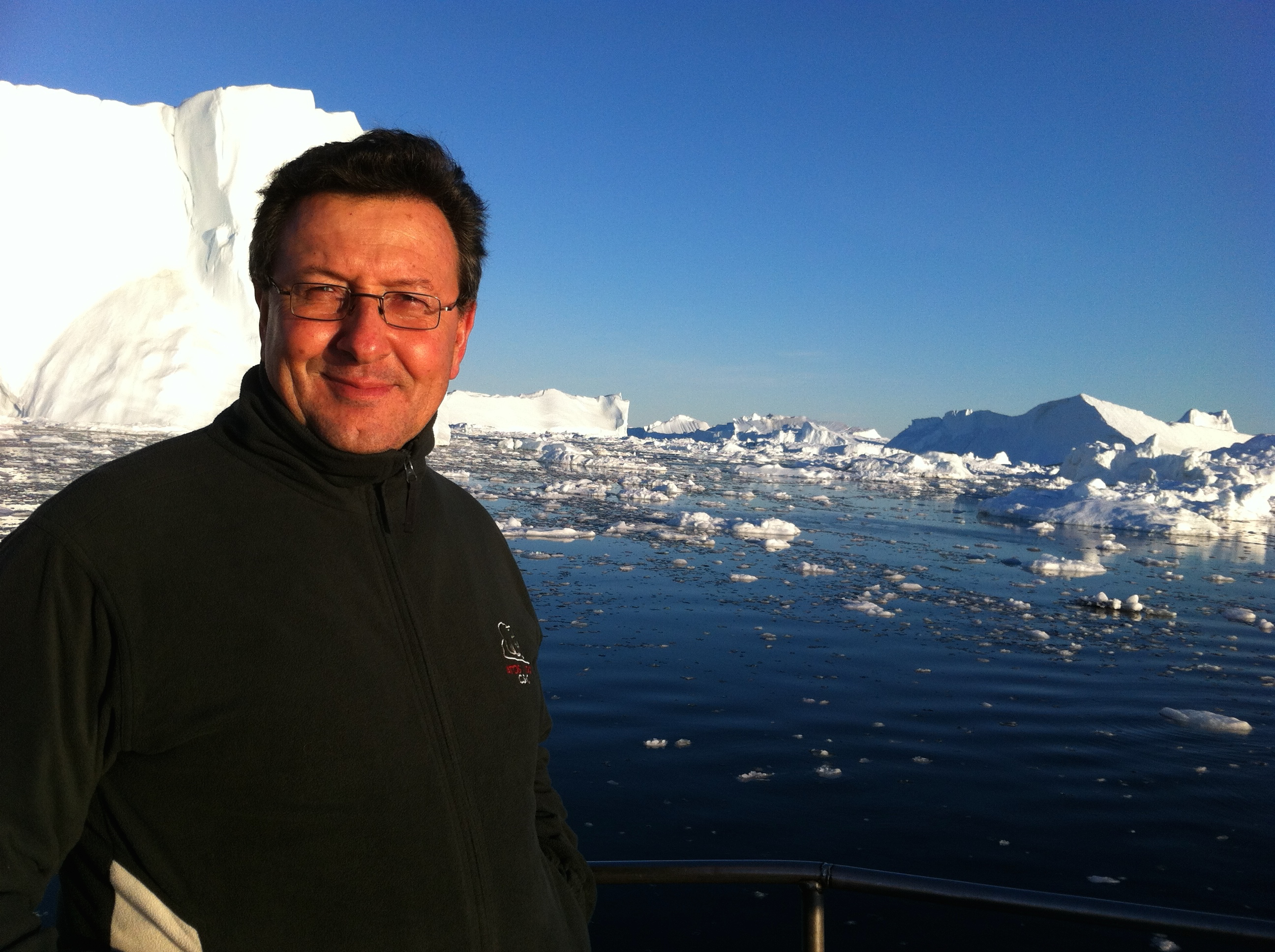
- Born: Carlos Manuel Duarte; July 27, 1960 (age 66); Lisbon, Portugal
- Education: Autonomous University of Madrid, McGill University
- Known for: Malaspina Expedition 2010, Scientific Basis for Blue Carbon
- Scientific career
- Fields: Biology, Ecology
- Workplaces: Marine scientist, Distinguished Professor, Tarek Ahmed Juffali Research Chair in Red Sea Ecology; Distinguished Professor of Marine Science, King Abdullah University of Science and Technology, Biological and Environmental Sciences and Engineering Division, Red Sea Research Center; Distinguished Professor of Marine Science, King Abdullah University of Science and Technology Computational Biology Research Center; Research Professor, Spanish National Research Council (on leave); Adjunct Professor, BioScience Department, Aarhus University, Denmark; Adjunct Professor, UWA Oceans Institute, University of Western Australia (Perth, Western Australia)
- Academic advisors: Jacob Kalff

Carlos Manuel Duarte is a marine ecologist conducting research on marine ecosystems globally, from polar to the tropical ocean and from near-shore to deep-sea ecosystems. His research addresses biodiversity in the oceans, the impacts of human activity on marine ecosystems, and the capacity of marine ecosystems to recover from these impacts. He is also interested in transdisciplinary research, collaborating with scientists and engineers across a broad range of fields to solve problems in the marine ecosystem and society. He is currently a Distinguished Professor at the King Abdullah University of Science and Technology and executive director of the Coral Research and Development Accelerator Platform.

== Education ==
Duarte earned a bachelor's degree in environmental biology from Autonomous University of Madrid, Spain, in 1982. In 1987, he obtained a Ph.D. in limnology from McGill University, advised by Jacob Kalff.

== Career ==
Upon receiving a Ph.D. in biology, Duarte returned to Spain where he was a postdoctoral researcher at the Instituto de Ciencias del Mar (1987–1989), to then take a position as staff researcher with the Spanish National Research Council therein, and move to the ranks to research professor while moving to the Blanes Centre for Advanced Studies (1989–1999), and to the Mediterranean Institute for Advanced Studies, Mallorca (1999–2015). In 2011 Duarte took the role of inaugural director, and Winthrop Professor, at the UWA Oceans Institute, University of Western Australia. In 2015 he joined the Biological and Environmental Science and Engineering Division and the Red Sea Research Center at King Abdullah University of Science and Technology, where he was appointed director of the Red Sea Research Center from 2016 to 2018. He also joined the Computational Biology Research Center there in 2017. He is the founding editor-in-chief of Frontiers in Marine Science, and served or has served in the editorial board of multiple scientific journals. He has published over 900 scientific papers and many books and book chapters and supervised a large number of students and early career researchers. He served as elected President of the American Society of Limnology and Oceanography, the largest professional society on marine sciences, and has received multiple awards and honors for his research contributions.

He has been recognized as a "Highly Cited Researcher", demonstrated by the production of multiple highly cited papers that rank in the top 1% by citations for a research field, in all the assessments conducted thus far, including the 2018 assessment, and in 2019 was ranked within the top 0.01% (ranked 887 among 7 million scientists evaluated) across all fields, the top ranked scientists in Marine Biology and Hydrology. In 2021 Duarte was ranked, by Reuters, as the 12th most influential climate scientist in the world. He was also ranked the 4th top scientist in Ecology and Evolution, and the top marine scientist in their rank. Since 2021 Duarte also serves as executive director for the Global Coral R&D Accelerator Platform, CORDAP. On October 27, 2021, Prof. Duarte has been appointed Academic with the Spanish Royal Academy of Sciences for his seminal contributions to further understanding marine ecosystems and their responses to global change.

== Research ==
Duarte was originally trained as a limnologist and has contributed to understanding the ecology of freshwater plants in rivers and lakes, as well as the role of freshwater ecosystems in carbon cycling. His research in the ecology and biogeochemistry of seagrass meadows and other vegetated coastal systems eventually lead – in collaboration with different UN agencies - to the development of "Blue carbon" strategies to mitigate climate change. Recognizing the many gaps in our understanding of the deep-sea pelagic ecosystem, Duarte led the Malaspina Circumnavigation Expedition, involving more than 500 scientists, and that sailed the oceans between 2010 and 2011 to provide a global assessment of the deep-sea pelagic ecosystem. The Malaspina Expedition 2010 has thus far released over 200 publications addressing different aspects of the biodiversity and function of the deep-sea ecosystem. In 2020, Duarte led an international team that, on the basis of evidences of responses of marine populations and habitats to the release of pressures, concluded that rebuilding the abundance of marine life by 2050 is an achievable Grand Challenge, and provided a road map to deliver this goal.

== Awards and distinctions ==
- 2025, Japan Prize in the field of "Biological Production, Ecology/Environment".
- 2021, Appointed Academic with Spanish Royal Academy of Sciences
- 2019, BBVA Foundation Frontiers of Knowledge Awards in the area of Ecology and Conservation Biology
- 2019, BBVA Foundation Frontiers of Knowledge Awards in the area of Ecology and Conservation Biology
- 2019, Ramon Margalef Prize in Ecology
- 2018, Appointed to the Global Advisory Board of "The Red Sea Project" of the Public Investment Fund of Saudi Arabia
- 2018, Elected Fellow to the European Academy of Science and Technology
- 2018, The Carlo Heip International Award for outstanding accomplishments in marine biodiversity science (World Marine Biodiversity Conference, Montreal)
- 2016, Elected Sustaining Fellow of the Association for the Sciences of Limnology and Oceanography
- 2016, Vladimir Ivanovich Vernadsky Medal for Excellence in Biogeosciences
- 2011, Honorari Doctorate from Utrecht University, The Netherlands
- 2011, Prix d'Excellence of the International Council for the Exploration of the Sea
- 2010, Honorari Doctorate from the Université du Québec à Montréal, Canadá
- 2009, King James I Award on Environmental Research
- 2007, Spanish National Science Award in Natural Resources
- 2001, G. Evelyn Hutchinson Award, American Society of Limnology and Oceanography

== Bibliography ==
Top 10 most cited papers of > 900 published papers:

- C.M. Duarte (1991). "Seagrass depth limits". Aquatic Botany. 40 (4): 363–377. Bibcode:1991AqBot..40..363D. doi:10.1016/0304-3770(91)90081-F.
- C.M. Duarte (1995). "Submerged aquatic vegetation in relation to different nutrient regimes". Ophelia. 41 (1): 87–112. doi:10.1080/00785236.1995.10422039.
- M.A. Hemminga; C.M. Duarte (2000). Seagrass Ecology. Cambridge University Press. p. 298. ISBN 978-0-521-66184-3.
- C.M. Duarte (2002). "The future of seagrass meadows". Environmental Conservation. 29 (2): 192–206. Bibcode:2002EnvCo..29..192D. doi:10.1017/S0376892902000127. hdl:10261/89840. S2CID 31971900.
- J.A. Downing; Y.T. Prairie; J.J. Cole; C.M. Duarte; L.J. Tranvik; R.G. Striegl; W.H. McDowell; P. Kortelainen; N.F. Caraco; J.M. Melack; J.J. Middelburg (2006). "The global abundance and size distribution of lakes, ponds, and impoundments". Limnology and Oceanography. 51 (5): 2388–2397. Bibcode:2006LimOc..51.2388D. doi:10.4319/lo.2006.51.5.2388.
- R.J. Orth; T.J. Carruthers; W.C. Dennison; C.M. Duarte; J.W. Fourqurean; K.L. Heck; A.R. Hughes; G.A. Kendrick; W.J. Kenworthy; S. Olyarnik; F.T. Short (2006). "A global crisis for seagrass ecosystems". BioScience. 56 (12): 987–996. doi:10.1641/0006-3568(2006)56[987:AGCFSE]2.0.CO;2. hdl:10261/88476. S2CID 4936412.
- J.J. Cole; Y.T. Prairie; N.F. Caraco; W.H. McDowell; L.J. Tranvik; R.G. Striegl; C.M. Duarte; P. Kortelainen; J.A. Downing; J.J. Middelburg; J. Melack (2007). "Plumbing the global carbon cycle: integrating inland waters into the terrestrial carbon budget". Ecosystems. 10 (1): 172–185. Bibcode:2007Ecosy..10..172C. doi:10.1007/s10021-006-9013-8. S2CID 1728636.
- M. Waycott; C.M. Duarte; T.J. Carruthers; R.J. Orth; W.C. Dennison; S. Olyarnik; A. Calladine; J.W. Fourqurean; K.L. Heck; A.R. Hughes; G.A. Kendrick (2009). "Accelerating loss of seagrasses across the globe threatens coastal ecosystems". Proceedings of the National Academy of Sciences. 106 (30): 12377–12381. Bibcode:2009PNAS..10612377W. doi:10.1073/pnas.0905620106. PMC 2707273. PMID 19587236.
- E. Mcleod; G.L. Chmura; S. Bouillon; R. Salm; M. Björk; C.M. Duarte; C.E. Lovelock; W.H. Schlesinger; B.R. Silliman (2011). "A blueprint for blue carbon: toward an improved understanding of the role of vegetated coastal habitats in sequestering CO2" (PDF). Frontiers in Ecology and the Environment. 9 (10): 552–560. Bibcode:2011FrEE....9..552M. doi:10.1890/110004. Archived from the original (PDF) on 2016-12-20.
- K.J. Kroeker; R.L. Kordas; R. Crim; I.E. Hendriks; L. Ramajo; G.S. Singh; C.M. Duarte; J.P. Gattuso (2013). "Impacts of ocean acidification on marine organisms: quantifying sensitivities and interaction with warming". Global Change Biology. 19 (6): 1884–1896. Bibcode:2013GCBio..19.1884K. doi:10.1111/gcb.12179. PMC 3664023. PMID 23505245.
