= Stephen R. Carpenter =

American lake ecologist

Stephen Russell Carpenter
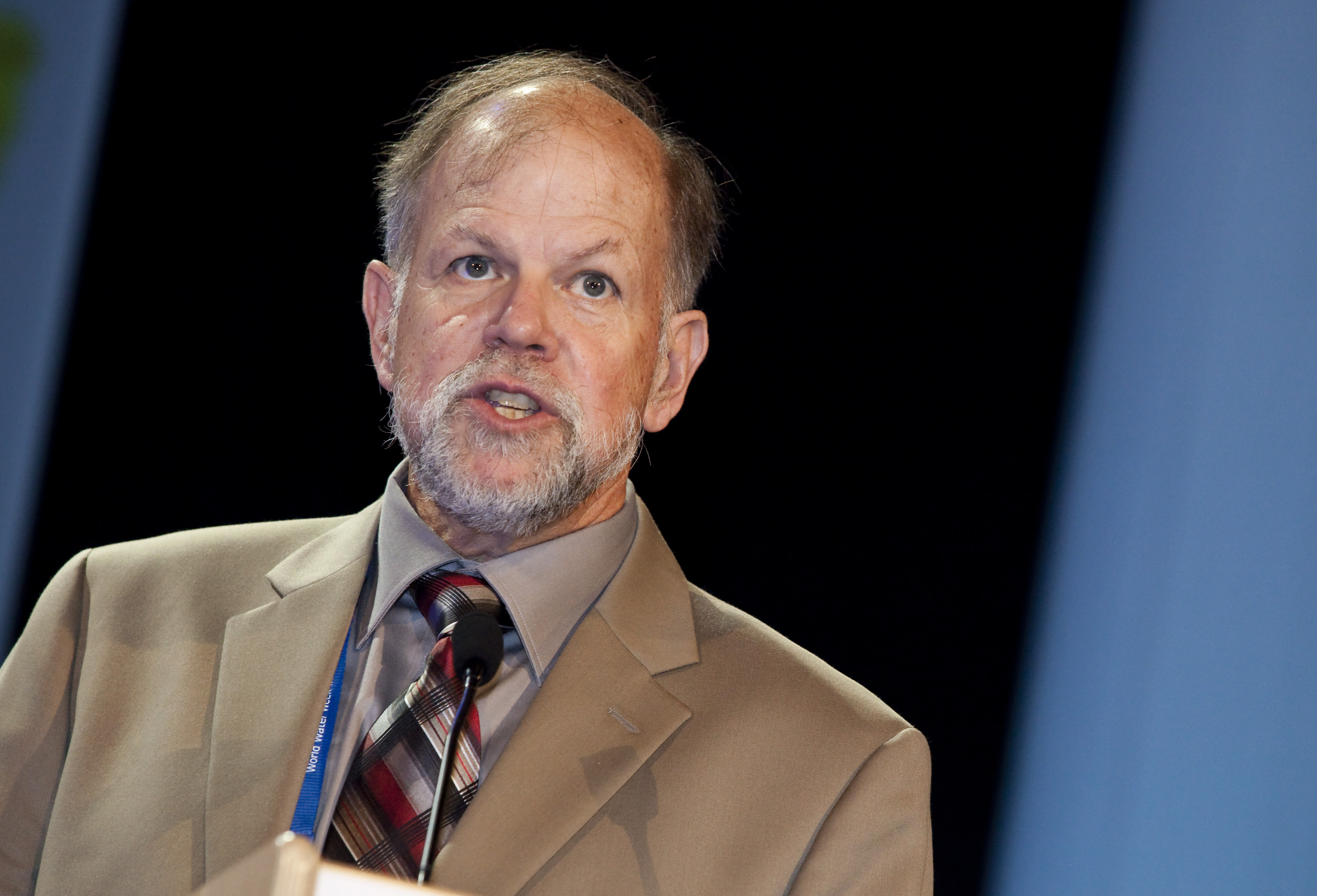
- Education: University of Wisconsin, Madison
- Scientific career
- Thesis: Some environmental impacts of mechanical harvesting of nuisance submersed vascular plants (1979)

Stephen Russell Carpenter (born July 5, 1952) is an American lake ecologist who focuses on lake eutrophication which is the over-enrichment of lake ecosystems leading to toxic blooms of micro-organisms and fish kills.

== Early life ==
Born in Kansas City, Missouri, United States, his father, Richard, a chemist, became the Director of the National Academies’ Board on Environmental Studies and Toxicology, so Carpenter was immersed in science at a young age. In his youth, Carpenter spent his summers on his grandfather's farm in Missouri. During this time he and his relatives enjoyed fishing, hunting and camping. “Hiking, camping, fishing, and hunting all come together in ecology,” he says. “I was really excited when I discovered there was a way to get paid for being a scientist outdoors.”

== Education ==
His interest in ecology was sparked during his undergraduate program at Amherst College. After his sophomore year, Carpenter worked for the summer on a survey of tree cover in Glacier National Park. Carpenter performed undergraduate research in the Fort River of Massachusetts on the primary production of macrophytes under the instruction of Stuart Fisher, an aquatic ecosystem scientist. He received a B.A. in biology in 1974 and then entered the graduate programs in Botany and Oceanography and Limnology at the University of Wisconsin-Madison where he participated in the lab of Michael Adams to examine the role played by macrophytes in the phosphorus cycle of lake ecosystems. During his graduate years he met his wife, Susan Moths, whom he married in the same year he finished his doctoral dissertation, 1979.

== Career ==
He began a teaching career at the University of Notre Dame where he continued to work on lake research at the university's field station near Land O’ Lakes Wisconsin. Here he created a more broadly scoped study of lake ecosystems to include plants and animals and the food web. In 1982 he and Jim Kitchell began work on the trophic cascades Project, which involved the dynamics of the lake ecosystems. After 10 years spent at Notre Dame, he returned to the University of Wisconsin-Madison to a faculty position in the Center for Limnology and Department of Zoology. Madison had a strong limnology program allowing him to pursue other research including the accumulation of polychlorinated biphenyls in fish and invertebrates in Lake Michigan. He resumed work on the Madison lakes, including Lake Mendota, where his interest in the phosphorus cycle and eutrophication was renewed. His studies on the phosphorus cycle focused on nonpoint phosphorus pollution and how elevated phosphorus concentrations impacted the ecosystem of Lake Mendota. These investigations led Carpenter to devise strategies to manage the phosphorus cycle. By the mid-1990s he began to study the economics of eutrophication, in which he compared the benefits factories and farms receive by causing eutrophication to the benefits of keeping a lake clean and clear with the goal of maximizing the benefits on both sides. From 1999 to 2009 Carpenter led the North Temperate Lakes Long Term Ecological Research at UW-Madison. In 2009 he became director of the UW-Madison Center for Limnology. In 2017 he retired as director in order to pursue research interests.

Carpenter was on the Science Committee for the Programme on Ecosystem Change and Society and the board for the Stockholm Resilience Centre. As of 2021, he is the co-editor in chief of the journal Ecosystems. In 2000-2005 he was co-chair of the Scenarios Working Group of the Millennium Ecosystem Assessment. He led the North Temperate Lakes research site of the Long Term Ecological Research Network program at the University of Wisconsin in 1999-2009. He is a former president of the Ecological Society of America. As of 2011, Carpenter has published 5 books and about 450 scientific papers, book chapters, reviewed reports and commentaries.

== Awards ==
Carpenter is the 2011 laureate of the Stockholm Water Prize for his research on how lake ecosystems are affected by their surrounding landscape and by human activities such as nutrient loading, fishing, and introductions of exotic species. His other awards include a Pew Fellowship in Conservation and Environment, the Naumann-Thienemann medal of the International Society of Limnology in 2007 for "research that has built bridges between ecological theory, ecosystem experiments, and management of complex limnological problems" and the work that "has elucidated the importance of the trophic cascade and regime shifts in the management of lakes", the G. Evelyn Hutchinson Award in 1999 from the Association for the Sciences of Limnology and Oceanography, the Robert H. MacArthur Award in 2000 and Fellow in 2012 from the Ecological Society of America, the Excellence in Ecology Prize (ECI Prize) in 2000 from the Ecology Institute for limnetic ecology, and the Ramon Margalef Prize in Ecology in 2018 from the Generalitat de Catalunya. In 2001, Carpenter was also awarded membership in the US National Academy of Sciences and Foreign Membership of the Royal Swedish Academy of Sciences and 2006 he was elected to the American Academy of Arts and Sciences. In 2022 he was also awarded the Blue Planet Prize.

== Research ==
Carpenter's research interest is in whole-ecosystem experiments and adaptive ecosystem management in freshwaters. Specific topics include: trophic cascades and their effects on production and nutrient cycling; contaminant cycles; freshwater fisheries; eutrophication; nonpoint pollution; ecological economics of freshwater; resilience of social-ecological systems; and early warnings of collapse in complex systems. "Eutrophication is a significant environmental problem that can impact humans on a recreational, economic, and even public health level,” says Carpenter, “and it's likely to intensify in the coming decades due to increases in human population, demand for more food, land conversion, and fertilizer use."

== Select publications ==
- Carpenter, Stephen R.; Kitchell, James F.; Hodgson, James R. (November 1985). "Cascading Trophic Interactions and Lake Productivity". BioScience. 35 (10): 634–639. doi:10.2307/1309989. JSTOR 1309989.
- Carpenter, S. R.; Kitchell, J. F.; Hodgson, J. R.; Cochran, P. A.; Elser, J. J.; Elser, M. M.; Lodge, D. M.; Kretchmer, D.; He, X.; von Ende, C. N. (December 1987). "Regulation of Lake Primary Productivity by Food Web Structure". Ecology. 68 (6): 1863–1876. doi:10.2307/1939878. JSTOR 1939878. PMID 29357166.
- Carpenter, S. R.; Caraco, N. F.; Correll, D. L.; Howarth, R. W.; Sharpley, A. N.; Smith, V. H. (August 1998). "Nonpoint Pollution of Surface Waters with Phosphorus and Nitrogen". Ecological Applications. 8 (3): 559–568. doi:10.1890/1051-0761(1998)008[0559:NPOSWW]2.0.CO;2. hdl:1808/16724.
- Carpenter, S. R.; Ludwig, D.; Brock, W. A. (August 1999). "Management of Eutrophication for Lakes Subject to Potentially Irreversible Change". Ecological Applications. 9 (3): 751. doi:10.2307/2641327. JSTOR 2641327.
- Scheffer, Marten; Carpenter, Steve; Foley, Jonathan A.; Folke, Carl; Walker, Brian (11 October 2001). "Catastrophic shifts in ecosystems". Nature. 413 (6856): 591–596. Bibcode:2001Natur.413..591S. doi:10.1038/35098000. PMID 11595939. S2CID 8001853.
- Pace, Michael L.; Cole, Jonathan J.; Carpenter, Stephen R.; Kitchell, James F.; Hodgson, James R.; Van de Bogert, Matthew C.; Bade, Darren L.; Kritzberg, Emma S.; Bastviken, David (15 January 2004). "Whole-lake carbon-13 additions reveal terrestrial support of aquatic food webs". Nature. 427 (6971): 240–243. Bibcode:2004Natur.427..240P. doi:10.1038/nature02227. PMID 14724637. S2CID 1900532.
- Carpenter, S. R.; Cole, J. J.; Pace, M. L.; Batt, R.; Brock, W. A.; Cline, T.; Coloso, J.; Hodgson, J. R.; Kitchell, J. F.; Seekell, D. A.; Smith, L.; Weidel, B. (28 April 2011). "Early Warnings of Regime Shifts: A Whole-Ecosystem Experiment". Science. 332 (6033): 1079–1082. Bibcode:2011Sci...332.1079C. CiteSeerX 10.1.1.366.1634. doi:10.1126/science.1203672. PMID 21527677. S2CID 42342453.
