= Caroline M. Solomon =

American biologist and deaf educator

- Born: Caroline Miller
- Other names: Caroline Miller Solomon, Caroline Solomon
- Occupation: academic
- Years active: 2000-present
- Known for: creating a database for American Sign Language signs for scientific terms

Caroline M. Solomon is an American academic and president of the National Technical Institute for the Deaf whose teaching focuses on bringing deaf and hard-of-hearing students into the fields of science, technology, engineering, and mathematics. Having experienced first-hand the problems for deaf students in classrooms without sign language interpreters, Solomon, who taught biology at Gallaudet University, has designed databases to help students and teachers network with organizations and interpreters familiar with educational bridges for deaf and hard-of-hearing students. She is a co-creator of a database that formalizes the lexicon of signs used for scientific and technological terms in American Sign Language. Her innovations to teaching techniques were recognized with the Ramón Margalef Award for Excellence in Education of the Association for the Sciences of Limnology and Oceanography in 2017. Solomon is the first woman named as president of the National Technical Institute for the Deaf since the college’s establishment in 1965.

== Early life ==
Caroline Solomon grew up in Delaware and contracted spinal meningitis as an infant, which resulted in her being deaf in a hearing family. As a teenager, she participated in the Deaflympics as a swimmer and became interested in the environment because she was unable to swim in a heavily polluted creek near their home. Upon graduation from high school, she enrolled at Harvard University, studying both environmental science and public policy. When she entered Harvard, there were no sign language interpreters on the staff, but the university hired one midway through Solomon's first semester. She graduated with a Bachelor of Arts in 1996. Furthering her education, Solomon went on to earn a master's degree in biological oceanography from the University of Washington. Solomon earned her a PhD in biological oceanography from the University of Maryland in 2006.

== Career ==
After completion of her master's at the University of Washington, School of Oceanography, Solomon, who wanted to inspire other deaf and hard-of-hearing students, joined the faculty of Gallaudet University in 2000. She was promoted to full professor in 2011. Her research focuses on the ecological effects that occur when algae, bacteria, and viruses interact with nitrogen byproducts from agricultural production and other human activity. Studying waterways such as the Chesapeake Bay and the Anacostia River, she analyzes the occurrence of algal blooms and pollutants to determine prevention measures which can be implemented in conservation efforts.

Recognizing that her students are more visual than auditory, Solomon often demonstrates lessons in a visual way, such as lining up chairs to represent skin and having a student playing a pathogen try to break through. Working in tandem with the Anacostia Riverkeeper Project, the DC Water Research and Resources Institute, the Department of Energy and Environment, the Maryland Sea Grant College Program, and the National Science Foundation's Research Experiences for Undergraduates program, Solomon conducts summer research projects to help students not only learn how to research, but to understand the need to communicate their findings to create conservation policy.

In addition to her own research and teaching, Solomon has been instrumental in hosting national workshops to increase participation of deaf and hard-of-hearing students in STEM fields. In 2012, she led a workshop for the National Science Foundation to discuss ways to create mentoring opportunities for deaf scientists throughout their career trajectory. Out of this workshop was born a program to create a database to be used as a reference network, including organizations which support scientists with hearing loss and interpreters who have knowledge of scientific terminology. Working with colleagues from the University of Washington, Solomon developed a database of the technical signs used in American Sign Language for scientific terminology in an effort to standardize the lexicon.

On July 8, 2025, Solomon was named National Technical Institute for the Deaf president, succeeding Gerard Buckley.

== Awards and honors ==
Solomon was recognized with the 2013 Distinguished Faculty Award from Gallaudet and in 2017 by the Association for the Sciences of Limnology and Oceanography's Ramón Margalef Award for Excellence in Education for her innovations to teaching.

In 2020, she was inducted into the Deaflympics Hall of Fame for her swimming achievements.

During her four years on Harvard's varsity swim team, Caroline distinguished herself as a standout competitor. She continues to rank among the top 10 swimmers at Harvard in the 100 and 200 butterfly as well as the 200 individual medley.

== Bibliography ==
- DeBenedictis, Julia E. (December 2, 2015). "Deaf Students Utilize Resources, But Still Face Barriers". Rochester Institute of Technology. Rochester, New York. Archived from the original on 16 June 2025.
- Goad, Angela (May 19, 2016). "Caroline M. Solomon". Introductions Necessary. Washington, D. C.: Nine Hour Films. Archived from the original on 23 May 2024.
- Humlicek, Gabrielle (August 12, 2017). "Combination for the Anacostia". Washington, D.C.: Hill Rag. Archived from the original on 20 August 2017.
- Kowalski, Kathiann (August 31, 2017). "Disabilities don't stop these experts in science and tech". Washington, D.C.: Science News for Students. Archived from the original on 3 September 2017.
- Sanchez, Claudio (May 20, 2015). "Biology Professor's Calling: Teach Deaf Students They Can Do Anything". Washington, D. C.: NPR. Archived from the original on 10 May 2018.
- Solomon, Caroline M. (May 18, 2012). Workshop for Emerging Deaf and Hard of Hearing Scientists. Washington, D. C.: Gallaudet University. CiteSeerX 10.1.1.683.5868.
- "ASLO honors Caroline M. Solomon with the 2017 Ramón Margalef Award for Excellence in Education". ASLO. Waco, Texas: Association for the Sciences of Limnology and Oceanography. 2017. Archived from the original on 11 May 2018.
