= Ramón Margalef Award for Excellence in Education =

Educational award in the fields of limnology and oceanography

The Ramón Margalef Award for Excellence in Education was launched in 2008 by the Association for the Sciences of Limnology and Oceanography to recognize innovations and excellence in teaching and mentoring students in the fields of limnology and oceanography. Criteria for the award require "adherence to the highest standards of excellence" in pedagogy as well as verification that the teaching techniques have furthered the field of aquatic science. The award is not affiliated with the Ramon Margalef Prize in Ecology, often referred to as the Ramon Margalef Award, given by the Generalitat de Catalunya in Barcelona. The award has been presented annually since 2009.

== Winners ==
The winners have included:

Year	Award Recipients	
2009	Benjamin Cuker	"For his outstanding teaching in the classroom, his exemplary and nationally-noted efforts to promote minority participation in aquatic sciences, and for being a gifted mentor. We truly have an outstanding and caring educator to be our first recipient of this important award."
2010	C. Susan Weiler	"For her longstanding dedication to mentoring and educating the next generation of scholars in limnology and oceanography, and particularly for her visionary development of programs for newly graduated doctoral students"
2011	Juan González Lagoa	"A tireless and remarkable educator who, during his long professional life has enriched the educational experiences of countless students and teachers of all ages"
2012	John P. Smol	"For his outstanding work with educational duties of teaching undergraduate courses and mentoring graduate students"
2013	Warwick F. Vincent	"For his devotion to teaching, which has never faded, and for his contagious passion, which is just as intense as in the very beginning, that together make him the best mentor a student could have"
2014	Stanley I. Dodson (posthumous)	"An extraordinary educator who taught respect and awe for natural surroundings, the importance of observation, and appreciation for the process of learning"
2015	Marianne V. Moore	"Is recognized for her work as an outstanding teacher who has been a tremendous inspiration to her students in the classroom, the laboratory and the field; her scholarship has been notable for its excellence, broad recognition and impact around the world"
2016	Kenneth H. Dunton	"For being a visionary and continually creating new and innovative approaches to bridge science and education, bringing hands-on, real world outreach into local communities, and training science teachers and the next generation of marine scientists and ecologists"
2017	Caroline M. Solomon	"For her extraordinary accomplishments in bringing the deaf and hearing worlds in science together, coupled with her exceptional skill as a mentor, educator, and leader to inspire us all"
2018	Cynthia Hagley	"For her vision and success at developing career-long relationships among scientists and educators, for impacting thousands of students, and for making environmental and aquatic data understandable to non-specialists"
2019	David Fields	"For his enthusiastic leadership and effusive commitment to developing transformative, hands-on marine science education programs, and for creating opportunities for authentic science experiences for high school and college students from all backgrounds"
2020	Stephanie Hampton	"For her outstanding contributions in the training and mentoring of young scientists with an emphasis on collaboration, data sharing and networking that have engaged researchers at all levels"
2021	Russell Cuhel	"In recognition of his outstanding 27-yr leadership in training, mentoring, and providing professional development opportunities that has promoted a diverse undergraduate presence within the aquatic sciences."
2022	Michael Vanni	for his "lasting impact on his trainees’ careers and approaches to education by providing transformative educational experiences and through a passionate commitment to student mentoring"

The information in this table is from the Association for the Sciences of Limnology and Oceanography.
