= Susan Powell (weather forecaster) =

British broadcast meteorologist for the BBC

Susan Powell (born 1974 or 1975) is a broadcast meteorologist for the BBC. She broadcasts on the BBC News Channel, BBC One, BBC World, BBC Radio 4, and she is a main weather reporter on the BBC Six O'Clock News and BBC Radio 5 Live. She was previously a main weather reporter on the BBC Ten O'Clock News.

== Early life and education ==
Powell grew up in the village of Wellington in Herefordshire, where she attended Aylestone High School and Hereford Sixth Form College. She studied chemistry at the University of Swansea. She stayed on to complete a doctorate in engineering with the support of the steelmaker Corus.

== Broadcasting career ==
Powell worked for Corus before joining the Met Office as a trainee broadcast meteorologist, and first broadcast in 2001. She is a poultry fancier.
