= Robert Henry Peters =

Canadian ecologist

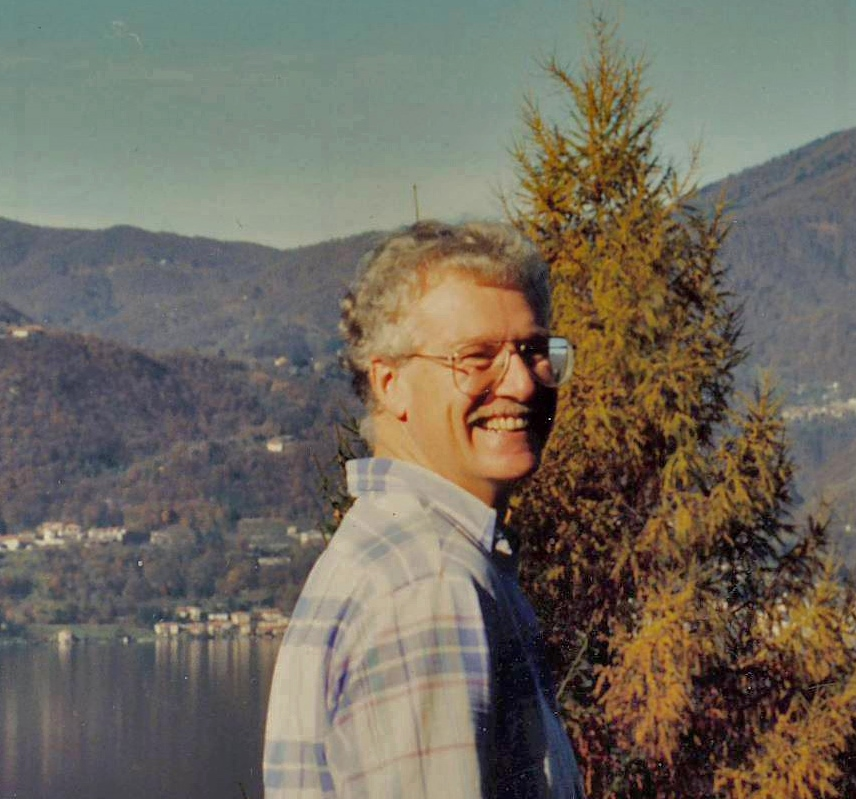
Rob Peters at Lake Orta.

Robert Henry Peters (August 2, 1946 – June 26, 1996) was a Canadian ecologist and limnologist that championed a predictive approach to science in order to make quantitative models relevant to public needs. He proposed that predictive limnology could be an effective tool for producing empirical models about relevant processes and organisms in lakes. He was a Professor in the Biology Department of McGill University, Montreal, Canada from 1974 to his death in 1996.

== Early life and education ==
Robert H Peters was born on August 2, 1946, in Toronto, Ontario, Canada where he grew up. He spent summers at a cottage in the Kawartha lakes region, where he developed his keen interest in natural history. He obtained his BSc and PhD (1972) from the University of Toronto. His thesis on nutrient regeneration by zooplankton was supervised by Frank Rigler, a mentor and friend who profoundly influenced his vision of science. Peters’ postdoctoral studies were held in Pallanza (Italy), Vienna (Austria), and Munich (Germany). In particular, the Istituto Italiano di Idrobiologia in Pallanza (now the Institute of Ecosystem Study) remained for him a special and unique place where he returned for three sabbatical leaves to profit from the stimulating presence of many colleagues, as well as access to the Istituto’s vast library. It was in Pallanza that he met his wife Antonella Cattaneo with whom he had two children, Julian and Elisa. Through his Italian family, he acquired a lasting love for Italian culture.

== Scientific career ==
Peters joined the Department of Biology of McGill University as Assistant Professor in 1974, becoming Associate Professor in 1979, then Full Professor in 1986. During his career, he published over 130 scientific papers, comments and book chapters and wrote four influential books.

Throughout his career, Peters strived to make ecology more quantitative and more directly relevant to addressing real-world environmental problems. His first major contribution was the book Ecological Implications of Body Size., a compilation of relationships between the body size of an organism and various physiological and community processes. This book is still highly cited (more than 5000 citations up to October 2016) and was influential in laying much of the groundwork for new fields of ecological research, most notably work on the metabolic theory. Accomplishments and new hypotheses generated by Peters’ book were recently discussed in a symposium titled “Size-based approaches to aquatic ecosystems and fisheries science: a symposium in honour of Rob Peters” (American Fisheries Society Meeting, Quebec City, August 2015) and published in an issue of the Canadian Journal of Fisheries Aquatic Sciences

Peters presented his ideas on the shortcomings of ecology in several papers, which were extended and summarized in his book A Critique for Ecology. In this book, Peters contends that, since science is a tool for obtaining information about nature through predictions, a substantial part of ecology cannot be considered to be science because it provides no concrete predictive models. Peters argues specifically that a return to observing patterns and asking simple solvable questions of general relevance to science and society could make ecology a useful, practical, and informative science, which is desperately needed to meet the problems of our age. This book was very controversial, and received both sharp criticism and high praise and still generates lively debates on the effectiveness of current approaches to ecology. A day-long session (Predictive limnology revisited: Rob Peters’ legacy after 20 years) was dedicated to this discussion at the XXXIII International Society of Limnology Congress held in Torino, Italy from July 31 to August 5, 2016.

Peters published reflections on how limnologists/ecologists conduct research and teach science in his last book Science and Limnology co-authored by his mentor, the late Frank Rigler. In the same year, he and Lars Håkanson collaborated on the book Predictive limnology, a compilation of empirical models developed for inland waters.

== Awards ==
In 1991 Robert Peters was awarded the International Ecology Institute prize in Limnetic Ecology, in recognition of his scientific contributions to aquatic ecology. He also received the Frank Rigler Award from the Society of Canadian Limnologists in 1992. The Association for the Sciences of Limnology and Oceanography (ASLO) posthumously granted him the ASLO Citation for Scientific Excellence in 1997. In 2006 the Society of Canadian Limnologists instituted the Rob Peters Award, presented annually to recognize the best aquatic sciences paper published the preceding year by a Canadian student.
