= Ramon Margalef Prize in Ecology =

Spanish environmental award

The Ramon Margalef Prize in Ecology (Catalan: Premi Ramon Margalef d'Ecologia) is a prize awarded annually by the Generalitat de Catalunya to recognize an exceptional scientific career or discovery in the field of ecology or other environmental sciences. The award was created to honor the life and work of Ramon Margalef. The award has been presented every year since 2004 and comes with an honorarium of €80,000 and a sculpture representing a microalga, called Picarola margalefii. It is open to ecologists from anywhere in the world.

== Awardees ==
- 2005 — Paul K. Dayton (United States)
- 2006 — John Lawton (United Kingdom)
- 2007 — Harold A. Mooney (United States)
- 2008 — Daniel Pauly (France)
- 2009 — Paul R. Ehrlich (United States)
- 2010 — Simon A. Levin (United States)
- 2011 — Juan Carlos Castilla (Chile)
- 2012 — Daniel Simberloff (United States)
- 2013 — Sallie W. Chisholm (United States)
- 2014 — David Tilman (United States)
- 2015 — Robert E. Ricklefs (United States)
- 2016 — Josep Peñuelas
- 2017 — Sandra Díaz (Argentina)
- 2018 — Stephen R. Carpenter (United States)
- 2019 — Carlos M. Duarte (Spain)
- 2020 — Sandra Lavorel (France)
- 2021 — Jordi Bascompte
- 2022 - Gretchen C. Daily
- 2023 - Marten Scheffer
- 2024 - Carlos M. Herrera
- 2025 Yadvinder Malhi

== Published lectures ==
- Levin, Simon A. (31 August 2011). "Evolution the ecosystem level: On the evolution of ecosystem patterns". Contributions to Science. 7 (1): 11–16. doi:10.2436/20.7010.01.102. ISSN 2013-410X.
- Castilla, Juan Carlos (2012). "Conservation and social-ecological systems in the 21st century of the Anthropocene era". Contributions to Science (8): 11–21. doi:10.2436/20.7010.01.129. ISSN 2013-410X.
- Simberloff, Daniel (2013). "Biological invasions: Much progress plus several contorversies". Contributions to Science (9): 7–16. doi:10.2436/20.7010.01.158. ISSN 2013-410X.
- Chisholm, Sallie W. (2014). "Margalef's mandala, Prochlorococcus, and geoengineering". Contributions to Science (10): 7–15. doi:10.2436/20.7010.01.183. ISSN 2013-410X.
- Tilman, David (2016). "Biodiversity: From evolutionary origins to ecosystem functioning". Contributions to Science (11): 11–20. doi:10.2436/20.7010.01.209. ISSN 2013-410X.
- Ricklefs, Robert E. (2016). "Intrinsic and extrinsic influences on ecological communities". Contributions to Science. 12 (12): 27–34. doi:10.2436/20.7010.01.241. ISSN 2013-410X.

== See also ==
- List of ecology awards
