= Journal of Limnology =

- Discipline: Limnology
- Language: English
- Edited by: Roberto Bertoni, Diego Fontaneto

Publication details
- Former name(s): Memorie dell'Istituto Italiano di Idrobiologia
- History: 1942–present
- Publisher: PAGEPress (Italy)
- Frequency: Triannually
- Open access: Yes
- Impact factor: 1.267 (2019)

Standard abbreviations
- ISO 4: J. Limnol.

Indexing
- ISSN: 1129-5767 (print); 1723-8633 (web)
- LCCN: sn99015413
- OCLC no.: 818976499

Links
- Journal homepage; Online access; Online archive

The Journal of Limnology is a triannual peer-reviewed open access scientific journal covering all aspects of limnology, including the ecology, biology, microbiology, geology, physics, and chemistry of freshwater habitats, as well as the impact of human activities and the management and conservation of inland aquatic ecosystems. It was established in 1942 as the Memorie dell'Istituto Italiano di Idrobiologia by the Water Research Institute (Verbania) of which it is still the official journal, obtaining its current title in 1999.

== Abstracting and indexing ==
The journal is abstracted and indexed by Aquatic Sciences and Fisheries Abstracts, BIOSIS Previews, EBSCO databases, GEOBASE, Science Citation Index Expanded, and Scopus.

== Notable articles ==
The three most highly cited papers published in the journal are:

- Jeppesen, E., Meerhoff, M., Davidson, T. A., Trolle, D., SondergaarD, M., Lauridsen, T. L., ... & Nielsen, A. "Climate change impacts on lakes: an integrated ecological perspective based on a multi-faceted approach, with special focus on shallow lakes". Journal of Limnology. 73: 88–111. 2014. doi:10.4081/jlimnol.2014.844. hdl:10854/2778.
- Michalczyk, Ł., & Kaczmarek, Ł. "The Tardigrada Register: a comprehensive online data repository for tardigrade taxonomy". Journal of Limnology. 72: 175–181. 2014. doi:10.4081/jlimnol.2013.s1.e22.
- Hall, R. "The palaeogeography of Sundaland and Wallacea since the Late Jurassic". Journal of Limnology. 72: 1–7. 2014. doi:10.4081/jlimnol.2013.s2.e1.
