= Bolshiye Koty =

Human settlement in Irkutsky District, Russia

Coordinates: 51°54′19″N 105°4′31″E

Bolshiye Koty (Russian: Больши́е Ко́ты) is a rural locality (a settlement) in Irkutsk Oblast, Russia situated on the western shore of Lake Baikal, 18 kilometers (11 mi) to the northeast of Listvyanka. The history of the settlement is closely tied to the beginning of gold mining near Baikal in 1842.

There are several versions of the origin of the name Bolshiye Koty. According to the dictionary by Vladimir Dal, "koty" means a trap for fish installed at the mouth of a river. Alternatively, the name of the settlement comes from the word "Kotky", or "Koty", a word used to call wooden shoes worn by "katorzhnik" - a forced laborer in katorga camps.

The settlement belongs to Pribaikalsky National Park. The Bolshiye Koty River runs near the settlement and into Lake Baikal. The settlement is accessible during the summer by ferry from Irkutsk or Listvyanka and in the winter via roads across the ice on the lake. It is also the home of Biostation #1, the first of ten research centers around the lake. This Biostation operates in coordination with Irkutsk State University, and in the summer hosts study programs for biology and meteorology students from the university.

== Views of Bolshiye Koty ==
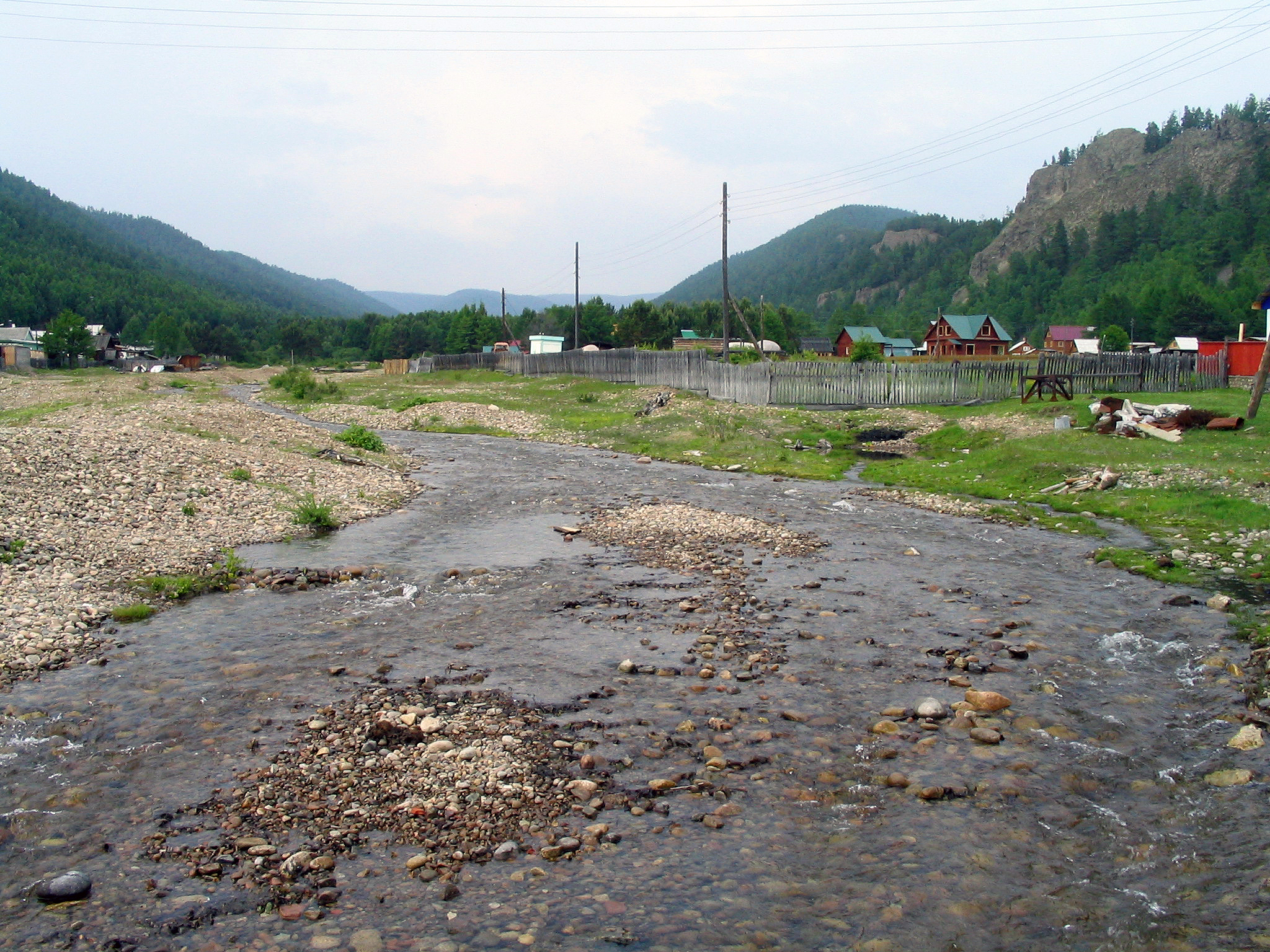
Stream running through the valley at Bolshiye Koty

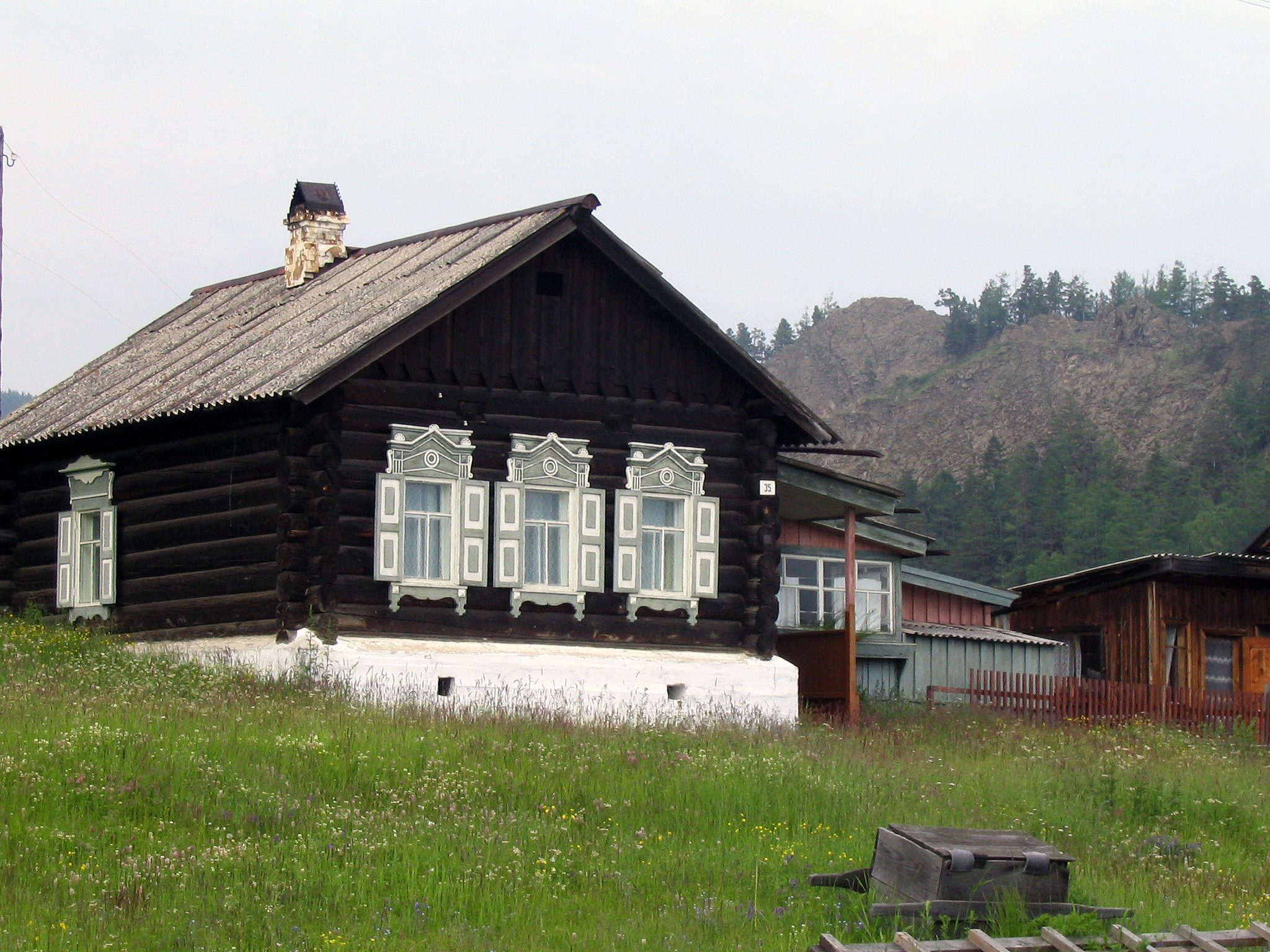
A wooden house in Bolshiye Koty, representative of typical style with ornate windows

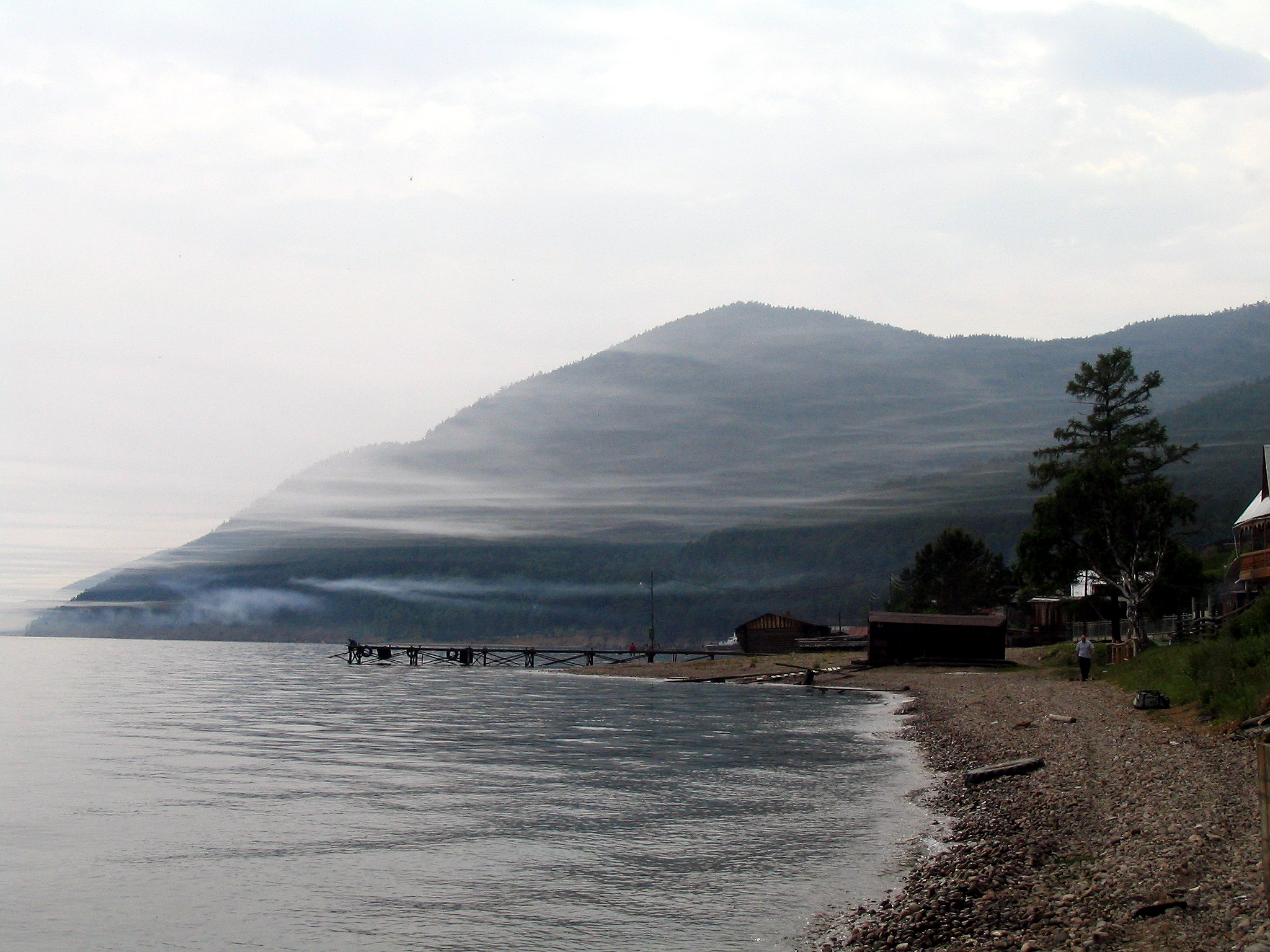
Image of Lake Baikal as seen from Bolshiye Koty

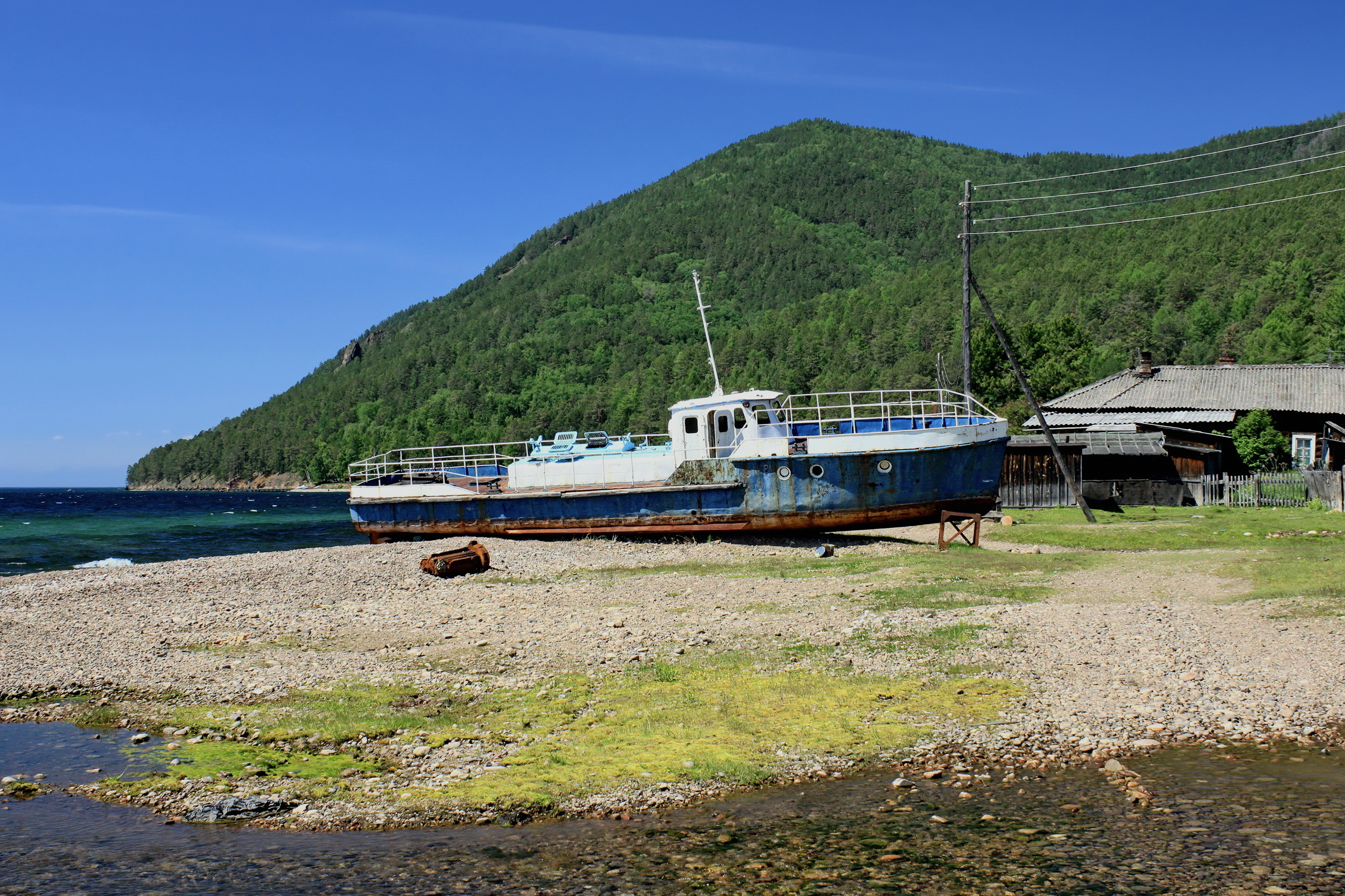
Ship on the shore of Lake Baikal in Bolshiye Koty
