= Robert Peters (bigamist) =

English conman, plagiarist, and bigamist (1918–2005)

Robert Peters (born Robert Michael Parkins; 1918–2005) was a British de-frocked minister, a plagiarist, a conman, and a bigamist who married at least eight women. He was dubbed "the Romeo Rev" by the popular press. In 2019 he was the subject of a biography by Adam Sisman titled The Professor and the Parson: A Story of Desire, Deceit and Defrocking (Profile Books).

== Background ==
Peters was born Robert Michael Parkins on 11 August 1918 in Carlisle. He attended a local grammar school and later attended St Aidan's Theological College in Birkenhead. Peters was ordained as a deacon by the Bishop of Wakefield in 1941, and he became the assistant curate at the Priory of All Hallows in 1943. He later worked as a clergyman for several years, until his licence was withdrawn. Despite losing his licence, he continued to hold services in various churches, including St Paul's Cathedral.

He began teaching but was fired after he made advances on the daughter of a colleague. At another school he eloped with deputy headmaster’s wife. In 1947 Peters was awaiting trial for a charge of bigamy. However, he fled to the Alps, hiding in a hotel at Lake Geneva. A reporter found him and attempted to convince him to return to England, but Peters refused, and was later arrested in the hotel. Paris officials arranged for Peters to be deported, but he escaped from the train and fled to Sri Lanka where he briefly held the role of Principal of the Anglican Divinity school.

Peters was later fired after it was discovered that he had forged his references. Officials arranged for him to be repatriated, but Peters fled again, this time to Singapore and later to Australia.

Peter later served four months in prison for bigamy. He had also previously been sentenced for passing a false check and stealing a car.
