= Richard Vollenweider =

Swiss limnologist (1922–2007)

Richard Albert Vollenweider (June 22, 1922 in Zürich, Switzerland – January 20, 2007 in Burlington, Ontario, Canada) was a notable limnologist.

Richard Vollenweider wrote several widely cited academic works about lake eutrophication management. His pioneering work included a technical report from 1968, which related inputs of total phosphorus to chlorophyll a concentrations (a common proxy measure of algal bloom intensity).

His findings thereby laid the ground for predicting expected environmental effects on the Secchi depth and algal bloom intensity from phosphorus abatement, e.g., in sewage treatment plants.

He also played an important role in restoring several eutrophicated lakes, such as the Great Lakes of North America.

Richard Vollenweider was awarded the Tyler Environmental Prize (1986), the Naumann-Thiennemann Medal by SIL (1987), the Global 500 Roll of Honor by UNEP (1988), and the Premio Internationale Cervia for his advice on eutrophication in the Adriatic Sea (Italy). On June 2, 1989, Vollenweider received an honorary doctorate from the Faculty of Mathematics and Science at Uppsala University, Sweden
