= Harold A. Mooney =

American ecologist

Harold A. "Hal" Mooney (born June 1, 1932 in Santa Rosa, California) is an American ecologist and professor in the Department of Biology at Stanford University. He earned his Ph.D. at Duke University in 1960 and was employed by University of California-Los Angeles the same year. He joined the staff at Stanford University in 1968. He is an expert on plants and the functioning of ecosystems from the Tropics to the Arctic. He is a highly cited scientist.

Hal Mooney has served as chairman of the United States National Research Council Committee on ecosystem management for Sustainable Marine Fisheries. He has been a coordinator of the United Nations Global Biodiversity Assessment (1995). He has been president of the Ecological Society of America and he is a member of the National Academy of Sciences, the American Philosophical Society, and a fellow of the American Academy of Arts and Sciences. He is also elected foreign member of the Russian Academy of Sciences and honorary member of the British Ecological Society.

He was the 1990 recipient of the ECI Prize in terrestrial ecology. He has received the Max Planck Research Award in biosciences (1992; together with Ernst-Detlef Schulze) and been given the Eminent Ecologist Award for 1996 by Ecological Society of America. In 2007, he received the Ramon Margalef Prize in Ecology and in 2008 was awarded the Tyler Prize, considered the Nobel Prize for Environmental Achievement.
