= International Ecology Institute =

The International Ecology Institute (ECI) is a non-profit organization of research ecologists dedicated to promoting ecological knowledge and awareness. It was established in 1984, in the village of Oldendorf/Luhe, Germany by Inter-Research, a scientific publishing organisation founded in 1979 by Professor Otto Kinne.

The aims of the institute are to facilitate the exchange of information between marine, terrestrial and freshwater ecologists, to promote environmental research, to focus the attention of scientists, politicians and the general public on important ecological issues and to find the right balance between the improvement of human society and the protection of nature.

To help achieve these aims the institute awards two annual international prizes, the ECI Prize and the IRPE Prize, and produces the book series 'Excellence in Ecology'. The ECI Prize is awarded to an ecologist for outstanding and sustained scientific achievement. The IRPE (International Recognition of Professional Excellence) prize is awarded to a young ecologist who has published independent and original or challenging research representing an important scientific breakthrough. Winners of the former prize are expected to author a new book in the 'Excellence in Ecology' series.

The institute is closely associated with the Otto Kinne Foundation, which supports young scientists by the granting of fellowships.
