= Ramon Margalef =

Spanish biologist (1919–2004)

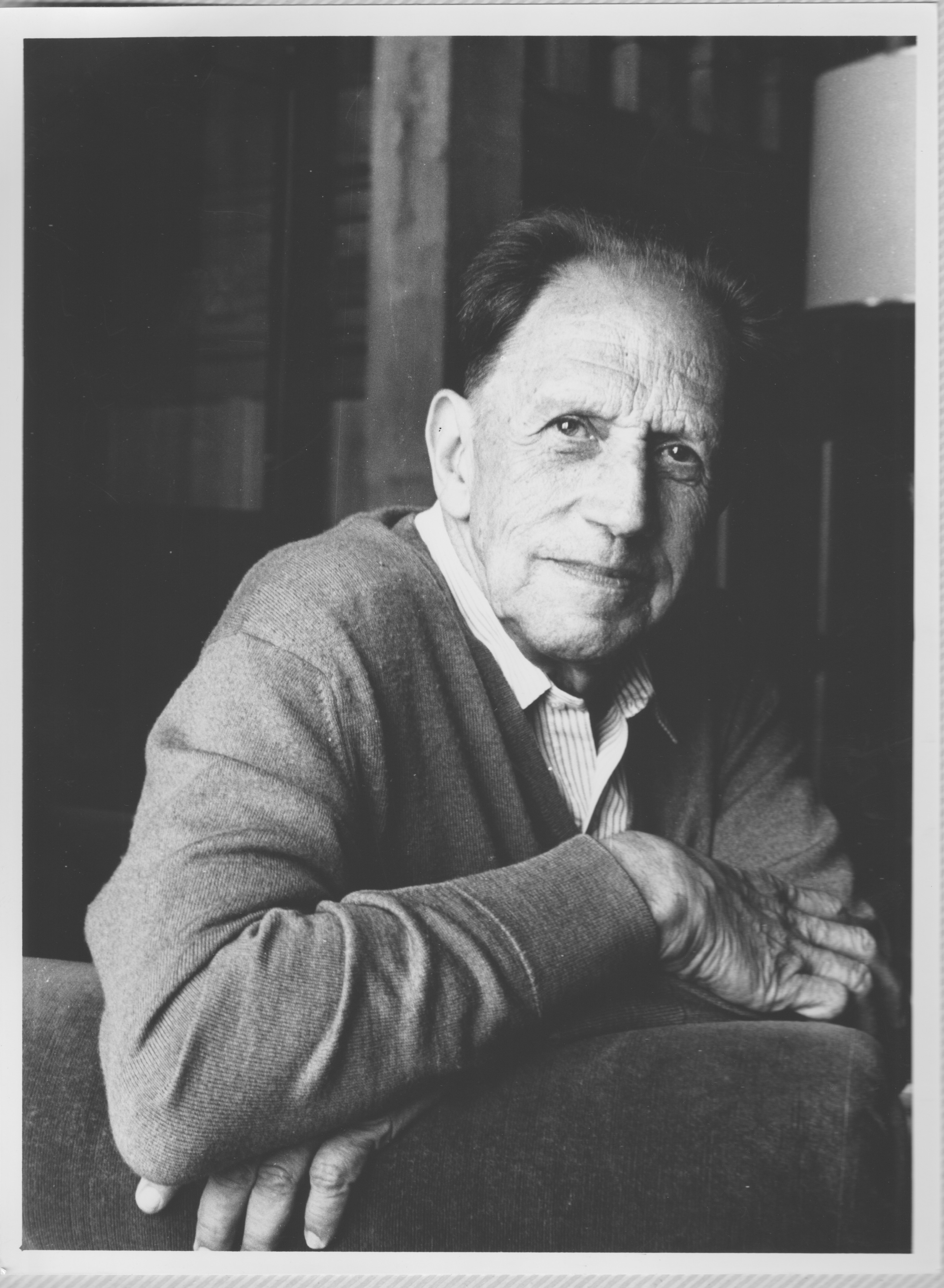
- Ramon Margalef
- Born: 16 May 1919; Barcelona, Catalonia, Spain
- Died: 23 May 2004 (aged 85); Barcelona
- Scientific career
- Workplaces: University of Barcelona
- Author abbrev. (botany): Margalef

Ramon Margalef López (Barcelona 16 May 1919 - 23 May 2004) was a Catalan biologist and ecologist. He was Emeritus Professor of Ecology at the Faculty of Biology of the University of Barcelona. Margalef, one of the most prominent scientists that Spain has produced, worked at the Institute of Applied Biology (1946–1951), and at the Fisheries Research Institute, which he directed during 1966–1967. He created the Department of Ecology of the University of Barcelona, from where he trained a huge number of ecologists, limnologists and oceanographers. In 1967 he became Spain's first professor of ecology.

== Career summary ==
From 1954 to 1974 Margalef contributed to the New York-based magazine Iberica. In 1957, with the translation into English of his inaugural lecture as a member of the Barcelona Royal Academy of Arts and Sciences, "Information Theory in Ecology", he gained a worldwide audience. Another groundbreaking article, "On certain unifying principles in ecology", published in American Naturalist in 1963, and his book "Perspectives in Ecological Theory" (1968), based on his guest lectures at the University of Chicago, consolidated him as one of the leading thinkers of modern ecology. In the summer of 1958 he was professor of Marine ecology at the Institute of Marine Biology (currently Department of Marine Sciences) of the University of Puerto Rico at Mayagüez and produced the work Comunidades Naturales ("Natural Communities").

Some of his most important work includes the application of information theory to ecological studies and the creation of mathematical models for the study of populations. Among his books, the most influential are: Natural Communities (1962), Perspectives In Ecological Theory (1968), Ecology (1974), The Biosphere (1980), Limnology (1983) and Theory of Ecological Systems (1991). He received many scientific awards, including the inaugural medal of the A.G. Huntsman Award for Excellence in the Marine Sciences, the Naumann-Thienemann Medal from the International Society of Limnology (SIL), the Ramón y Cajal Award of the Spanish Government, and the Gold Medal of the Generalitat of Catalonia (Catalan Government). In 2004, the Government of Catalonia established the Ramon Margalef Prize in Ecology, whereas the Association for the Sciences of Limnology and Oceanography established the Ramón Margalef Award for Excellence in Education in 2008.

== Selected publications ==
- Full list of publications by Professor Margalef

=== Papers ===
- Margalef, Ramon (1960). "Ideas for a synthetic approach to the ecology of running waters". Internationale Revue der Gesamten Hydrobiologie und Hydrographie. 45 (45): 133–153. doi:10.1002/iroh.19600450108.
- —— (1963). "On certain unifying principles in ecology". The American Naturalist. 97 (897): 357–374. doi:10.1086/282286. hdl:10261/165895. S2CID 85866107.
- —— (1978). "Life-forms of phytoplankton as survival alternatives in an unstable environment". Oceanol. Acta (1): 493–509.
- —— (1961). "Communication of Structure in Planktonic Populations". Limnology and Oceanography. 6 (2): 124–128. Bibcode:1961LimOc...6..124M. doi:10.4319/lo.1961.6.2.0124. hdl:10261/165801.
- —— (1979). "The Organization of Space". Oikos. 33 (2): 152–159. doi:10.2307/3543992. JSTOR 3543992.
- —— (1964). "Correspondence between the classic types of lakes and the structural and dynamic properties of their populations". SIL Proceedings, 1922-2010. 15 (1): 169–175. doi:10.1080/03680770.1962.11895518.

=== Books ===
- —— (1962). Comunidades naturales. Mayagüez: Instituto de Biología Marina de la Universidad de Puerto Rico.
- —— (1968). Perspectives in ecological theory. University of Chicago Press.
- —— (1974). Ecología. Barcelona: Omega.
- ——; Planas M.D., Armengol J., Vidal A., Prat N., Guisset A., Toja J., Estrada M. (1976). Limnología de los embalses españoles. Madrid: Dirección General de Obras Hidraúlicas.
- —— (1980). La biosfera: entre la termodinámica y el juego. Barcelona: Omega.
- (1982). Mi respuesta, collection of his articles published in Ibérica
- —— (1983). Limnología. Barcelona: Omega.
- —— (1992). Planeta azul, planeta verde. Barcelona: Prensa Científica SA.
- —— (1994). Limnology now: a paradigm of planetary problems. Amsterdam: Elsevier.
- —— (1997). Our biosphere. Oldendorf: Ecology Institute.

== See also ==
- Ramon Margalef Prize in Ecology
