= CSDMS =

The acronym CSDMS can refer to:

- The Community Surface Dynamics Modeling System, a NSF-funded project to numerically model Earth-surface processes
- The Centre for Science, Development and Media Studies, a non-governmental organization in India
- The Canadian Society of Diagnostic Medical Sonographers
