= A.G. Huntsman Award for Excellence in the Marine Sciences =

Medal awarded by the Royal Society of Canada

The A.G. Huntsman Award for Excellence in the Marine Sciences was established in 1980 by the Canadian marine science community to recognize excellence of research and outstanding contributions to marine sciences. It is presented by the Royal Society of Canada. The award honours marine scientists of any nationality who have had and continue to have a significant influence on the course of marine scientific thought. It is named in honour of Archibald Gowanlock Huntsman (1883–1973), a pioneer Canadian oceanographer and fishery biologist.

== A.G. Huntsman Medal ==
The award consists of a specially designed fine silver medal showing the CSS Hudson.

== A.G. Huntsman Foundation ==
The A.G. Huntsman Award is administered by the A.G. Huntsman Foundation, based at the Bedford Institute of Oceanography, Nova Scotia. The foundation is organized as an independent, charitable, tax-free foundation. Business of the foundation is conducted by a board of directors and executive officers. The Lieutenant Governor of Nova Scotia serves as Honorary Patron of the Huntsman Foundation. The award is presented annually by the Royal Society of Canada. The annual process of selection is conducted by a separate selection committee of Canadian marine scientists. The award ceremony takes place in the late fall at the Bedford Institute of Oceanography.

The award was created in 1980 under the leadership of scientists at the Bedford Institute of Oceanography. The award is now recognized as a major international prize. It is funded principally by interest earned on financial contributions originally received from Fisheries and Oceans Canada, Natural Resources Canada, the Province of Nova Scotia, and the Canadian Association of Petroleum Producers. Additional endowment was later granted from the LiFT Family Fund through Gift Funds Canada.

== Nominations ==
The A.G. Huntsman Medal is awarded to those men and women, of any nationality, who have had and still have a significant influence on the course of marine scientific thought; for unequalled excellence in their respective fields; for the influence of their work on the course of scientific thought in their respective fields; and for their continuing and current activities at the forefront of their respective fields.

The A.G. Huntsman Award reflects the multi-faceted nature of research in the world's oceans. From 1980 to 2013, the award was presented annually in one of three categories – Marine Geoscience, Physical/Chemical Oceanography, and Biological Oceanography and Fisheries Science – except in its inaugural year when recipients were honoured in all three. To mark its 25th anniversary in 2005, the award was again presented in all three of the above categories, as well as in the category of Interdisciplinary Marine Science. Since 2014, the category distinctions have been dropped in recognition that many facets of marine science are multi-disciplinary or interdisciplinary in character.

== Awardees ==
- Source: A.G. Huntsman Award
- 2025 Karen Wiltshire (Ireland)
- 2024 William Cheung (Canada)
- 2023 Michael J. Follows (USA)
- 2022 Uta Passow
- 2021 Shubha Sathyendranath (UK)
- 2020 John Marshall (USA)
- 2019 Adina Paytan (USA)
- 2018 Terence P. Hughes (Australia)
- 2017 Jeffrey A. Hutchings (Canada)
- 2016 Benjamin Halpern (USA)
- 2015 Philip Boyd (Ireland)
- 2014 Edward DeLong (USA)
- 2013 Scott Doney (USA)
- 2012 Katrina J. Edwards (USA)
- 2011 Andrew J. Weaver (Canada)
- 2010 Curtis A. Suttle (Canada)
- 2009 Jaia Syvitski (USA/Canada)
- 2008 Roger François (Canada)
- 2007 Thomas Kiørboe (Denmark)
- 2006 not awarded
- 2005 Robert F. Anderson (USA)
- 2005 Trevor McDougall (Australia)
- 2005 Edouard Bard (France)
- 2005 Sallie (Penny) W. Chisholm (USA)
- 2004 not awarded
- 2003 Lynne Talley (USA)
- 2002 Donald W. Forsyth (USA)
- 2001 David Karl (USA)
- 2000 William Jenkins (UK)
- 1999 I. Nicholas McCave (UK)
- 1998 Paul Falkowski (USA)
- 1997 Russ E. Davis (USA)
- 1996 Robert Detrick (USA)
- 1995 Victor S. Smetacek (Germany)
- 1994 Edward A. Boyle (USA)
- 1993 Robert A. Berner (USA)
- 1992 Trevor Platt (Canada)
- 1991 Gabriel T. Csanady (USA)
- 1990 Nicholas J. Shackleton
- 1989 Lawrence R. Pomeroy (USA)
- 1988 Carl Wunsch (USA)
- 1987 Xavier LePichon (France)
- 1986 Tom M. Fenchel (Denmark)
- 1985 Wallace S. Broecker (USA)
- 1984 Wolfgang H. Berger (USA)
- 1983 Reuben Lasker (USA)
- 1982 Christopher J.R. Garrett (Canada)
- 1981 John Tuzo Wilson (Canada)
- 1980 Ramon Margalef (Spain)
- 1980 Henry Melson Stommel (USA)
- 1980 Dan Peter Mackenzie (UK)

== See also ==
- List of oceanography awards
