= Alice Alldredge =

American oceanographer and marine biologist

- Born: Alice Louise Alldredge; February 1, 1949 (age 77); Denver, Colorado
- Occupations: Oceanographer, marine biologist
- Known for: expert in marine snow
- Spouse: James M. King

Alice Louise Alldredge (February 1, 1949) is an American oceanographer and marine biologist who studies marine snow, carbon cycling, microbes and plankton in the ecology of the ocean. She was one of the most cited scientific researchers for some time starting in 2003.

== Early life and education ==
Alldredge was born in 1949 in Denver, Colorado. She graduated from Merrit Hutton High School in Thornton, Colorado, and completed an undergraduate degree in biology at Carleton College in 1971. Her father was an inspiration to her interest in science and her mother was a role-model as well.

== Career ==
Alldredge continued her education to earn a PhD in 1975 from the University of California, Davis. Between 1975 and 1976, she studied at the Australian Institute of Marine Science as a NATO Postdoctoral Fellow. She joined the faculty of the University of California, Santa Barbara in 1976 and has conducted research on ocean ecology.

Alldredge has conducted research in the open sea, at her laboratory at the University of California, Santa Barbara as well as in collaboration with the Long Term Ecological Research Network (LTER) at the Mo'orea Coral Reef Long Term Ecological Research Site (MCR LTER) in Mo'orea, French Polynesia.

Alldredge discovered the existence of abundant gel particles called Transparent Exopolymer Particles (TEP) and demersal zooplankton, describing their migration and dispersion throughout coral reefs, seagrass meadows, and tidal sandflats. She is an authority on the cycling in the sea of carbon andmarine snow, particles such as algae, bacteria, and debris from the upper ocean that slowly sink to the sea floor as sediments. Through her work on marine snow, Alldredge changed the understanding of particle flux and she made the first quantification of observed sinking rates of marine snow, "showing that marine snow sinks rapidly enough to deliver significant amounts of organic carbon to the deep [sea]". Alice Alldredge also discovered that copepods in the marine food web were using larvacean houses as a primary food source in a pelagic environment. Alldredge is currently researching the source of marine snow, the communities that inhabit it, and snow degredation.

In addition to her teaching and research at UC-Santa Barbara, Alldredge works at the Mo'orea Coral Reef as a researcher with the LTER Study in Mo'orea, French Polynesia studying the currents and forces effecting water transport of the island. In addition to evaluating the biological effect of zooplankton and fish on the reef, scientists are evaluating the biochemical characteristics and differences between waters over the reef and offshore waters. Alldredge has been credited for her role in UC-Santa Barbara's ranking as 7th best university worldwide based on its global scientific impact and collaboration record. She is in the top 0.1% of the ISI Web of Knowledge's highly cited researchers and has remained there since 2003.

Alldredge became the chair of the Department of Ecology, Evolution, and Marine Biology at UC-Santa Barbara in 2004.

== Awards and honors ==
In 1990, Alldredge was elected as a Fellow of the American Association for the Advancement of Science, in 1992 she won the Henry Bryant Bigelow Medal from the Woods Hole Oceanographic Institution, and in 1995, she was awarded the first chair of UC-Santa Barbara's graduate program in Marine Science, which she held until 2004 and was awarded $5,000. In 1996, she was honored with a Distinguished Teaching Award for Sciences from UC-Santa Barbara, and in 1998 was selected as a Fellow of the American Geophysical Union.

In 2008, she was awarded the G. Evelyn Hutchinson Award from the American Society of Limnology and Oceanography and in 2011 received the Alumni Association Distinguished Achievement Award from Carleton College. In 2026, she was elected into the American Academy of Arts and Sciences.

== Selected Publications ==
- Characteristics, dynamics and significance of marine snow. Alice L Alldredge and Mary W Silver. 1988. Progress in Oceanography.
- Intense hydrolytic enzyme activity on marine aggregates and implications for rapid particle dissolution. David C Smith, Meinhard Simon, Alice L Alldredge, and Farooq Azam. 1992. Nature.
- Phylogenetic diversity of aggregate-attached vs. free-living marine bacterial assemblages. Edward F DeLong, Diana G Franks and Alice L Alldredge. 1993. Limnology and Oceanography.
- The abundance and significance of a class of large, transparent organic particles in the ocean. Alice L Alldredge, Uta Passow and Bruce E Logan. 1993. Deep Sea Research Part I: Oceanographic Research Papers.
- The oceanic gel phase: a bridge in the DOM–POM continuum. Pedro Verdugo, Alice L Alldredge, Farooq Azam, David L Kirchman, Uta Passow, Peter H Santschi. 2004. Marine Chemistry.

== Personal life ==
Alldredge has three children with her husband, James M. King. She has expressed gratitude for being able to balance family life along with studies and research. Alldredge and her family live in Goleta, California, and in addition to her work, she is a leader of a Buddhist meditation community in the Santa Barbara area.
