= Alan Longhurst =

British-born Canadian oceanographer (1925–2023)

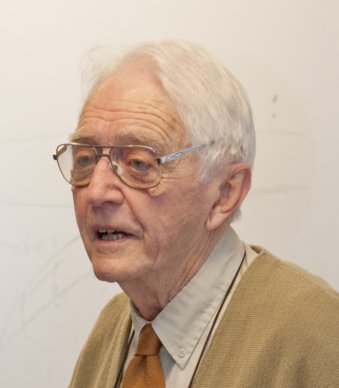
- Longhurst in 2015
- Born: 5 March 1925; Plymouth, England
- Died: 7 December 2023 (aged 98)
- Known for: Ecological Geography of the Sea
- Scientific career
- Fields: Biological oceanography, Marine ecology, Fisheries science
- Workplaces: Bedford Institute of Oceanography; Southwest Fisheries Science Center

Alan Reece Longhurst (5 March 1925 – 7 December 2023) was a British-born Canadian oceanographer who invented the Longhurst-Hardy Plankton Recorder, and is widely known for his contributions to the primary scientific literature, together with his numerous monographs, most notably the "Ecological Geography of the Sea". He led an effort that produced the first estimate of global primary production in the oceans using satellite imagery, and also quantified vertical carbon flux through the planktonic ecosystem via the biological pump. In later life he offered several critical reviews of several aspects of fishery management science and climate change science.

== Early life and education ==
Alan Longhurst was born in Plymouth, England, the son of a naval dental surgeon. He spent four years in the British army, graduating from the Royal Military Academy Sandhurst at the end of the war (1945). He then went to take part in the Allied occupation of Austria, ending up in Somalia and Abyssinia with the East African forces.

After the war, he returned to London for a degree in entomology and then a doctoral degree in zoology (1952) at the Bedford College of the University of London (England) on the ecology and taxonomy of Notostraca, a small group of living‐fossil, fresh‐water crustaceans.

== Career ==
Early in his career, Longhurst studied the ecology of benthic communities and demersal fish on the continental shelf of the Gulf of Guinea (1954–1963) during service at the West African Fisheries Research Institute in Freetown, Sierra Leone and the Federal Fisheries Service in Lagos, Nigeria. In the middle of this early period, he took a job for less than a year in Wellington at the Fishery Department of New Zealand and worked on racial differences in snappers. Subsequently, he focused on the trophic structure and flux of energy through the pelagic ecosystems of the eastern Pacific Ocean (1963–1971), the Barents Sea (1973), the eastern Canadian Arctic (1983–1989) and the Northwest Atlantic Ocean (1978–1994). He coordinated the international EASTROPAC expeditions in the 1960s and was the first Director of the Southwest Fisheries Science Center of the US National Marine Fisheries Service in La Jolla, California (1967–1971). Returning to England in 1971, he accepted a position as the Deputy Director of the Institute for Marine Environmental Research in Plymouth. Later, in Canada, he was Director of the Marine Ecology Laboratory at the Bedford Institute of Oceanography, Nova Scotia (1977–1979). His final administrative appointment was as Director-General of that Institute (1980–1986). He later turned down the position of Assistant Deputy Minister of Science at the national headquarters of the Department of Fisheries and Oceans (Government of Canada) in favour of going "back to the bench" as a research scientist.

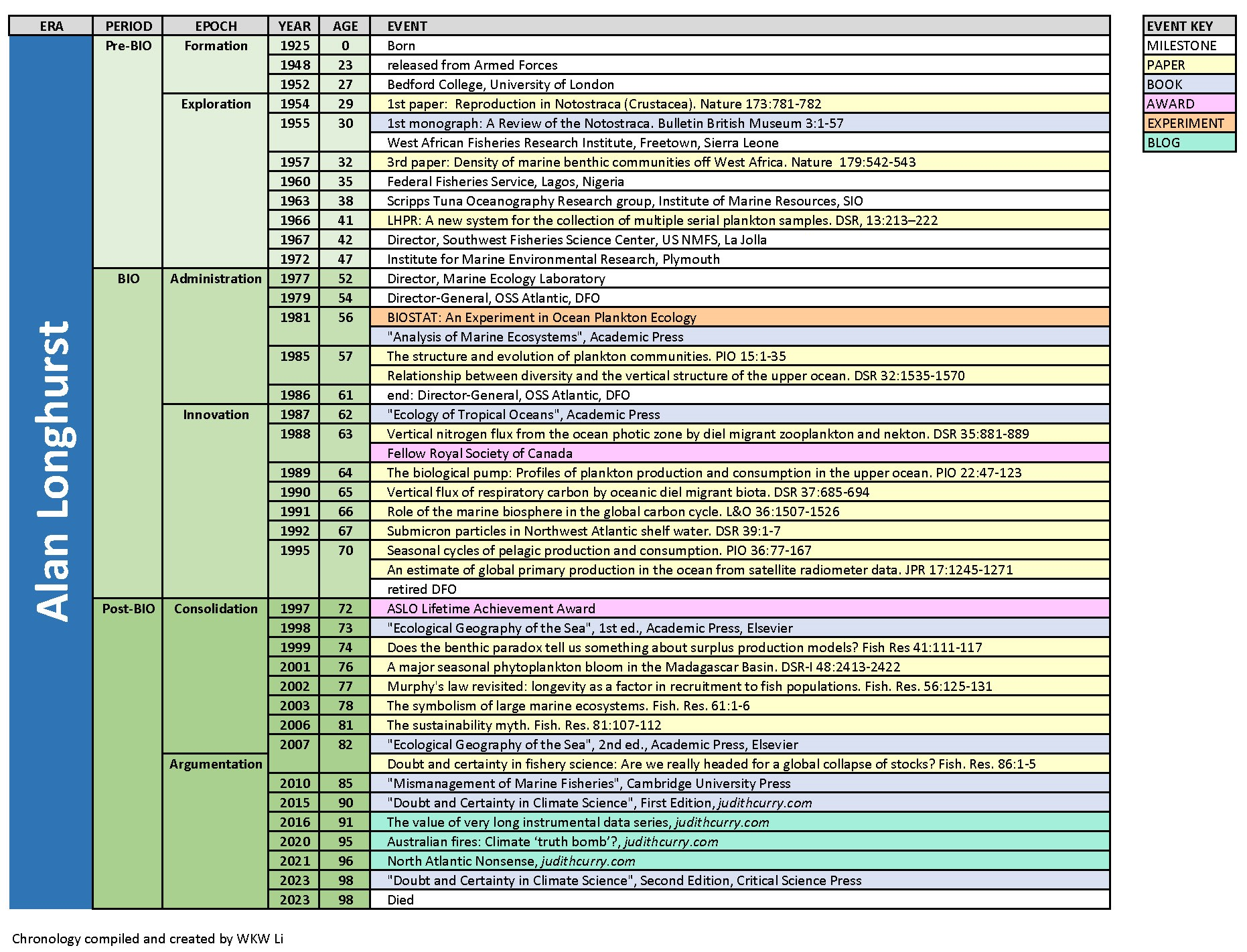
Milestones in the career of Alan Longhurst

Longhurst has published more than 80 research papers and his most recent books are "Ecological Geography of the Sea" (1st edition 1998, 2nd edition 2007) and "Mismanagement of Marine Fisheries" (2010). He has also written on "Doubt and Certainty in Climate Science" from a personal perspective. After retirement in 1995, he and his wife Françoise opened and operated Galerie l'Acadie, a not-for-profit gallery of contemporary art in Cajarc, France.

== Death ==
Longhurst died on 7 December 2023, at the age of 98.

== Awards ==
In 1988, Longhurst was elected a Fellow of the Royal Society of Canada. In 1991, he was awarded the Gold Medal by the Professional Institute of the Public Service of Canada for his cumulative influence in the development of Canadian oceanography. In 1997, he received the A.C. Redfield Lifetime Achievement Award from the Association for the Sciences of Limnology and Oceanography "in recognition of sustained excellence in the study of marine food webs and biogeography, and of outstanding leadership in the development of international collaboration and in the administration of world-renowned oceanographic programs".

== Ecological Geography of the Sea ==
"Ecological Geography of the Sea" is a book on the regional geography of the world ocean for ecologists. According to Longhurst, regional oceanographic processes are paramount in moulding the characteristics of regional ecosystems. A central argument of this book is that spatial bounds to ocean ecosystems can be set by reference to features of the physical circulation of the oceans rather than to the distribution of individual species.

The root of this approach to a global organisation of the biological seascape is by construction of a typology for seasonal cycles of pelagic production and consumption. The well-known Sverdrup critical depth concept for the induction of phytoplankton growth forced by local mixing and light is the starting point for the seasonal evolution of primary production, and this is very much related to regional oceanography. However, the accumulation or loss of phytoplankton biomass is influenced by secondary processes, such as variation in the size of the herbivore population at the start of the bloom. In extending the Sverdrup model to all parts of the ocean, a typology of plankton cycles is necessary that describes a continuum from strongly seasonal regions with seasonal recharge of photic zone nutrients to weakly seasonal regions where nutrient renewal of the photic zone is slow or episodic and where productivity is largely fuelled by internal nutrient regeneration. Along this continuum, phytoplankton and zooplankton exhibit characteristic features of ecological structure and function that arise as outcomes of systemic behaviour.

A full exposition of this organisational scheme into a rational partition of the global ocean was a landmark in many respects. In essence, this ecological geography addresses the fundamental issues of pelagic ecology and biogeography, which distil to whether, at some level of probability, a deduction may be made about the characteristic features of any region. Here, the definition of the region is crucial since it determines the scale of the biological seascape. By placing the typology of seasonal plankton cycles into the context of regional oceanography, characteristic features of ecology can be discerned at two hierarchical scales. The higher level comprises a small number of large compartments (biomes), and the lower level comprises a large number of smaller compartments (provinces), each designated with a unique four-letter code.

An initial proof-of-concept for the Ecological Geography of the Sea was demonstrated by estimating global primary production using satellite radiometer data partitioned into biogeochemical domains and provinces. This influential work was published in 1995 with co-authors Shubha Sathyendranath, Trevor Platt, and Carla Caverhill, and stands as the most highly cited paper in the Journal of Plankton Research. Parenthetically, the first paper in the first issue of the first volume of this journal which appeared in 1979 was also authored by Longhurst.

The first edition of the Ecological Geography of the Sea (1998) dealt only with the planktonic ecosystem. It was reviewed in Nature, Science, Limnology and Oceanography, and Trends in Ecology and Evolution, amongst others. The second edition (2007) included considerations of the strong coupling between benthic and pelagic processes that occur over continental shelves, and between plankton and larger pelagic organisms.
