= Jessica Ware =

American entomologist

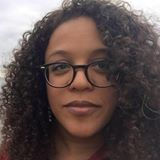
- Born: Jessica Lee Ware; Montreal, Quebec
- Education: University of British Columbia; Rutgers University
- Known for: Work on phylogenomics of insect evolution
- Scientific career
- Fields: Entomology; Evolutionary biology
- Workplaces: American Museum of Natural History; Rutgers University

Jessica Lee Ware is a Canadian-American evolutionary biologist and entomologist. She is curator and chair of the Division of invertebrate zoology at the American Museum of Natural History in New York City. In addition, she is a principal investigator at the Institute for Comparative Genomics and a professor for the Richard Gilder Graduate School.

Ware has served as president of the Entomological Society of America, and as President of the Worldwide Dragonfly Association. She is current president of the Society of Systematic Biologists. She studies the evolution of insect physiology and behavior, particularly dragonflies and Dictyoptera (cockroaches, termites and mantises), as well as their biogeography (geographic distribution). Ware was a contributor to a major study of the phylogenomics of insect evolution, and developed molecular phylogeny of Hexapoda (the group that contains insects and springtails, among others). Ware warns of the dangerous losses occurring in insect taxonomies, which are being reported as high as 80%.

== Early life and education ==
Jessica Lee Ware was born in 1977 in Montreal, Quebec, and has a twin brother, artist and activist Syrus Marcus Ware. Ware has said that she became interested in biology because her grandparents, Gwen and Harold Irons, in northern Canada encouraged her to collect snakes, insects, and frogs. Ware attended the University of Toronto Schools (UTS) for grades 7–13.

Ware earned a Bachelor of Science in invertebrate zoology from the University of British Columbia in Vancouver in 2001. She pursued entomology after a work-study position at the Spencer Entomological Museum at UBC, which helped to support her during her studies. Prior to that transition, she was pursuing a career in marine biology.

After graduating, Ware traveled to Costa Rica to work with Diane Srivastava for a semester. She reports that her time in Costa Rica inspired her to pursue research as a career, and it was also her first experience of working with other scientists of color.

Ware went directly from her bachelor's degree to the doctoral program at Rutgers University.She was awarded a PhD in 2008, with a dissertation titled, Molecular and morphological systematics of Libelluloidea (Odonata: Anisoptera) and Dictyoptera, an examination of the evolutionary history of the Libelluloidea superfamily of dragonflies.

== Career ==
In 2010, Ware became an assistant professor at Rutgers University, and was granted tenure in 2016. In 2020 she was hired as an assistant curator of Odonata & non-holometabolous insect orders at the American Museum of Natural History (AMNH) in Manhattan, New York, later becoming associate curator. She is helping to develop the Susan and Peter J. Solomon Family Insectarium at AMNH, which will explore the diversity and importance of insect orders. Ware is also a research associate at the National Museum of Natural History in Washington, D.C.

Ware contributed to a major study of the phylogenomics of insect evolution, and developed molecular phylogeny of Hexapoda. She has undertaken fieldwork in several continents.

Ware is active in encouraging women and people from under-represented groups to become entomologists. She was a featured speaker at the March for Science in Washington DC in 2017. She co-founded Entomologists of Color and co-organized #BlackInEnto week in February 2021.

She is a contributor to Entomology Today, and serves on the board of several entomological journals.

Ware has served on the Governing Board of the Entomological Society of America, representing the SysEB section. As of May 7, 2020, Ware was elected to become Vice President-Elect of the Entomological Society of America, starting her term as vice president in November 2020, and as president in November 2021.

From 2019 to 2021, she served as President of the Worldwide Dragonfly Association.

She has been on NOVA PBS shows about insect entomophagy, and butterflies. She has also been featured on Jonathan Van Ness's podcast Getting Curious. She was the narrator on the PBS Terra show Insectarium.

A resident of Cranbury, New Jersey, she has spoken to groups there to educate them about her field of expertise.

== Honors ==
- 2022, Fellow, California Academy of Sciences
- 2019, Presidential Early Career Award for Scientists and Engineers (PECASE) award, U.S. Government
- 2019, Leader in Faculty Diversity Award, Rutgers University, which "honors a select number of faculty who have been leaders in promoting diversity, inclusion, equity, and access at Rutgers, either through their own academic research, teaching, community engagement research, and other forms of engagement".
- 2017, SysEB Snodgrass Memorial Research Award, Entomological Society of America which recognizes "outstanding research by a graduate student".
- 2015, NSF Early CAREER Award, National Science Foundation
- 2008, John Henry Comstock Graduate Student Award, Entomological Society of America

== Personal life ==
Ware's maternal family is from England but they have lived in Canada since the early 20th century. Ware's paternal family are from the southern United States. Ware has dual citizenship.

Ware was married to another entomologist, however, they are now separated and she is a single parent to two children. Ware is bisexual.
