= Benjamin Halpern =

American marine biologist and ecologist

- Born: Benjamin S. Halpern
- Education: Carleton College (B.A. 1995); University of California, Santa Barbara (Ph.D. 2003)
- Employer: University of California, Santa Barbara
- Awards: 2016 A.G. Huntsman Award for Excellence in the Marine Sciences
- Website: halpernlab.bren.ucsb.edu

Benjamin S. Halpern is a marine biologist and ecologist currently working at the University of California, Santa Barbara. His research has addressed a broad range of questions that span local to global scales, including spatial population dynamics, trophic interactions in community ecology, and the interface between ecology and human dynamics, all with the ultimate aim of informing and facilitating conservation and resource management efforts in marine systems. He is widely known for his research on marine protected areas (MPAs), cumulative impacts from human activities, and more recently his leadership in developing the Ocean Health Index.

== Early life and education ==
Halpern was born in Eugene, Oregon, and spent his childhood there. He earned his B.A. in Biology from Carleton College in 1995, and a Ph.D. in Marine Ecology from the University of California, Santa Barbara in 2003.

== Career ==
After completing his Ph.D., Halpern held a joint Postdoctoral Fellowship through the David H. Smith program and the National Center for Ecological Analysis and Synthesis (NCEAS). He was then a Research Scientist based at NCEAS until 2013 when he started as faculty at UCSB's Bren School of Environmental Science & Management, a position he still holds, and held a Chair in Marine Conservation at Imperial College London until 2018. In 2016 he became Executive Director of NCEAS.

== Awards and honors ==
Halpern was the recipient of the 2016 A.G. Huntsman Award for Excellence in the Marine Sciences. In 2017, he was inducted as a Fellow in the California Academy of Sciences and won the Peter Benchley Ocean Award for Excellence in Science. In 2018, he was awarded the Ocean Award for Science; in 2020 he was elected a Fellow of the Ecological Society of America. In 2024 he was selected as a Selby Fellow by the Australian Academy of Science. He was also recognized by Thomson-Reuters as One of the World's Most Influential Scientific Minds.
