= Adina Paytan =

American-Israeli biogeochemist

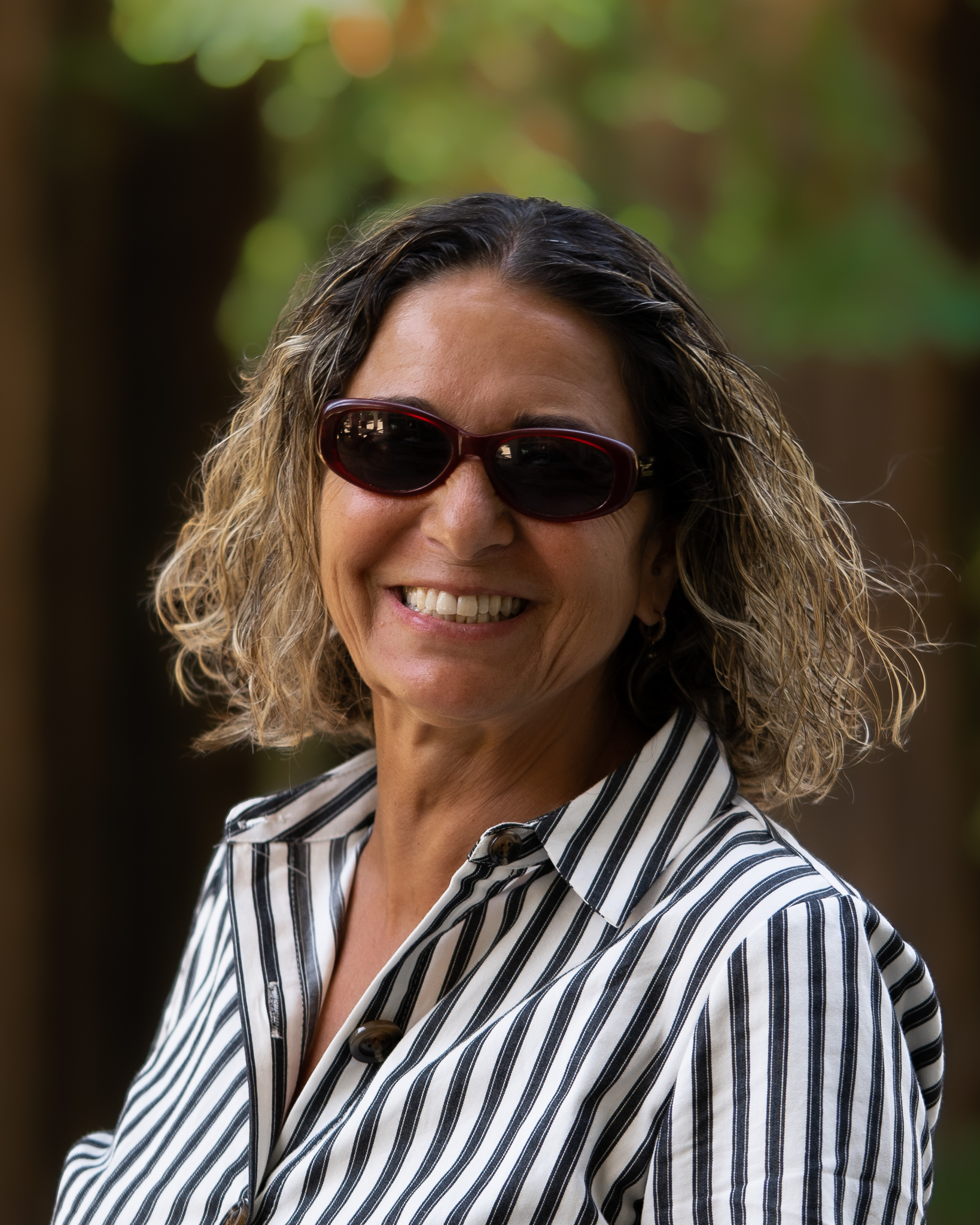
- Paytan in 2022
- Education: Hebrew University of Jerusalem; Scripps Institution of Oceanography
- Known for: research into biogeochemical cycling in the present and in the past
- Scientific career
- Fields: Biogeochemistry, Marine chemistry, and Paleoceanography
- Workplaces: Stanford University; University of California, Santa Cruz
- Doctoral advisor: Miriam Kastner

Adina Paytan is an American-Israeli biogeochemist. She is a distinguished professor in the Department of Earth and Planetary Science at the University of California, Santa Cruz. known for research into biogeochemical cycling in the present and the past. She has over 300 scientific publications in journals such as Science, Nature, Proceedings of the National Academy of Sciences, and Geophysical Research Letters.

== Early life and education ==
Paytan was born and raised in Israel. As an undergraduate, Paytan encountered geochemistry which she likens to a big complex puzzle. Paytan obtained undergraduate degrees in geology and biology (1985) and an M.S. degree in science education from the Weizmann Institute of Science (1987) and an M.S. in Earth Sciences Oceanography (1989) from Hebrew University of Jerusalem. Paytan's Ph.D. is from Scripps Institution of Oceanography (1996) where she worked with Miriam Kastner on using Barite as a recorder of ocean chemistry. After postdoctoral work at University of California, San Diego she moved to the Department of Geological and Environmental Sciences at Stanford University, and then onto a position at University of California, Santa Cruz.

== Career ==
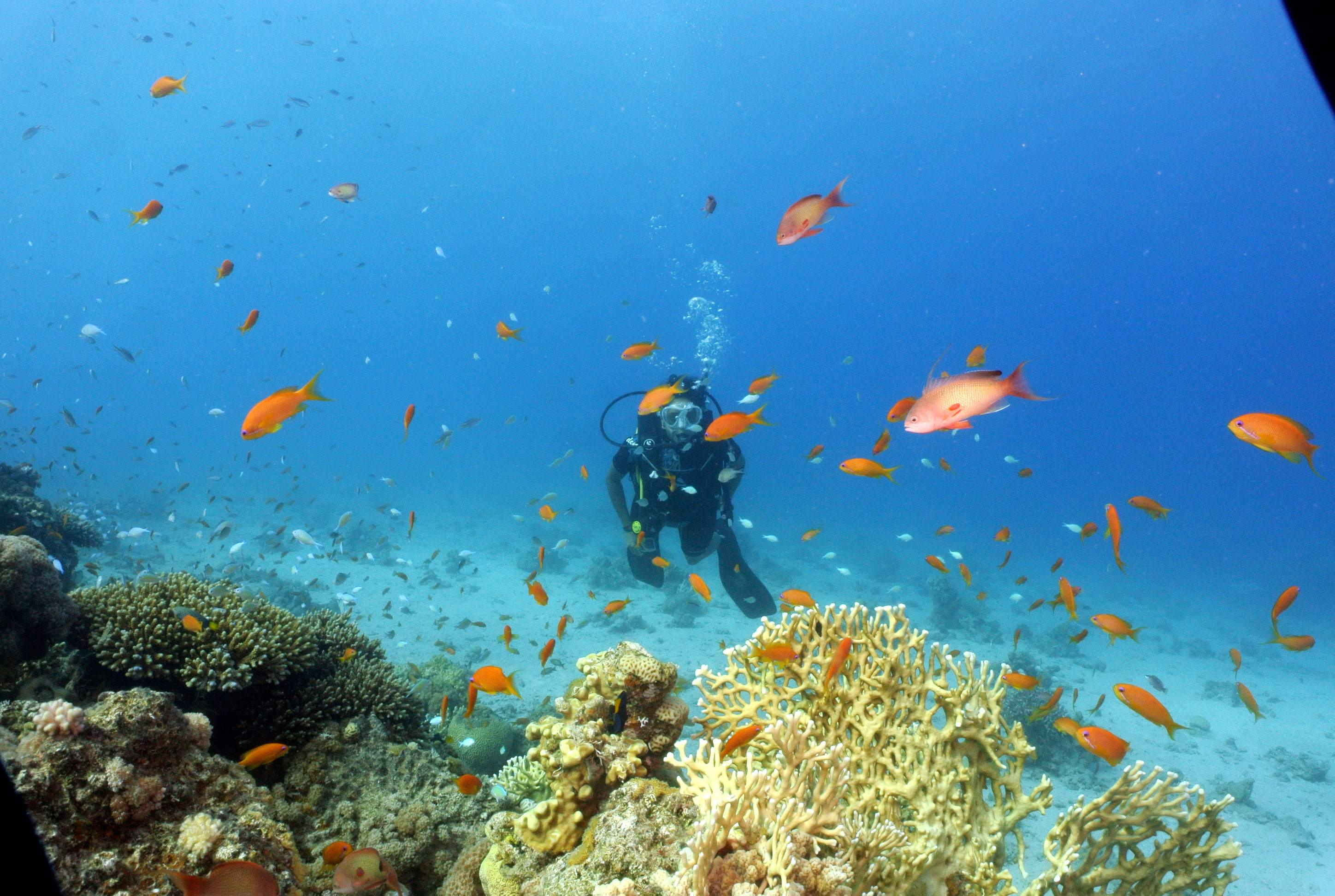
Adina Peyten Research on coral health in the Gulf of Aqaba

Paytan is both an interdisciplinary scientist and an advocate for STEM education and public outreach. As a scientist, Paytan uses isotopic and chemical signatures to examine global biogeochemical cycling. This includes studies of groundwater discharge into coastal systems, nutrient cycling, ocean acidification, and paleoceanography. This research includes high resolution measurements of carbon and sulfur isotopes to characterize changes in the marine and atmospheric carbon cycle, using strontium isotopes within barite to infer changes in the global carbon cycle over geologic time, and modern investigations of groundwater discharge as a source of nutrients to the coastal ocean and coral reefs.

Paytan also deliberately works on STEM education and public outreach, and obtained an M.S. in Science Education from the Weizmann Institute in 1987. Paytan served as a mentor for the Centers for Ocean Sciences Education Excellence (COSEE) where she advocated for the role of universities in conducting public outreach. Paytan started the GeoKids program at Stanford in order to educate elementary school children about science. Paytan also mentors masters and Ph.D. students in her lab.

== Awards ==
- ASLO - Tommy and Yvette Edmondson Distinguished Service Award (2024)
- Honorary Professor, Ben Gurion University of the Negev, Israel (2023)
- Vernadsky Medal, EGU for Exceptional Contributions to Biogeoscience (2022)
- Fulbright Scholar in Marine Resources, Portugal (2020)
- A.G. Huntsman Award for Excellence in Marine Science (2019)
- Fellow, American Geophysical Union (2018)
- Fellow, Association for the Sciences of Limnology and Oceanography (ASLO, 2016)
- Dansgaard Award, AGU mid-career Paleoceanography Award (2015)
- Fellow, Geochemical Society (2014)
- American Geophysical Union's Rachel Carson Lecture (2013)
- Excellence Chair of the Prof. Dr. Werner Petersen Foundation from GEOMAR
- American Geophysical Union's Ocean Sciences Early Career Award (2004)
- Elected to the National Academy of Sciences (2026)
