= Jeffrey A. Hutchings =

Canadian fisheries biologist (1958–2022)

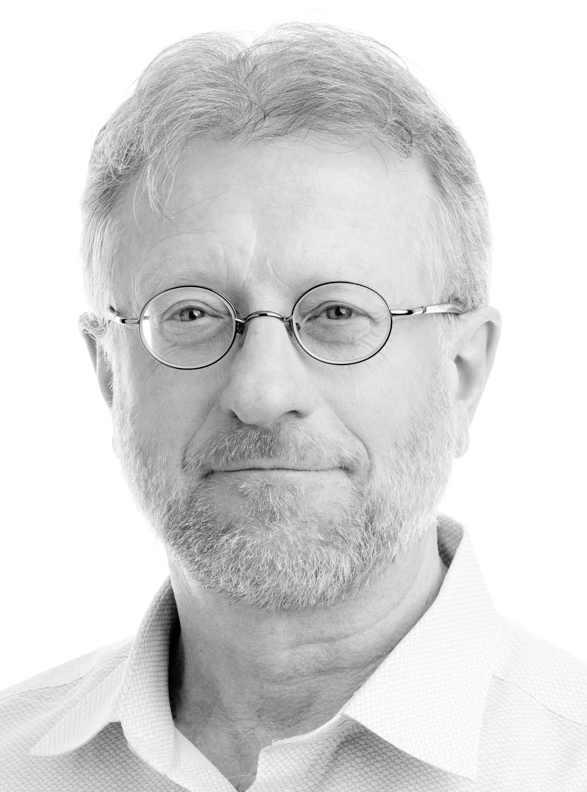
- Born: September 11, 1958; Orillia, Ontario, Canada
- Died: January 30, 2022 (aged 63); Halifax, Nova Scotia, Canada
- Occupations: Evolutionary ecologist, fisheries scientist
- Scientific career
- Fields: Biology
- Workplaces: Dalhousie University
- Thesis: The evolutionary significance of life history divergence among brook trout (Salvelinus fontinalis) populations. (1991)
- Doctoral advisor: Doug Morris

Jeffrey Alexander Hutchings FRSC (September 11, 1958 – January 30, 2022) was a Canadian fisheries scientist. He was a professor of biology, and the Izaak Walton Killam Memorial Chair in Fish, Fisheries, and Oceans at Dalhousie University.

== Early life ==
Hutchings was born in Orillia, Ontario, on September 11, 1958. He graduated from the University of Toronto with a Bachelor of Science, before obtaining a Master of Science from Memorial University of Newfoundland. He was subsequently awarded a Doctor of Philosophy from Memorial in 1991.

== Career ==
After graduating from Memorial, Hutchings first worked at the University of Edinburgh and at Fisheries and Oceans Canada (DFO) in St. John's, Newfoundland and Labrador. He later joined the Department of Biology at Dalhousie University in 1995, eventually becoming Killam Memorial Chair in Fish, Fisheries and Oceans. Hutchings was known for his work on the evolution of fish life histories and on the collapse, recovery, and sustainable harvesting of marine fishes. He authored three books (including A Primer of Life Histories: Ecology, Evolution, and Application, published the year before his death), as well as more than 250 journal articles. He also sat on the editorial boards of eight scientific journals (including the Proceedings of the Royal Society B, Canadian Journal of Fisheries and Aquatic Sciences, Functional Ecology, Transactions of the American Fisheries Society, and Ecological Applications).

Hutchings was the co-founder and president of the Canadian Society for Ecology and Evolution from 2012 to 2014. In addition to being Chair of a 2012 Royal Society of Canada Expert Panel on Marine Biodiversity (and member of a 2001 Expert Panel on genetically modified foods), he chaired Canada's national science body (Committee on the Status of Endangered Wildlife in Canada) responsible, by law, for advising the Canadian federal Minister of the Environment on species at risk of extinction. He was called to testify before the Canadian House of Commons Standing Committee on Fisheries and Oceans on multiple occasions, including in December 1997, March 2012, as well as May and October 2016. He also gave evidence before the Standing Committee on Environment and Sustainable Development in May 2009. He discussed overfishing in Canada, sustainable fishery, and the impact of climate change on this endeavour. Hutchings vigorously strived to keep science independent of politics, and was critical of efforts by the Conservative government in 2012 that were broadly perceived as attempting to silence scientific views on climate change and fish conservation. He later applauded the subsequent Liberal government four years later for adding more scientific staff to the DFO.

Hutchings died on January 30, 2022, at his home in Halifax, Nova Scotia. His cause of death has not yet been disclosed. He was 63 years old.

== Awards and honours ==
Hutchings was elected Fellow of the Royal Society of Canada (Academy of Science) in September 2015. Two years later, he was awarded the international A.G. Huntsman Award for Excellence in the Marine Sciences. He was elected Fellow of the Norwegian Academy of Science and Letters in 2018.

== Publications ==
=== Books ===
- Hutchings, J. A. (2021). A Primer of Life Histories: Ecology, Evolution, and Application. Oxford University Press, Oxford, UK. ISBN 978-0-19-257625-5
- Freedman, B., Hutchings, J. A., Gwynne, D. T., Smol, J. P., Suffling, R., Turkington, R., Walker, R. L., and D. Bazely. (2015). Ecology: A Canadian Context. Nelson Education, Toronto. ISBN 978-0-17-650114-3
- Hutchings, J. A., Côté, I. M., Dodson, J. J., Fleming, I. A., Jennings, S., Mantua, N. J., Peterman, R. M., Riddell, B. E., Weaver, A. J., and VanderZwaag, D. L. (2012). Sustaining Canadian marine biodiversity: responding to the challenges posed by climate change, fisheries, and aquaculture. Royal Society of Canada, Ottawa.

=== Journal articles (selected) ===
- Hutchings, J.A. 2000. Collapse and recovery of marine fishes. Nature 406: 882–885.
- Crozier, L.G., and J.A. Hutchings. 2014. Plastic and evolutionary responses to climate change in fish. Evolutionary Applications 7: 68–87.
- Neubauer, P., Jensen, O.P., Hutchings, J.A., and J.K. Baum. 2013. Resilience and recovery of overexploited marine populations. Science 340: 347–349.
- Myers, R.A., Barrowman, N.J., Hutchings, J.A., and A.A. Rosenberg. 1995. Population dynamics of exploited fish stocks at low population levels. Science 269: 1106–1108.
- Hutchings, J.A. 2015. Thresholds for impaired species recovery. Proceedings of the Royal Society B 282: 20150654.
- Kuparinen, A., and J.A. Hutchings. 2017. Genetic architecture of age at maturity can generate divergent and disruptive harvest-induced evolution. Philosophical Transactions of the Royal Society B 372: 20160035.
- Hutchings, J.A., and J.D. Reynolds. 2004. Marine fish population collapses: consequences for recovery and extinction risk. BioScience 54: 297–309.
- Hutchings, J.A., Walters, C., and R.L. Haedrich. 1997. Is scientific inquiry incompatible with government information control? Can. J. Fish. Aquat. Sci. 54: 1198–1210.
- Hutchings, J.A., and R.A. Myers. 1994. What can be learned from the collapse of a renewable resource? Atlantic cod, Gadus morhua, of Newfoundland and Labrador. Can. J. Fish. Aquat. Sci. 51: 2126–2146.
- Hutchings, J.A., and R.A. Myers. 1994. The evolution of alternative mating strategies in variable environments. Evolutionary Ecology 8: 256–268.
- Hutchings, J.A. 1993. Adaptive life histories effected by age-specific survival and growth rate. Ecology 74: 673–684.
- Hutchings, J.A. 1991. Fitness consequences of variation in egg size and food abundance in brook trout, Salvelinus fontinalis. Evolution 45: 1162–1168.
