= Gregor Hagedorn =

German botanist (born 1965)

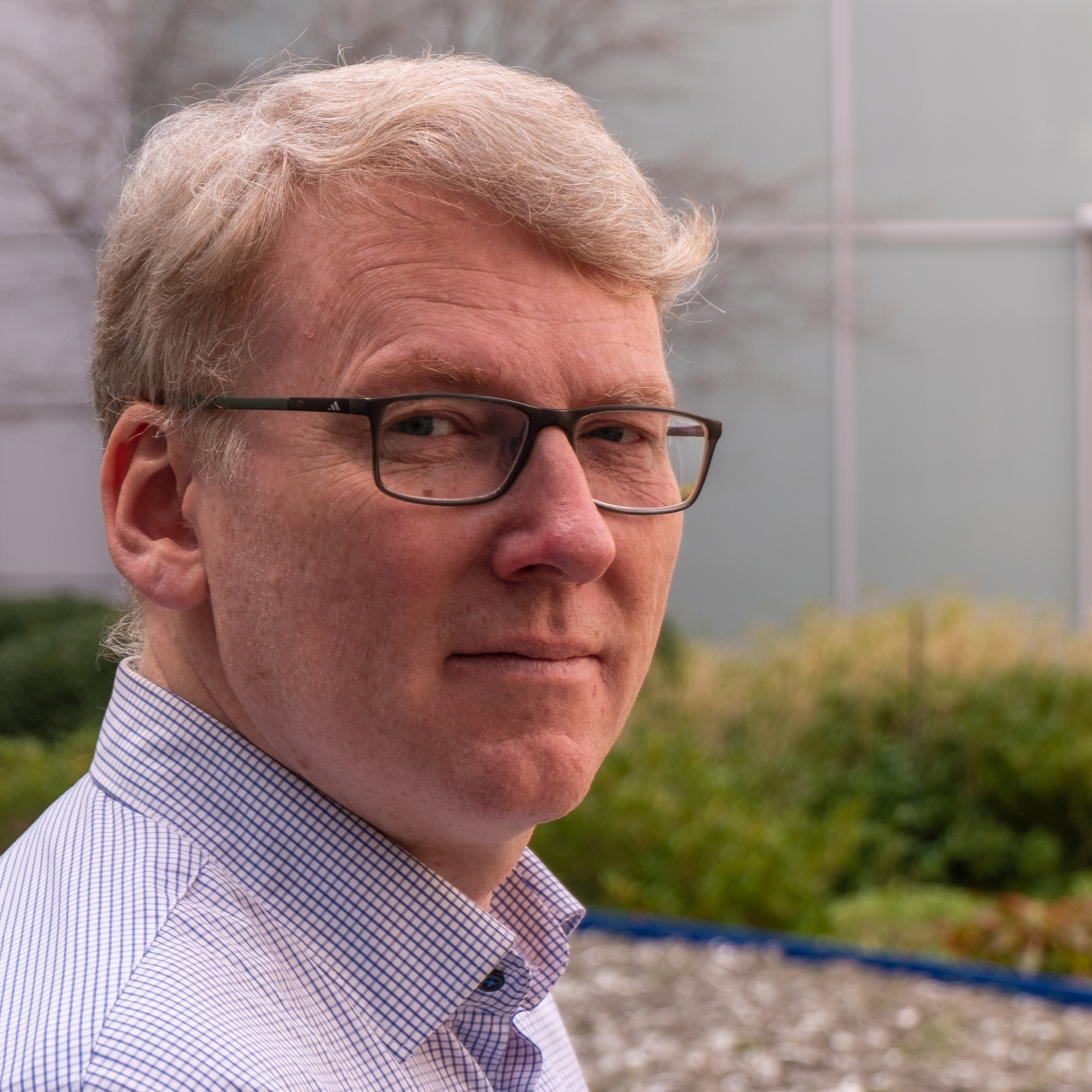
- Hagedorn in 2019
- Born: 1965 (age 60–61); Gelsenkirchen, West Germany
- Education: University of Tübingen; Duke University
- Scientific career
- Fields: Botanists
- Workplaces: University of Bayreuth; Julius Kühn-Institut; Natural History Museum, Berlin

Gregor Hagedorn (born 1965) is a German botanist and academic director at the Natural History Museum, Berlin.

== Life ==
Gregor Hagedorn studied biology at the University of Tübingen and at Duke University (North Carolina). Afterwards, he worked in the Department of Mycology at the University of Bayreuth until 2007. In 2007 his dissertation on "Structuring Descriptive Data of Organisms – Requirement Analysis and Information Models"was completed at the University of Bayreuth with Gerhard Rambold as supervisor.

From 1992 to 2013 he was a staff member at the Federal Biological Research Centre for Agriculture and Forestry, now Julius Kühn Institute. He played a major role in the development of a data standard for describing gender within the Taxonomic Databases Working Group.

Since 2013, Hagedorn has been working at the Museum of Natural History Berlin, first as Head of Digital World and Information Science (until 2016), then as Academic Director.

Between 2014 and 2018 Hagedorn was a member of the German National Council for Information Infrastructures as a representative of the scientific organisations.

== Scientists for Future ==
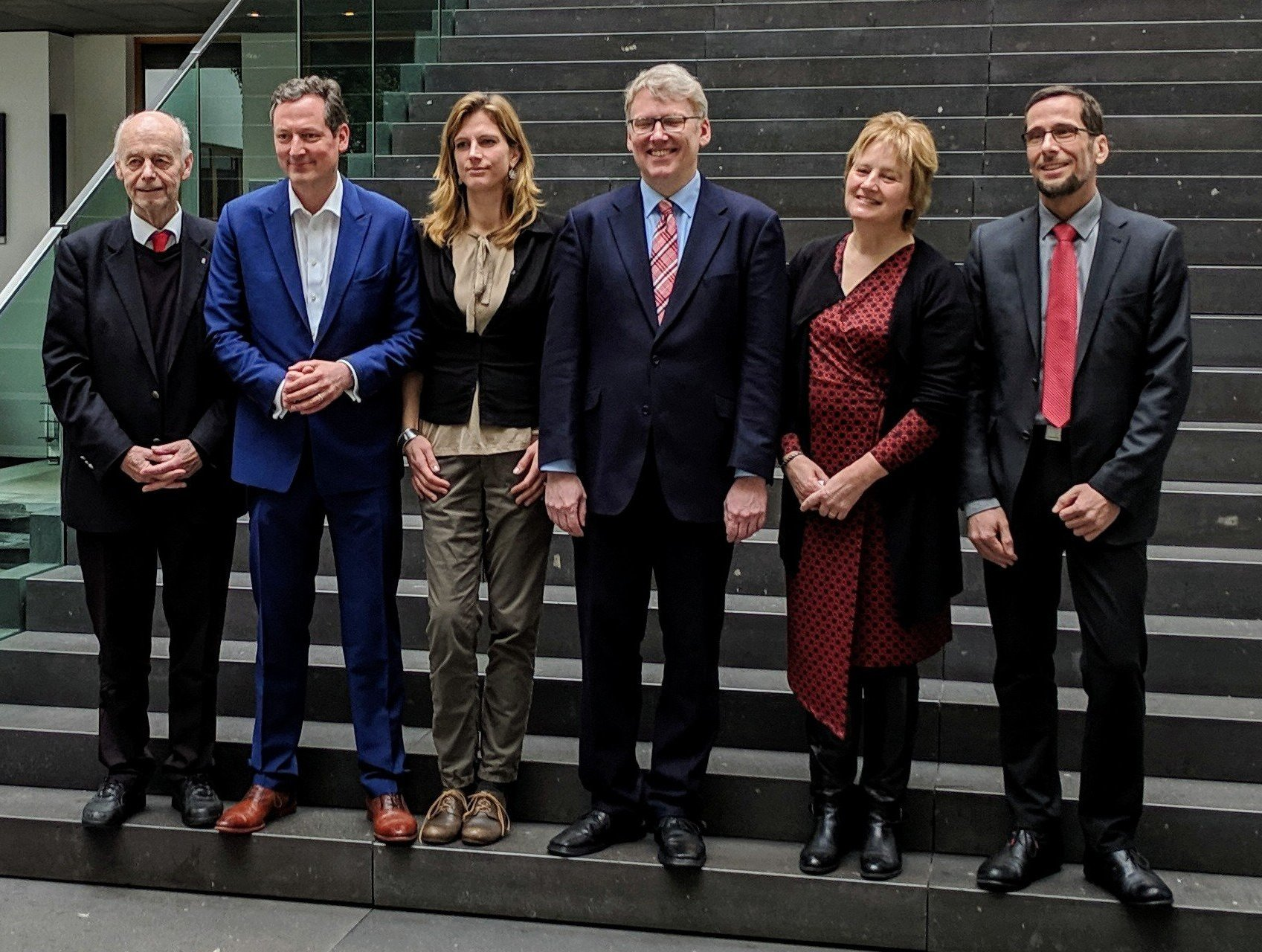
Detlev Ganten, Eckart von Hirschhausen, Maja Göpel, Gregor Hagedorn, Karen Helen Wiltshire and Volker Quaschning (from left to right) at the presentation of the #Scientists4Future statement on 12 March 2019 in Berlin before the Federal Press Conference

Together with other scientists, Hagedorn founded the grassroots movement Scientists for Future (S4F) in March 2019. This initiative was inspired by a group of Belgian scientists who had earlier offered their support to the nascent Fridays for Future movement in January 2019 under the banner of Scientists for Climate. The first statement by Scientists For Future was written by a circle of 30 people and signed by 26,800 scientists in Germany, Switzerland, and Austria. The key authors also published a similar statement in Science with scientists from the United States, including Michael Mann and Katharine Hayhoe. Hagedorn represented Scientists for Future at an environmental meeting with the German Federal President Frank-Walter Steinmeier in early 2020. In late‑2021, Hagedorn presented a TEDx talk in Potsdam on the topic of sustainability.

== Awards ==
- 2016: Badge of Honour by the German Phytomedical Society for his commitment to create a phytomedical wiki for phytomedical terms and definitions
- 2019: Best Paper Award from GAIA Verlag for the publication The concerns of the young protesters are justified. A statement by Scientists for Future
- 2019: Federal Sustainability Prize in the Politics category of the German Sustainability Association for Hagedorn and the Scientists For Future

== Bibliography ==
- Guy Pe'er; Aletta Bonn; Helge Bruelheide; Petra Dieker; Nico Eisenhauer; Peter H. Feindt; Gregor Hagedorn; Bernd Hansjürgens; Irina Herzon; Ângela Lomba; Elisabeth Marquard; Francisco Moreira; Heike Nitsch; Rainer Oppermann; Andrea Perino; Norbert Röder; Christian Schleyer; Stefan Schindler; Christine Wolf; Yves Zinngrebe; Sebastian Lakner (2020). "Action needed for the EU Common Agricultural Policy to address sustainability challenges". People and Nature. 2 (2). People and Nature Volume 2: 305–316. Bibcode:2020PeoNa...2..305P. doi:10.1002/pan3.10080. PMC 7334041. PMID 32626843.
- Hagedorn, Gregor (2019). Die Zukunft ist vorhersagbar – Neue Allianzen im Naturschutz (in German). DNT-Journal 2019. ISBN 978-3-9815431-8-6.
- Gregor Hagedorn; Peter Kalmus; Michael Mann; Sara Vicca; Joke Van den Berge; Jean-Pascal van Ypersele; Dominique Bourg; Jan Rotmans; Roope Kaaronen; Stefan Rahmstorf; Helga Kromp-Kolb; Gottfried Kirchengast; Reto Knutti; Sonia I. Seneviratne; Philippe Thalmann; Raven Cretney; Alison Green; Kevin Anderson; Martin Hedberg; Douglas Nilsson; Amita Kuttner; Katharine Hayhoe (2019). "Concerns of young protesters are justified. Vol 364". Science. 364 (6436): 139–140. Bibcode:2019Sci...364..139H. doi:10.1126/science.aax3807. PMID 30975882. S2CID 109938625.
- Hagedorn, Gregor; Loew, Thomas; Seneviratne, Sonia I.; Lucht, Wolfgang; Beck, Marie-Luise; Hesse, Janina; Knutti, Reto; Quaschning, Volker; Schleimer, Jan-Hendrik; Mattauch, Linus; Breyer, Christian; Hübener, Heike; Kirchengast, Gottfried; Chodura, Alice; Clausen, Jens; Creutzig, Felix; Darbi, Marianne; Daub, Claus-Heinrich; Ekardt, Felix; Göpel, Maja; Judith N., Hardt; Hertin, Julia; Hickler, Thomas; Köhncke, Arnulf; Köster, Stephan; Krohmer, Julia; Kromp-Kolb, Helga; Leinfelder, Reinhold; Mederake, Linda; Neuhaus, Michael; Rahmstorf, Stefan; Schmidt, Christine; Schneider, Christoph; Schneider, Gerhard; Seppelt, Ralf; Spindler, Uli; Springmann, Marco; Staab, Katharina; Stocker, Thomas F.; Steininger, Karl; Hirschhausen, Eckart von; Winter, Susanne; Wittau, Martin; Zens, Josef (2019). The concerns of the young protesters are justified: A statement by Scientists for Future concerning the protests for more climate protection (PDF). GAIA.
- Hagedorn, Gregor (2019). Scientists for Future: Aufklärung gegen die Klimakrise (in German). Blätter für deutsche und internationale Politik.
- Hans-Otto Baral; Evi Weber; Walter Gams; Gregor Hagedorn; Bin Liu; Xingzhong Liu; Guy Marson; Ludmila Marvanová; Marc Stadler & Michael Weiß. Generic names in the Orbiliaceae (Orbiliomycetes) and recommendations on which names should be protected or suppressed. Mycological Progress volume 17.
- David J Patterson; Willi Egloff; Donat Agosti; David Eades; Nico Franz; Gregor Hagedorn; Jonathan A Rees & David P Remsen (2014). "Scientific names of organisms: attribution, rights, and licensing". BMC Research Notes. 7 (1) 79. BMC Research Notes volume 7. Bibcode:2014BMCRN...7...79P. doi:10.1186/1756-0500-7-79. PMC 3922623. PMID 24495358. S2CID 1106470.
- Yde de Jong; Melina Verbeek; Verner Michelsen; Per de Place Bjørn; Wouter Los; Fedor Steeman; Nicolas Bailly; Claire Basire; Przemek Chylarecki; Eduard Stloukal; Gregor Hagedorn; Florian Tobias Wetzel; Falko Glöckler; Alexander Kroupa; Günther Korb; Anke Hoffmann; Christoph Häuser; Andreas Kohlbecker; Andreas Müller; Anton Güntsch; Pavel Stoev; Lyubomir Penev (2014). "Fauna Europaea – all European animal species on the web". Biodiversity Data Journal. 2 (2) e4034. Biodivers Data J.(2). Bibcode:2014BioDJ...2.4034D. doi:10.3897/BDJ.2.e4034. PMC 4206781. PMID 25349527.
- Muhammad Farooq Nasir; Gregor Hagedorn; Carmen Büttner; Christoph Reichmuth & Matthias Schöller (2013). "Molecular identification of Trichogramma species from Pakistan, using ITS-2 region of rDNA". Biocontrol. 58 (4). BioControl volume 58: 483–491. Bibcode:2013BioCo..58..483N. doi:10.1007/s10526-013-9509-z. S2CID 8782841.
- Michael Balke; Stefan Schmidt; Axel Hausmann; Emmanuel FA Toussaint; Johannes Bergsten; Matthew Buffington; Christoph L Häuser; Alexander Kroupa; Gregor Hagedorn; Alexander Riedel; Andrew Polaszek; Rosichon Ubaidillah; Lars Krogmann; Andreas Zwick; Martin Fikáček; Jiří Hájek; Mariano C Michat; Christopher Dietrich; John La Salle; Beth Mantle; Peter KL Ng & Donald Hobern (2013). "Biodiversity into your hands – A call for a virtual global natural history 'metacollection'". Frontiers in Zoology. 10 (1). Frontiers in Zoology volume 10: 55. Bibcode:2013FrZoo..10...55B. doi:10.1186/1742-9994-10-55. PMC 3848749. PMID 24044698.
- Dagmar Triebel; Gregor Hagedorn; Gerhard Rambold (2012). "An appraisal of megascience platforms for biodiversity information". MycoKeys (5). MycoKeys 5: 45–63. Bibcode:2012MycoK...5...45T. doi:10.3897/mycokeys.5.4302.
- Jutta Gabler; Gregor Hagedorn; Uwe Braun (2012). "Taxonomy and phylogenetic placement of the downy mildew Peronospora saturejae-hortensis". Mycotaxon. 121. Mycotaxon Volume 121: 455–463. doi:10.5248/121.455.
- Hagedorn, Gregor (2012). Offene Naturführer – wie eine e-Flora entsteht Floras Schätze (in German). Botanisches Museum Berlin-Dahlem. ISBN 978-3-921800-70-6.
- Markus Scholler; Matthias Lutz; Alan R. Wood; Gregor Hagedorn & Mechthilde Mennicken (2011). Taxonomy and phylogeny of Puccinia lagenophorae: a study using rDNA sequence data, morphological and host range features. Mycological Progress volume 10.
- Konrad Förstner; Gregor Hagedorn; Claudia Koltzenburg; M. Fabiana Kubke & Daniel Mietchen (2011). "Collaborative platforms for streamlining workflows in Open Science". Nature Precedings: 1. doi:10.1038/npre.2011.6066.1.
- Gregor Hagedorn; Daniel Mietchen; Robert A. Morris; Donat Agosti; Lyubomir Penev; Walter G. Berendsohn; Donald Hobern (2011). "Creative Commons licenses and the non-commercial condition: Implications for the re-use of biodiversity information". ZooKeys (150). ZooKeys 150: 127–149. Bibcode:2011ZooK..150..127H. doi:10.3897/zookeys.150.2189. PMC 3234435. PMID 22207810.
- Lyubomir Penev; Gregor Hagedorn; Daniel Mietchen; Teodor Georgiev; Pavel Stoev; Guido Sautter; Donat Agosti; Andreas Plank; Michael Balke; Lars Hendrich; Terry Erwin (2011). "Interlinking journal and wiki publications through joint citation: Working examples from ZooKeys and Plazi on Species-ID". ZooKeys (90). ZooKeys 90: 1–12. Bibcode:2011ZooK...90....1P. doi:10.3897/zookeys.90.1369. PMC 3084489. PMID 21594104.
- Markus Scholler; Matthias Lutz; Alan R. Wood; Gregor Hagedorn & Mechthilde Mennicken (2010). "Taxonomy and phylogeny of Puccinia lagenophorae: a study using rDNA sequence data, morphological and host range features". Mycological Progress. 10 (2). Mycological Progress volume 10: 175–187. doi:10.1007/s11557-010-0687-0. S2CID 21268525.
- Yuko Ota; Tsutomu Hattori; Mark T.Banik; Gregor Hagedorn; Kozue Sotome; Sawako Tokuda; Yasuhisa Abe (2009). "The genus Laetiporus (Basidiomycota, Polyporales) in East Asia". Mycological Research. 113 (11). Mycological Research Volume 113: 1283–1300. doi:10.1016/j.mycres.2009.08.014. PMID 19769929.
- Hagedorn, Gregor (2007). Structuring Descriptive Data of Organisms — Requirement Analysis and Information Models (Doctoral thesis). Uni Bayreuth.
- Hagedorn, Gregor (2006). Zur Verbreitung von Erysiphales (Echten Mehltaupilzen) in Deutschland (in German). Mitteilungen aus der Biologischen Bundesanstalt für Land- und Forstwirtschaft Berlin Dahlem Nr. 406.
- Hagedorn, Gregor (2006). Zur Verbreitung von Peronosporales (inkl. Albugo, ohne Phytophthora) in Deutschland (in German). Mitteilungen aus der Biologischen Bundesanstalt für Land- und Forstwirtschaft Berlin Dahlem Nr. 405.
- Helgard I. Nirenberg; Uta Feiler & Gregor Hagedorn (2002). "Description of Colletotrichum lupini comb. nov. in Modern Terms". Mycologia. 94 (2). Mycologia Vol.94 No.2: 307–320. doi:10.1080/15572536.2003.11833238. JSTOR 3761809. PMID 21156502. S2CID 23010222.
- Walter G. Berendsohn; Anastasios Anagnostopoulos; Gregor Hagedorn; Jasmin Jakupovic; Pier Luigi Nimis; Benito Valdés; Anton Güntschl; Richard J. Pank-hurst; Richard J. White (1999). "A comprehensive reference model for biological collections and surveys". Taxon. 48 (3). TAXON, 48: 511–562. Bibcode:1999Taxon..48..511B. doi:10.2307/1224564. JSTOR 1224564.
- Rambold, Gerhard; Hagedorn, Gregor (1998). "The Distribution of Selected Diagnostic Characters in the Lecanorales". The Lichenologist. 30 (4–5). The Lichenologist Volume 30, Issue 4-5: 473–487. Bibcode:1998ThLic..30..473R. doi:10.1006/lich.1998.0153. S2CID 86810184.
