= Trevor Platt =

British and Canadian marine scientist

Trevor Platt FRS, FRSC
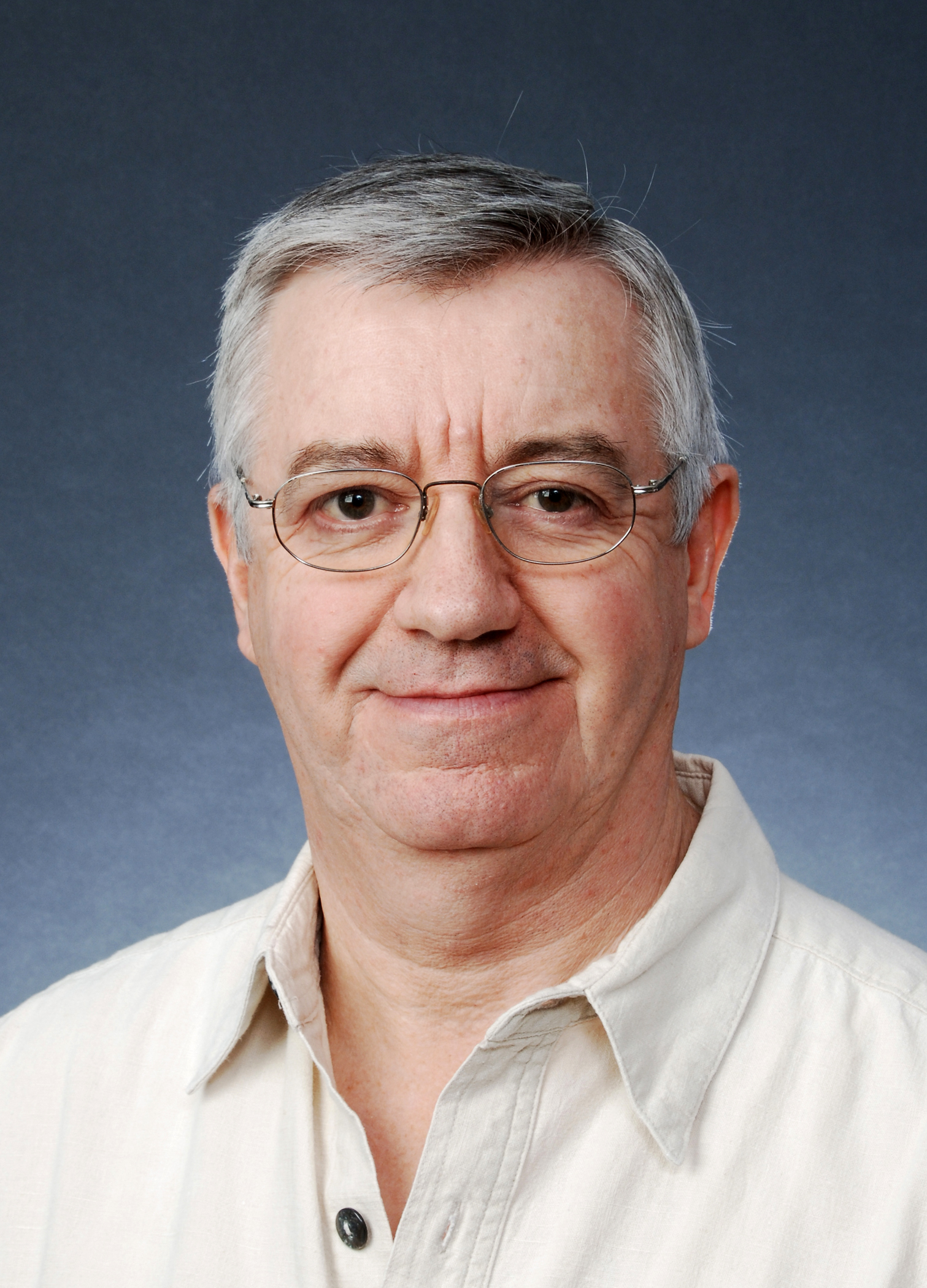
- Born: August 12, 1942; Salford, UK
- Died: April 6, 2020 (aged 77); Plymouth, UK
- Education: Dalhousie University
- Known for: Mathematical formulation of the relationship between photosynthesis and light for phytoplankton (P-I curve)
- Spouse: Shubha Sathyendranath
- Awards: G. Evelyn Hutchinson Award, A.G. Huntsman Award
- Scientific career
- Fields: Oceanography
- Workplaces: Bedford Institute of Oceanography, Plymouth Marine Laboratory

Trevor Charles Platt FRS FRSC (August 12, 1942 - April 6, 2020) was a British and Canadian biological oceanographer who was distinguished for his fundamental contributions to quantifying primary production by phytoplankton at various scales of space and time in the ocean.

== Early life and education ==
Platt was born in Salford, England in 1942 and received his BSc at the University of Nottingham, UK. He received his MA in 1965 from the University of Toronto, Canada for his thesis “Computer analysis of beam handling system for a linear accelerator”. Later in the same year, Platt started work at the Bedford Institute of Oceanography in Dartmouth, Nova Scotia. With the benefit of field and laboratory work conducted by his technical assistant Brian Irwin, who joined the institute in 1966, Platt embarked on studies that led to the fulfillment in 1970 of his PhD thesis (“Some effects of spatial and temporal heterogeneity on phytoplankton productivity”) at Dalhousie University.

== Research ==
Platt's early research was framed by the overarching goals originally envisioned by the founders of the Atlantic Oceanographic Group of the Fisheries Research Board of Canada at the Bedford Institute of Oceanography, namely: “to describe pathways and to measure amounts and rates of energy transfer in marine biological communities; and to study the structure and degree of organization of biological systems in the sea”. One such early collaborative work concerning energy flow and species diversity in marine phytoplankton blooms was motivated by the ideas of Ramon Margalef, who evidently was nominated by Platt in a later year to receive one of three inaugural medals of the A.G. Huntsman Award for Excellence in the Marine Sciences.

In the ensuing years, Platt, with collaborators, undertook a research program that progressed from investigations of the spatial inhomogeneity of plankton distribution in response to the power spectrum of turbulence, through the physiological responses of the growth of cells in response to light and nutrients, to dimensional analysis and the size structure of pelagic food chains, further to theoretical considerations of the limits of biological production in the ocean, and eventually to the effects of climate change and variability on the biological cycle in the ocean.

By the late 1980s, Platt's research program at the Bedford Institute of Oceanography had reached a stage where the solid foundations built from a close relationship between theoretical developments and observations at sea provided the ready capabilities to embrace the possibilities offered by satellite remote sensing of the ocean. With his close collaborator Shubha Sathyendranath, Platt successfully implemented the analytical solutions and measurement-driven algorithms at regional and ocean basin scales to compute integrated primary production through the water column. In 1995, the long-sought calculation of annual global production by marine phytoplankton was made possible for the first time, after Alan Longhurst successfully partitioned the global ocean into a set of biogeochemical provinces within which the phytoplankton are likely subject to common physical forcing.

In later years after the estimation of marine primary production at large geographical scale was made operational, Platt increasingly turned his attention to the use of remotely-sensed ocean colour as indicators of ecosystem performance towards the management of fisheries and stewardship of the ocean.

== Career ==
Platt joined the Fisheries Research Board of Canada at the then three year old Bedford Institute of Oceanography in Dartmouth, Nova Scotia on June 22, 1965 as a research scientist in the public service. In 1972, he took over from Kenneth H. Mann as head of the Biological Oceanography Section. He served as head until 2000, after which he remained in the section as senior research scientist. In 2005, he transferred to the Coastal Ocean Science Section, still at the Bedford Institute of Oceanography, and remained there until his departure in 2008. Platt was appointed Professorial Fellow at the Plymouth Marine Laboratory (UK) in 2008, and Jawaharlal Nehru Science Fellow at the Central Marine Fisheries Research Institute (India) in 2014.

Platt served the Association for the Sciences of Limnology and Oceanography (ASLO) for two separate terms as a member-at-large (1974-1977, 1986-1989), then as President (1990-1992).

Platt played an especially important role in the International Ocean Colour Coordinating Group (IOCCG), being one of the founding members of the group, and served as the first Chairman of the IOCCG for a period of 10 years (from 1996-2006).

Platt also had a long association with the Partnership for Observation of the Global Ocean (POGO), first as a visiting Professor in 2005, and then as its Executive Director from 2008 to 2015.

== Awards and honours ==
- 1981 APICS-Fraser Gold Medal
- 1984 Rosenstiel Award
- 1988 G. Evelyn Hutchinson Award, American Society for Limnology and Oceanography
- 1990 Fellow of the Royal Society of Canada
- 1992 A.G. Huntsman Award for Excellence in the Marine Sciences
- 1998 Fellow of the Royal Society
- 2006 Timothy R. Parsons Medal
- 2007 DFO Prix d’Excellence
- 2014 Jawaharlal Nehru Science Fellowship
