= Uta Passow =

Marine scientist

- Education: Inst. für Meereskunde, Abt. Marine Planktologie, Kiel
- Scientific career
- Thesis: Vertikalverteilung und Sedimentation von Phytoplanktonarten in der mittleren Ostsee während des Frühjahres 1986 (1990)

Uta Passow is a marine scientist known for her work on the biological carbon pump. She is a Canadian Research Chair at the Memorial University of Newfoundland, and the 2022 recipient of the A.G. Huntsman Award for Excellence in the Marine Sciences.

== Education and career ==
Passow has a bachelor's degree in biology and chemistry from University of Freiburg. Passow received her diplom (1985) and Ph.D. (1989) from Kiel University. She then moved to the University of California, Santa Barbara where she remained until 2000 when she moved to the Alfred Wegener Institute for Polar and Marine Research. In 2001 she received her habilitation, and became a full professor. In 2008 she moved back to the University of California, Santa Barbara where she remained until 2018 when she became a Canada Research Chair at Memorial University of Newfoundland, Canada.

== Research ==
Passow's early research examined the spring bloom and the abundance of organic particles in the ocean. She developed a means to use dyes to quantify transparent exopolymer particles and went on to define the processes forming these particles. Passow also examined carbon cycling in the aftermath of the Deepwater Horizon oil spill.

== Selected publications ==
- Passow, U. (2002-11-01). "Transparent exopolymer particles (TEP) in aquatic environments". Progress in Oceanography. 55 (3): 287–333. Bibcode:2002PrOce..55..287P. doi:10.1016/S0079-6611(02)00138-6. ISSN 0079-6611.
- Alldredge, Alice L.; Passow, Uta; Logan, Bruce E. (1993-06-01). "The abundance and significance of a class of large, transparent organic particles in the ocean". Deep Sea Research Part I: Oceanographic Research Papers. 40 (6): 1131–1140. Bibcode:1993DSRI...40.1131A. doi:10.1016/0967-0637(93)90129-Q. ISSN 0967-0637.
- Passow, U.; Alldredge, A. L. (1995). "A dye-binding assay for the spectrophotometric measurement of transparent exopolymer particles (TEP)". Limnology and Oceanography. 40 (7): 1326–1335. Bibcode:1995LimOc..40.1326P. doi:10.4319/lo.1995.40.7.1326. ISSN 0024-3590.
- Passow, Uta; Alldredge, Alice L.; Logan, Bruce E. (1994-02-01). "The role of particulate carbohydrate exudates in the flocculation of diatom blooms". Deep Sea Research Part I: Oceanographic Research Papers. 41 (2): 335–357. Bibcode:1994DSRI...41..335P. doi:10.1016/0967-0637(94)90007-8. ISSN 0967-0637.

== Awards and honors ==
In 2022 Passow received the A.G. Huntsman Award for Excellence in the Marine Sciences.
