= National Center for Ecological Analysis and Synthesis =

US research center

Coordinates: 34.41920°N 119.69937°W

The National Center for Ecological Analysis and Synthesis (NCEAS) is a research center at the University of California, Santa Barbara, in Santa Barbara, California. Better known by its acronym, NCEAS (pronounced “n-seas”) opened in May 1995. Funding for NCEAS is diverse and includes supporters such as the U.S. National Science Foundation, the State of California, and the University of California, Santa Barbara.

NCEAS supports cross-disciplinary research that analyzes and synthesizes existing data to address major fundamental issues in ecology and allied fields, and encourages the application of science to natural resource management and public policy decision making. To facilitate synthetic analysis, NCEAS advances new techniques in mathematical and geospatial modeling, dynamic simulation, and visualization of ecological systems through its Ecoinformatics program. Since its inception, the Center has hosted over 5,000 individuals and supported roughly 500 research projects, which have resulted in more than 2,000 publications in 300+ different journals. In addition, NCEAS engages graduate students and grade school children through a variety of outreach and education programs.

== Mission ==
NCEAS’ core mission is to foster synthesis and analysis, and promote effective collaboration among researchers to alter how science is conducted. This mission includes 3 goals:

- Advance the state of ecological knowledge through the search for general patterns and principles in existing data
- Organize and synthesize ecological information in a manner useful to researchers, resource managers, and policy makers addressing important environmental issues
- Influence the way ecological research is conducted by promoting a culture of synthesis, collaboration and data sharing

== Research programs ==
Research at NCEAS focuses on three key areas: Core Ecology, Ecoinformatics, and Conservation and Resource Management.

- Core Ecology - the primary research area funded by NCEAS, which includes a broad range of topics in ecology and allied fields.
- Ecoinformatics – research dedicated to the development and dissemination of technological tools that facilitate analysis and synthesis in ecology.
- Conservation and Resource Management – research focused on areas such as conservation biology and the explicit application of science to natural resource management and policy decision making.

== Supported research ==
NCEAS supports four main research activities focused on synthesizing existing data:

- Working groups - 4 to 20 cross-disciplinary individuals periodically meet at the Center and work together on a specific collaborative research project.
- Postdoctoral researchers - early-career scientists who reside at NCEAS for 2–3 years to carry out synthetic research.
- Center fellows – researchers on sabbatical from their home institutions who reside at the Center to focus on a research topic within NCEAS' scope.
- Distributed graduate seminars – seminars that enable students and faculty from nationally or globally distributed universities to remotely collaborate on a research project.

NCEAS research is funded primarily through a competitive review process. Whether collaborative groups or individuals, scientists submit a proposal with research objectives, and the NCEAS Science Advisory Board determines which merit support.

== Education and outreach ==
In addition to its research activities, NCEAS carries out a number of outreach initiatives to increase public understanding of science, to foster interest in ecology and technology professions (particularly among groups underrepresented in science) and to engage with the local community. NCEAS also offers education and training programs at all levels of sophistication, from elementary school through undergraduate and graduate studies, to continuing education of professional scientists.

One notable outreach and education program at NCEAS is Kids Do Ecology, which engages elementary-age children in the science of ecology. The program consists of two parts: a bilingual website and classroom projects, in which NCEAS scientists work with students in local classrooms to carry out ecological experiments based on the scientific method.

== History and funding ==
The origin of the center can be traced to the perception among ecologists that important research themes span wide regions and long time periods. For example, research on marine fisheries must consider information from wide stretches of the ocean, and studies of long-lived forest communities must span decades. Recognizing that research in such areas cannot be accomplished by a single scientist working at one location, the National Science Foundation (NSF) recognized the need for a center whose mission was to foster synthetic research using existing data. In 1994, the NSF solicited proposals to build such a center, and the University of California, Santa Barbara was awarded $10.4 million to establish and operate the center for five years. Subsequent grants were awarded to UC Santa Barbara to continue NCEAS in 2000 ($16.6 million) and 2006 ($18.5 million).

By 2005, ISI Essential Science Indicators recognized that NCEAS ranked #22 out of 38,000 institutions worldwide publishing in ecology and environmental science, in terms of scientific impact. Based on the experience with NCEAS, NSF launched a wider program of synthesis centers, including the National Evolutionary Synthesis Center (NESCent) and National Institute for Mathematical and Biological Synthesis (NIMBioS). Similar efforts based on the NCEAS research approach have been undertaken internationally as well, such as the Australian Center for Ecological Analysis and Synthesis (ACEAS) and the Canadian Institute of Ecology and Evolution. In all, more than 18 centers have been modeled on the NCEAS approach.

Additional support, in particular funds directed toward the Conservation and Resource Management program, comes from federal and state agencies, private foundations, and non-governmental organizations.

== NCEAS Directors ==
William W. Murdoch initially served as the NCEAS director, followed by O.J. Reichman who directed the center from 1997 to 2007. Murdoch then returned to NCEAS as interim director until the arrival of Ed McCauley on January 1, 2010.

On May 11, 2011, it was announced that McCauley had been appointed vice president (research) at the University of Calgary, effective July 1, 2011, and he was replaced by Frank Davis at that time. Davis, who formerly served as NCEAS' Deputy Director from 1995-1999, served as NCEAS' Director through June 2016. Ben Halpern took over as director of NCEAS, effective July 1, 2016.

== Resident scientists and NCEAS staff ==
NCEAS employs approximately 20 full- and part-time staff, as well as graduate and undergraduate interns. There are also a number of postdoctoral researchers and sabbatical fellows in residence at the Center at any given time.

== Location and facilities ==
NCEAS is located in the Balboa Building of Paseo Nuevo in the center of downtown Santa Barbara. The Center offers computing infrastructure, meeting rooms for small groups and two larger rooms which accommodate 18 and 25 people, as well as access to several larger conference facilities. A large lounge and kitchen are available for breaks, informal seminars and gatherings. The Center also includes a variety of offices that house resident and visiting researchers and in-house staff.
