= Jaia Syvitski =

American-Canadian Professor Emeritus

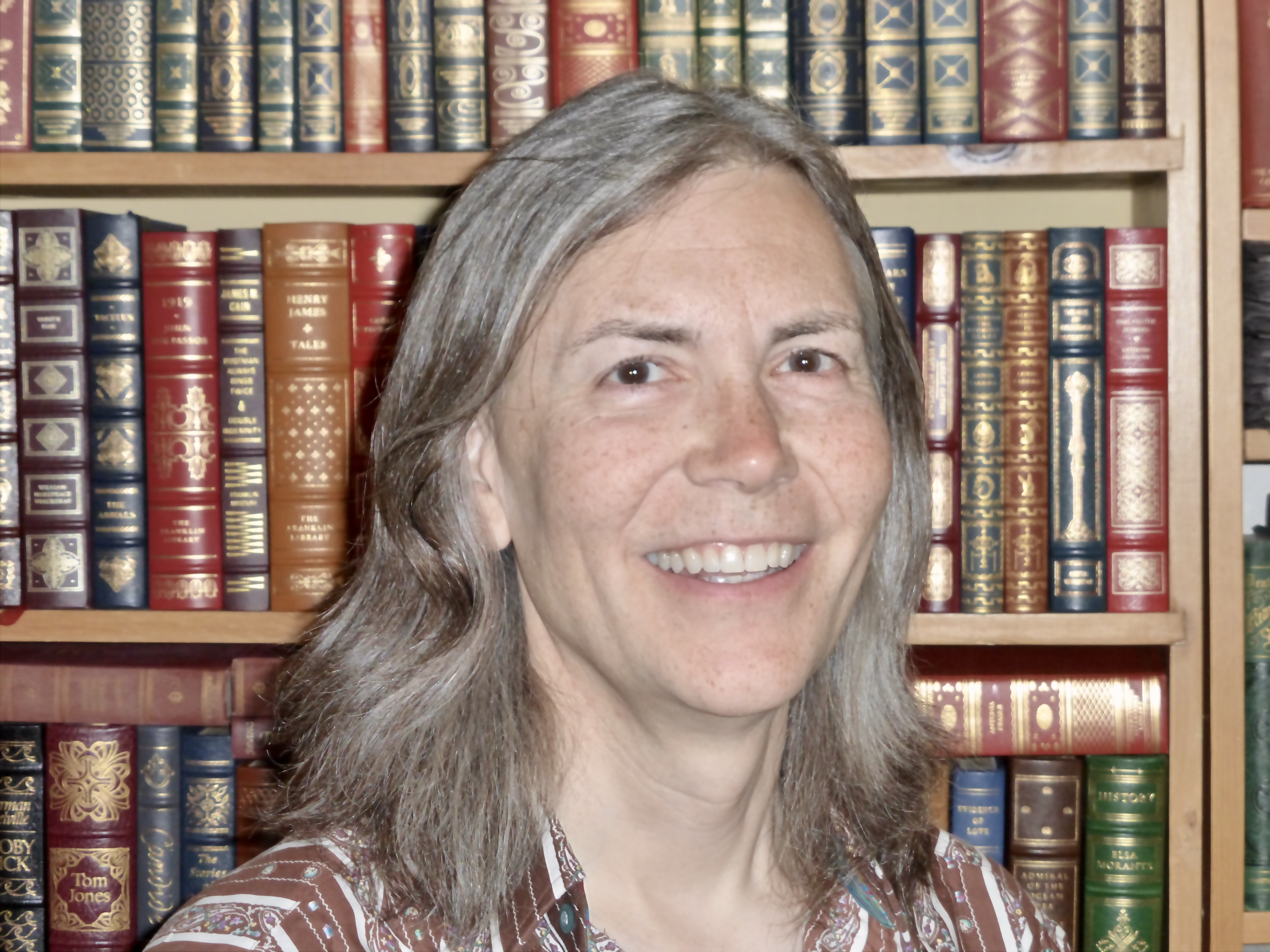
- Citizenship: United States & Canadian
- Education: Lakehead University, University of British Columbia
- Known for: Computational geosciences, sediment transport, land-ocean interactions, earth-surface dynamics
- Awards: Royal Society of Canada, Huntsman Medal for Outstanding Achievements in Marine Science, 2009 50th Anniversary BIO Crystal Award, 2012 SEPM (Society for Sedimentary Geology) Francis P Shepard Medal, for outstanding contribution to Marine Geology, 2016 NSF-CSDMS Lifetime Achievement Award, 2019 G.K. Gilbert award for excellence in geomorphological research, Assoc. of American Geomorphologists, 2023
- Scientific career
- Fields: Oceanography, geological sciences, hydrology, numerical modeling, geophysics
- Workplaces: University of Calgary, Bedford Institute of Oceanography, University of Colorado
- Thesis: Sedimentological Advances Concerning the Flocculation and Zooplankton Pelletization of Suspended Sediment in Howe Sound, British Columbia: A Fjord Receiving Glacial Meltwater (1978)

Jaia Syvitski is an American-Canadian earth system scientist and Professor Emerita. Her areas of research include oceanography, geology, hydrology, numerical modelling, and geophysics.

== Career ==
Syvitski obtained a Bachelor of Science degree in geology and mathematics in 1974, and an Honours degree in geology in 1975 from Lakehead University. In 1978, she received a PhD from the University of British Columbia in oceanography and geology.

After graduation, Syvitski became an assistant professor at the University of Calgary. In 1981, she moved to Halifax, Nova Scotia, to work as a senior research scientist for the Bedford Institute of Oceanography with the Canadian Federal Department Natural Resources Canada. During that period Syvitski received appointments as adjunct professor at Canadian Universities: Dalhousie, Laval Universities, Memorial University of Newfoundland and the Institut national de la recherche scientifique of Quebec.

From 1995-2007 Syvitski was director of the Institute of Arctic and Alpine Research at the University of Colorado, where she was also awarded professorships in geological sciences and geophysics. In 2007, Syvitski became Executive Director of the Community Surface Dynamics Modeling System and Professor of Oceanography, and in 2009 she was also appointed Professor of Applied Math.

Syvitski served as chair of the International Geosphere-Biosphere Programme for the International Council for Science from 2011-2016. During this time (2013-2015) Syvitski was also part of the advisory council in the department of oceanography at Xiamen University, and from 2013 she was an International Development Advisor for the International Development Research Centre and Department for International Development.

Syvitski retired in 2018. She has written over 500 publications, including peer-reviewed and popular articles and books.

== Awards and honours ==
Year	Organisation	Award / honour
2009	Royal Society of Canada	A.G. Huntsman Award for Excellence in the Marine Sciences
2010	Fellow	American Geophysical Union

== Personal life ==
Syvitski is non-binary and genderqueer, and uses she/her pronouns. She came out publicly around 2005.

Outside of work, Syvitski enjoys guitar, meditation, tai chi, gardening, and literature.
