= Miriam Kastner =

American oceanographer and geochemist (born 1935)

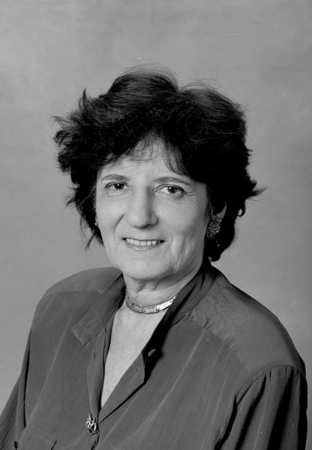
- Born: January 22, 1935; Bratislava, Slovakia
- Education: Hebrew University of Jerusalem; Harvard University
- Spouse: Yaakov Ben-Tor (1910-2002)
- Scientific career
- Fields: Oceanography, Geology, Geochemistry
- Institutions: Scripps Institution of Oceanography

Miriam Kastner (born January 22, 1935) is a Bratislavan born, (former Czechoslovakia) Israeli raised, American oceanographer and geochemist. Kastner is currently a distinguished professor at Scripps Institution of Oceanography at the University of California, San Diego. She is still recognized by her fundamental contributions to science and is well spoken of amongst colleagues.

== Education ==
Miriam Kastner enjoyed the sciences since she was a child and originally wanted to be a mathematician, however she later decided down the road that, math was not the career for her as there were far fewer careers to pursue in mathematics. Early on Miriam noticed that not many women were scientists, which inspired her to research different sciences.

Kastner attended the Hebrew University of Jerusalem in 1964, where she received a minor in chemistry and a master's degree in geology. After graduation, she wrote her first formal paper about the hydrothermal systems of the Guaymas Basin, in the Gulf of California. Kastner attendedHarvard University, Boston, in 1970, where she was exposed to oceanography and later received her doctorate in geoscience. For three years, Kastner was the only woman in her department while studying at Harvard. Thus, women were not taken very seriously by other faculty members resulting in a discouraging environment. Faculty members also expected less from their female students and counterparts, although there were some who supported Kastner and fellow female academics, such as the Ph.D. committee.

== Career ==
Over the course of her career, Kastner progressed from being an associate professor, to a professor, and is now a distinguished professor at the Scripps Institution of Oceanography, where she participated in writing and publishing 174 articles and journals. Kastner has worked with the Scripps Institution from 1972 till present. Kastner became the second female professor at the Scripps Institute, only two months after the first geophysicist had joined the faculty; this paved the way for many female scientists at the time and in the future. Prior to teaching at Scripps Institution, Kastner worked as a research associate at Harvard University in the department of geological sciences until 1970. In 1971 she worked at the University of Chicago as a research associate in the Department of Geophysical Sciences. Some believe she has accomplished more work than anyone else among the marine geology community and her publications contain high quality data and ideas that show consistency in addressing the big issues in Earth sciences. Miriam Kastner's research is primarily based in mineralogy and petrology, though the most important issue pursued in her career is fluid flow at subducting plate boundaries.

Kastner from the SIO (Scripps Institution of Oceanography) situated in La Jolla, California, demonstrated that we didn't know of the existence of subsea hydrothermal vents until the 1980s. To illustrate the vast scale of these processes, she explained that the entire volume of the ocean circulates through hydrothermal systems about once every five million years, and through global subduction zones approximately once every 200 million years, linking seafloor processes directly to the long-term evolution of the Earth system.

Throughout her long and successful career, Miriam Kastner produced dozens of publications highlighting her key research. Her first publication, dating back to 1965, examined the mineral glauconite and documented its properties. Over the next 15 or so years her research focused more on the analysis of deep sea sedimentation. For the next 20 years of her career she continued her research on deep sea sedimentation but her focus shifted more to hydrogeology and fluid dynamics and the effect of this sedimentation and mineral deposits. In recent years, she has examined isotopes and their concentrations in oceans. Most recently, Miriam has compiled a brief synopsis of her ocean drilling work over the past 50 years.

=== Academic roles ===
Along with being a professor, Kastner has served many roles at Scripps Institution of Oceanography, including chair and vice chair of the faculty, associate director and director in the geosciences research division, chair of Academic Senate Committee on Research, as well as curricular group coordinator of geological sciences. From 2003 to 2005, she served on the National Research Council's Ocean Studies Board. As a female in a once male dominated profession, Kastner expressed that it was difficult to garner support from science-related funding agencies. She was glad to see recent improvement on the increase of women pursuing science related degrees, however she believes there is still room for improvement, despite roughly 50% of women being in a science program, but only approximately 20% are field researchers in the institutes. Young women should have more confidence when applying for field research positions, as support for women in the sciences has improved drastically in comparison to her earlier years.

=== Early career achievements ===
Much of what Kastner has achieved came from the earlier part of her career when she put her talents to work and directed her focus on the origin of authigenic feldspars, she also focused on zeolites in the oceanic sediments during that time. Delving deeper into the significance of Kastner's work, her first publication named “Notes on the mineralogy and origin of glauconite” documents her findings on the properties and classification of glauconite. Although there were others with documented observations of glauconite the results varied greatly and Kastner was the first to point out that these studies are largely flawed due to the failure to take into account the large deposits of non-structural iron oxides which would ultimately skew the results. With the oceanic sediments she determined that the diagenetic transformations of opal-A to opal-CT and quartz is important to the formation of siliceous marine deposits. Kastner also found that dolomite formation is ultimately controlled by its associated pore-fluid geochemistry. The discovery solved an outstanding problem in carbonate mineral science. Kastner's measurements of the Sr distribution coefficient was critical in building strontium concentrations in calcite, which was ultimately used for paleoclimate studies that are dependent on carbonate Sr proxies, the discovery also was used for indicating carbonate recrystallization. Kastner also worked vigorously on phosphate deposits, her work included a revision of the stability of P-O bonds in apatite and phosphate ions, after the revision there was a recalculation of the ocean residence time of phosphorus. Her research focuses on the geochemistry of fluid work interactions, mostly with ocean chemistry. This encompasses the significance to marine minerals, to gain knowledge and understanding of how the Earth works. Gas hydrate research has interested Kastner and many fellow geo-scientists due to both its possible contribution to global warming, and as a potential energy source provided as a result of the amount of methane found in these oceanic hydrates. By studying these marine events, Kastner has stated that this can allow for people to be better prepared to predict global warming and have the possibility of avoiding sudden climatic response to anthropogenic perturbations.

== Key research ==
Kastner's area of research is “mostly geochemistry on fluid–rock interactions", specifically with seawater. Her research expertise is on the fluctuation of fluids at plate boundaries, specifically where two plates meet to cause earthquakes and at ridge-crests where hypothermal deposits are found. She has authored over 80 scientific articles. Kastner's work is based on numerous studies, including the following:

- Long-term monitoring in observatories of marine gas hydrates and implications for climate change, slope stability, and ocean chemistry
- On the oceanic contribution of methane to the atmosphere
- Chemical paleoceanography: establishing new marine phases based on the ocean's geological history.
- Sediment, geochemical and diagenetic processes with emphasis on marine authigenic minerals like phosphates, silicates, carbonates

One of Kastner's most important publications is one of her most recent “50 years of scientific drilling”. This article is particularly significant as it highlights some of her major findings over the last 50 years. This paper does well to review drilling projects as well as highlight major scientific achievements of the work. The major drilling projects mentioned in the article are as follows, the Mohole Project, Joides and the Deep Sea Drilling Project, the Ocean Drilling Program, and the Integrated Ocean Drilling Program and International Ocean Discovery Program. Each of these projects have made significant contributions to the field of geology. The Mohole Project was famous for recovering large deposits of subseafloor basalt, the Joides and the Deep Sea Drilling Project was known for being one of the first to identify and record the sedimentary rock layering of our ocean floors, and the Integrated Ocean Drilling Program and International Ocean Discovery Program made findings that helped shape the education system of undergraduates as well as in grades K-12. Some of the major achievements of scientific ocean drilling are listed below:

- Helped set the standard for the geological time scale by refining the geomagnetic time scale and how it relates to astronomical chronologies
- Helped link long term climate changes to Earth's orbital variability
- Proved that Antarctica was largely iceless approximately 40 million years ago
- Discovered the most complete marine records of the Cretaceous/Paleogene mass extinction and potential evidence linking the extinction event to a large asteroid
- Provided early evidence of the theory of plate tectonics
- Provided the first evidence of the age dependent growth of the oceanic lithosphere
- Accurately narrowed down the age of the Earth based on sedimentary record

This is not a complete list.

== Getty kouros test ==
In the early 1990s, Kastner produced an experimental result which cast doubt on a thesis about dolomite leaching in dating the Getty kouros statue at the centre of a forgery claim. By artificially inducing de-dolomitization in the laboratory, a she produced a result since confirmed by Stanley Margolis a geology professor at the University of California at Davis who had previously determined that this process could occur only over the course of many centuries making forgery unlikely.

== Publications ==
Kastner has published many articles, here is a partial list:

- 1965- Y. K. Bentor, Miriam Kastner. Notes on the Mineralogy and Origin of Glauconite. SEPM Journal of Sedimentary Research (1965), Vol. 35
- 1972- Siever R, Kastner M. Shale petrology by electron microprobe; pyrite-chloride relations. Journal of Sedimentary Research (1972), 42(2):350-355
- 1977- Kastner M, Keene JB, Gieskes JM. Diagenesis of siliceous oozes-I. Chemical controls on the rate of opal-A to opal-CT transformation-an experimental study Geochimica Et Cosmochimica Acta. 41: 1041-1051,1053-1059.
- 1980- Lonsdale PF, Bischoff JL, Burns VM, Kastner M, Sweeney RE. A high-temperature hydrothermal deposit on the seabed at a gulf of California spreading center Earth and Planetary Science Letters. 49: 8-20
- 1980- Einsele G, Gieskes JM, Curray J, Moore DM, Aguayo E, Aubry MP, Fornari D, Guerrero J, Kastner M, Kelts K, Lyle M, Matoba Y, Molina-Cruz A, Niemitz J, Rueda J, et al. Intrusion of basaltic sills into highly porous sediments, and resulting hydrothermal activity Nature. 283: 441-445.
- 1980- Spiess FN, Macdonald KC, Atwater T, Ballard R, Carranza A, Cordoba D, Cox C, Garcia VM, Francheteau J, Guerrero J, Hawkins J, Haymon R, Hessler R, Juteau T, Kastner M, et al. East pacific rise: hot springs and geophysical experiments. Science. 207: 1421-33.
- 1981- Kastner M, Siever R. Low temperature feldspars in sedimentary rocks American Journal of Science. 279: 435-4Haymon RM, Kastner M. Hot spring deposits on the East Pacific Rise at 21°N: preliminary description of mineralogy and genesis Earth and Planetary Science Letters. 53: 363-381. 79
- 1981- Baker PA, Kastner M. Constraints on the formation of sedimentary dolomite. Science. 213: 214-6.
- 1983- Kastner M, Siever R. Siliceous sediments of the Guaymas Basin: the effect of high thermal gradients on diagenesis. Journal of Geology.
- 1986- Kastner M, Gieskes JM, Hu JY. Carbonate recrystallization in basal sediments: Evidence for convective fluid flow on a ridge flank Nature. 321: 158-161.
- 1990- Garrison RE, Kastner M. Phosphatic sediments and rocks recovered from the Peru margin during ODP Leg 112 Proc., Scientific Reports, Odp, Leg 112, Peru Continental Margin.
- 1991- Martin JB, Kastner M, Elderfield H. Lithium: sources in pore fluids of Peru slope sediments and implications for oceanic fluxes Marine Geology. 102: 281-292.
- 1993- Martin JB, Gieskes JM, Torres M, Kastner M. Bromine and iodine in Peru margin sediments and pore fluids: Implications for fluid origins Geochimica Et Cosmochimica Acta. 57: 4377-4389.
- 1995- Martin EE, Macdougall JD, Herbert TD, Paytan A, Kastner M. Strontium and neodymium isotopic analyses of marine barite separates Geochimica Et Cosmochimica Acta. 59: 1353-1361.
- 1996- Paytan A, Kastner M, Chavez FP. Glacial to Interglacial Fluctuations in Productivity in the Equatorial Pacific as Indicated by Marine Barite Science. 274: 1355-7.
- 1998- Ransom B, Kim D, Kastner M, Wainwright S. Organic matter preservation on continental slopes: importance of mineralogy and surface area Geochimica Et Cosmochimica Acta. 62: 1329-1345.
- 1998- Paytan A, Kastner M, Campbell D, Thiemens MH. Sulfur isotopic composition of cenozoic seawater sulfate Science. 282: 1459-62.
- 2001- Valentine DL, Blanton DC, Reeburgh WS, Kastner M. Water column methane oxidation adjacent to an area of active hydrate dissociation, Eel River Basin Geochimica Et Cosmochimica Acta. 65: 2633-2640.
- 2008- Newman KR, Cormier MH, Weissel JK, Driscoll NW, Kastner M, Solomon EA, Robertson G, Hill JC, Singh H, Camilli R, Eustice R. Active methane venting observed at giant pockmarks along the U.S. mid-Atlantic shelf break Earth and Planetary Science Letters. 267: 341-352. DOI: 10.1016/J.Epsl.2007.11.053
- 2009- Solomon EA, Kastner M, Wheat CG, Jannasch H, Robertson G, Davis EE, Morris JD. Long-term hydrogeochemical records in the oceanic basement and forearc prism at the Costa Rica subduction zone Earth and Planetary Science Letters. 282: 240-251. DOI: 10.1016/J.Epsl.2009.03.022
- 2011- Joye SB, Leifer I, MacDonald IR, Chanton JP, Meile CD, Teske AP, Kostka JE, Chistoserdova L, Coffin R, Hollander D, Kastner M, Montoya JP, Rehder G, Solomon E, Treude T, et al. Comment on "A persistent oxygen anomaly reveals the fate of spilled methane in the deep Gulf of Mexico". Science. 332: 1033; author reply 1.
- 2012- Solomon EA, Kastner M. Progressive barite dissolution in the Costa Rica forearc - Implications for global fluxes of Ba to the volcanic arc and mantle Geochimica Et Cosmochimica Acta. 83: 110-124. DOI: 10.1016/J.Gca.2011.12.021
- 2019- Martinez-Ruiz F, Paytan A, Gonzalez-Muñoz M, Jroundi F, Abad M, Lam P, Bishop J, Horner T, Morton P, Kastner M. Barite formation in the ocean: Origin of amorphous and crystalline precipitates Chemical Geology. 511: 441-451.

== Awards and honours ==
- Newcomb Cleveland prize, American Association for the Advancement of Science (1980)
- Guggenheim Fellow (1982)
- Charles R. Bennett Service through Chemistry Award, American Chemical Society (1984)
- Ocean Science Education Award, Office of Naval Research (1991)
- Fellow of John Simon Guggenheim Memorial Foundation (1992)
- Fellow, American Association for the Advancement of Science (1993)
- Fellow, American Geophysical Union (1997)
- Fellow, Geochemical Society and European Association of Geochemistry (1998)
- Hans Petterson Medal, Royal Swedish Academy of Sciences (1999)
- Fellow, Geological Society of America (2004)
- Maurice Ewing Medal, American Geophysical Union (2008)
- Fellow, International Association of GeoChemistry (2010)
- Francis Shepard Medal for Excellence in Marine Geology, Society for Sedimentary Geology (2011)
- V. M. Goldshmidt Award, Geochemical Society (2015)
- Leopold-von-Buch-Plakette, German Geological Society (2018)
