= Community Surface Dynamics Modeling System =

- Abbreviation: CSDMS
- Formation: 2007; 19 years ago
- Type: INGO
- Region served: Worldwide
- Official language: English
- Website: CSDMS official website

The Community Surface Dynamics Modeling System (CSDMS) deals with the Earth's surface and the observable and projected changes constantly taking place – the ever-changing dynamic interface between lithosphere, hydrosphere, cryosphere and atmosphere.

CSDMS supports the development, integration, dissemination and archiving of community open-source software, that reflects and predicts earth-surface processes over a broad range of temporal and spatial scales.

Over 500 research institutions from more than 65 countries comprise the community effort. CSDMS distributes hundreds of open-source models and modeling tools, provides access to high performance computing clusters in support of developing and running earth surface models, and offers a suite of products for education and knowledge transfer.

The CSDMS architecture employs frameworks and services that convert stand-alone models into flexible "plug-and-play" components to be assembled into larger applications. CSDMS focuses on the movement of fluids and the sediment and solutes they transport through landscapes, seascapes and sedimentary basins. Began in 2007 under the leadership of Jaia Syvitski, formerly the director of the Institute of Arctic and Alpine Research (INSTAAR), Boulder, CO, CSDMS operates under continuing funding from the National Science Foundation (NSF) to coordinate this national effort related to surface dynamic modeling.
