= Transparent exopolymer particles =

Transparent exopolymer particles (TEPs) are extracellular acidic polysaccharides produced by phytoplankton and bacteria in saltwater, freshwater, and wastewater. They are incredibly abundant and play a significant role in biogeochemical cycling of carbon and other elements in water. Through this, they also play a role in the structure of food webs and trophic levels. TEP production and overall concentration has been observed to be higher in the Pacific Ocean compared to the Atlantic, and is more related to solar radiation in the Pacific. TEP concentration has been found to decrease with depth, having the highest concentration at the surface, especially associated with the SML, either by upward flux or sea surface production. Chlorophyll a has been found to be the best indicator of TEP concentration, rather than heterotrophic grazing abundance, further emphasizing the role of phytoplankton in TEP production. TEP concentration is especially enhanced by haptophyte phytoplanktonic dominance, solar radiation exposure, and close proximity to sea ice. TEPs also do not seem to show any diel cycles. High concentrations of TEPs in the surface ocean slow the sinking of solid particle aggregations, prolonging pelagic residence time. TEPs may provide an upward flux of materials such as bacteria, phytoplankton, carbon, and trace nutrients. High TEP concentrations were found under arctic sea ice, probably released by sympagic algae. TEP is efficiently recycled in the ocean, as heterotrophic grazers such as zooplankton and protists consume TEP and produce new TEP precursors to be reused, further emphasizing the importance of TEPs in marine carbon cycling. TEP abundance tends to be higher in coastal, shallow waters compared to deeper, oceanic waters. Diatom-dominated phytoplankton colonies produce larger, and stickier, TEPs, which may indicate that TEP size distribution and composition may be a useful tool in determining aggregate planktonic community structure.

TEPs are formed from cell surface mucus sloughing, the disintegration of bacterial colonies, and precursors released by growing or senescent phytoplankton. TEP precursors can be fibrillar, forming larger colloids, or aggregations, and within hours to days after release from the cell are fully formed transparent exopolymer particles. While most exopolymeric substances range from loose slimes to tight shells surrounding cells, TEPs exist as individual particles, allowing them to aggregate and be collected by filtration. They are highly sticky, forming aggregations of solid particles known as marine snow, and are actually associated with all marine aggregations investigated thus far. TEPs have a high C:N ratio compared to the Redfield Ratio, suggesting the significance of TEPs in the promotion of carbon sequestration and particle sedimentation to the benthos, but this is complicated due to bacterial decomposition, as well as heterotrophic grazing by zooplankton such as euphausiids and protists. This also suggests that TEPs may represent a link between the oceanic microbial loop and other food webs, as well as creating short circuit food webs within the pelagic.

TEPs provide a surface within the pelagic ocean for bacterial colonies to form. The bacterial colonies associated with TEPs tend to be dominated by Alteromonadaceae, specifically taxonomic units previously associated with microgel habitats, Marinobacter and Glaciecola. A novel species of bacteria, Lentisphaera araneosa, was discovered colonizing TEPs off the coast of Oregon. Phytoplankton have been found to be the most significant source of TEP, but TEP abundance is also positively correlated with bacterial abundance. Bacteria either enhance the production of TEP by phytoplankton or contribute to the production of it. TEP presence is necessary for the sedimentation of diatoms, but are not involved in the sedimentation of foraminifera. Prochlorococcus sp. decay from increased solar radiation was found to promote TEP production, suggesting that picocyanobacteria are a source material for TEP. During a controlled diatom bloom, TEP concentrations saw exponential growth during bloom growth, flocculation, and senescence, but the production of TEP did not increase after nutrient depletion. In fact, TEP concentration was found to be a linear function of chlorophyll a and POC, suggesting that TEP production is linked to phytoplankton growth. The ratio of TEP to phytoplankton was a determining factor in bloom flocculation. During flocculation, TEP, due to its high stickiness, aggregated with itself and phytoplankton, but phytoplankton did not independently flocculate to themselves. Bacterial degradation may have contributed to TEP concentration loss.

The significance of TEPs in biogeochemical cycling and trophic cascading has always been suspected, but were not able to be accurately quantified until recently. Using light microscopy to quantitatively analyze TEP is a slow and tedious process. The use of Alcian blue to stain these otherwise transparent molecules has been beneficial in more efficiently analyzing them using spectrophotometry. TEPs have been referred to as ‘protobiofilms’ due to their intense colonization by bacteria, displaying many characteristics of a biofilm without being attached to a surface. Planktonic microgels, another term for TEPs, and their role as protobiofilms, may be of some significance to water and water treatment industries. TEPs may be useful in the desalination and water treatment industries through its contribution to biofouling mechanisms.
