= Scientists for Future =

International environmental initiative

- Scientists for Future
- Logo includes warming stripes graphic
- Abbreviation: S4F
- Formation: 2019; 7 years ago
- Type: Environmental
- Website: scientists4future.org (U.S.) scientists4future.org (Germany)

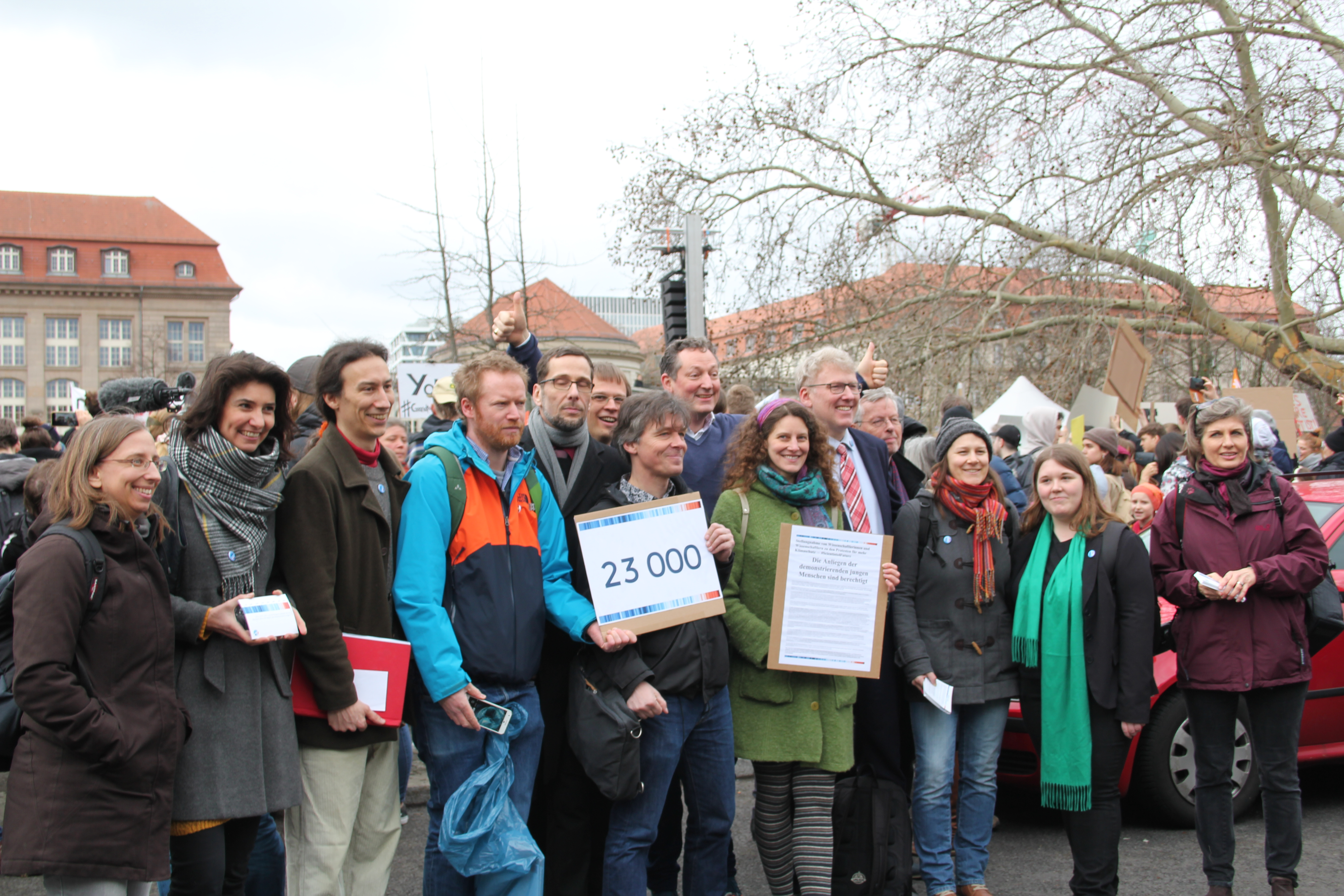
German scientists Volker Quaschning, Eckart von Hirschhausen, Henning Krause, Martin Visbeck and Gregor Hagedorn, at the 15 March 2019 climate march at Invalidenpark, Berlin-Mitte, in front of the Federal Ministry for Economic Affairs and Energy

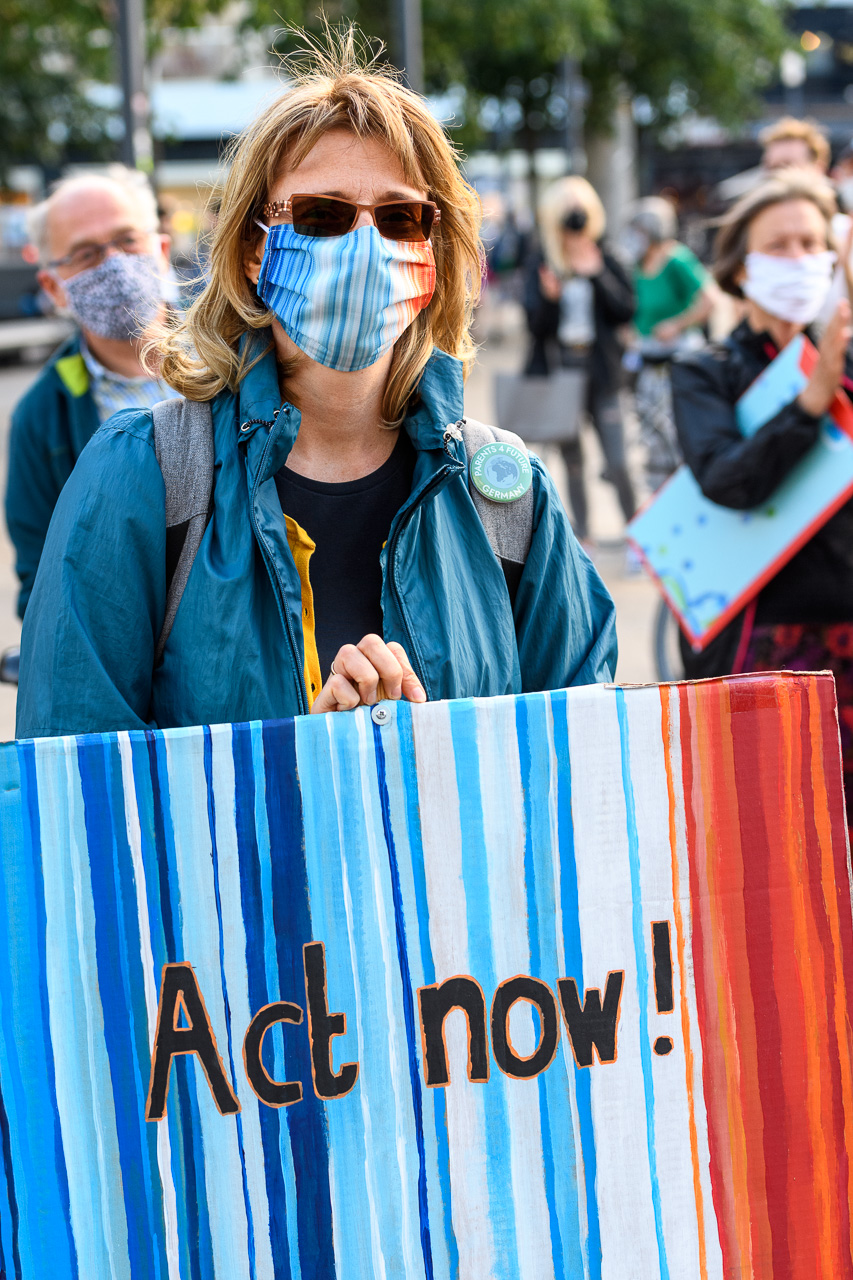
Demonstrator at the July 2020 Monday Demonstration in Berlin, showing warming stripes data visualization graphics on mask and sign

Scientists for Future (S4F) is an international environmental initiative founded by a group of scientists in Germany, Austria, and Switzerland in support of the student movement Fridays for Future (FFF).

In March 2019 the initiative issued a statement titled Statement of scientists and scholars concerning the protests for more climate protection. The statement was signed by 26,800 German-language scientists and scholars from Switzerland, Austria and Germany. The statement took place under the banner Die Anliegen der demonstrierenden jungen Menschen sind berechtigt (The concerns of the demonstrating young people are justified).

== History ==
The foundation of Scientists for Future has its genesis in the initiative taken by Gregor Hagedorn. In April 2019, a lead by Gregor Hagedorn appeared in the journal Science, in which the authors of Scientists for Future called on the research community to support the youth protest movement. In June 2019, this statement, along with an analysis of the results and plausible effects of the declaration, was published as a bilingual article (English and German) in the journal GAIA. There were similar initiatives taken by Dutch and Belgian scientists. In October 2019 Gregor Hagedorn and Scientists for Future were awarded the Award from Federal Association for Sustainability.

== Work ==
Participants seek to:

- Communicate scientific knowledge about climate change and ecological disruption
- Help educate, including improving the understanding of sustainable solutions (including recorded webinars, podcasts and educative events)
- Provide research about climate change
- Connect scientists and people around the world and facilitate mutual support and participation

=== 24 important facts ===
The scientists list 24 established scientific facts on climate change, verified by reference to robust scientific literature. These include facts on:

- the mean temperature rise, and global temperatures in 2015, 2016, 2017 and 2018
- the cause of temperature rise being almost entirely caused by human factors,
- descriptions of the effects of global warming, including a rise in the probability of extreme weather conditions, and the effects on human health.

=== Analyses ===
Nuclear energy

A ~100-paged study by the group published in October 2021 concluded that nuclear fission energy cannot meaningfully contribute to climate change mitigation as it is "too dangerous, too expensive, and too sluggishly deployable" as well as "an obstacle to achieving the social-ecological transformation".

Policies

Participants have also provided analysis, along with recommendations and proposals, of draft laws and policies such as the German Supply Chain Act, EU climate regulations and the EU's Common Agricultural Policy.

Sustainable energy system design

Participating scientists have developed a foundational orientation guide as one input for the creation of pathway-strategies for a "climate-compatible energy supply system", in particular for Germany's energy system.

== See also ==
- Scientists for Extinction Rebellion
- World Scientists' Warning to Humanity
- Gregor Hagedorn
- Climate movement
