= Centre for Science, Development and Media Studies =

India nongovernmental organization

The Centre for Science, Development and Media Studies (CSDMS) is a non-governmental organisation, based in NOIDA outside the Indian capital of New Delhi, that is "involved in advocacy and capacity building of local-level organisations".

Along with conducting training, workshop, and field-research projects in the fields of ICTs (information and communication technologies), it also publishes the i4d magazine, the first monthly magazine on the subject in Asia.

This institute, headed by Ravi Gupta, an alumnus of the Indian Institute of Technology of Kanpur, builds communities of practice around various sub-themes of ICT4D, undertakes research and scoping studies, and documents and monitors projects.
