= Diane Srivastava =

Professor of community ecology

Diane S. Srivastava (born 1969) is a professor of community ecology and ecology of species diversity. Having grown up in the outdoors of Nova Scotia, she attended multiple universities to eventually earn a Ph.D. focused on the ecology of aquatic plants. Her subsequent research after becoming a postdoctoral researcher and then a professor at the University of British Columbia centered around the interactions of bromeliads with species diversity of their surrounding environment, particularly in the neotropics. She received the 2010 E.W.R. Steacie Memorial Fellowship and was made director of the Canadian Institute of Ecology and Evolution in 2017.

== Childhood and education ==
Having spent her childhood in Nova Scotia with her marine biologist parents, Srivastava was highly active in the outdoors and activities including hiking, canoeing, camping, and cross-country skiing. She attended Dalhousie University for her Bachelor's degree in biology and wrote an honors thesis on the aquatic plants of the region. Then proceeding to earn a Master's degree from the University of Toronto where she conducted three years of field research on what aquatic plants snow geese eat in the salt marshes of Hudson Bay.

She then attended Imperial College London for her Ph.D. under John Lawton where she researched aquatic insects in tree hollows, along with spending a year abroad in Cameroon studying how silviculture of the area is used with butterflies and also investigating what aquatic insect species feed upon bracken. Srivastava completed her Ph.D. in 1997 and applied for a postdoctoral position at the University of British Columbia (UBC). Her research on tree hollow ecosystems would be less useful in the area however due to the same hollows having only one trophic level of insect occupying them. A fellow postdoc suggested researching the bromeliad food web, particularly in the less studied neotropics, and it was this topic she suggested in her application.

== Career ==
Srivastava was given the postdoctoral position at UBC in 2001 and continued studying this initial topic of bromeliads ever since, with her field research involving bromeliads in Costa Rica and Brazil. Her work in Costa Rica, alongside Jacqueline Ngai, including testing if increased nitrogen fertilization would improve productivity and leaf growth of bromeliads. She formed the Bromeliad Working Group in 2011 that was focused on organizing all of the scientists internationally that study bromeliads, specifically those studying the species in Central and South America. The Canadian Institute of Ecology and Evolution appointed her as director in 2017.

== Research ==
Published after the completion of her Ph.D., Srivastava produced a 1999 paper on how the methodologies of ecological papers may impact and influence what is observed on the biodiversity between local and regional ecosystems. Depending on what habitats are chosen and in what numbers, she observed, the researchers can bias the results and imply certain distributions of homogeneity of species across a regional species pool that aren't truly accurate. She argued that the interactions between species on a local level could have ramifications on the regional level that wouldn't be observed from studies that only used local–regional richness plot methodologies.

In the 2000s, she worked with Mark Vellend on research involving how conservation policy experiments for preserving ecosystems has largely been applied on only small temporal and spatial scales. Because of this constraint of biodiversity studies, the impact of local controls on a regional group of species and how this affects the ecosystem is unknown. At the same time, their 2005 paper noted that the diversity-stability hypothesis, such that greater diversity leads to greater ecological stability, was not supported by the data and the current state of research on the topic was of little help to conservationists.

Srivastava co-authored a 2012 paper with Bradley Cardinale that provided a systematic review of the over 1,000 ecological studies done in the prior 20 years, whose results were presented at the United Nations Conference on Sustainable Development. After the 2021 heat dome in British Columbia, she created a research group to investigate how the heat dome affected wildlife and ecosystems.

== Awards and honors ==
The 2010 E.W.R. Steacie Memorial Fellowship was given to Srivastava by the Natural Sciences and Engineering Research Council for her general research on how ecosystems are shaped by species. Dr. Srivastava's research that garnered this award is intended to support better policy for ecosystems.

== Personal life ==
Srivastava is married to Tania Zulkoskey and they have two children together. They had their fraternal twins in 2009 and chose to both stay at home with maternity leave, though the law only allowed for one of them to receive employment insurance benefits. They decided to challenge the policy that prevented both from receiving benefits and that listed multiple births as just caring for a single child. They argued against the restriction that because Zulkoskey had twins, rather than each of the partners having a single child, Canadian law did not provide maternity leave to Srivastava as well.
