= Christopher Garrett =

British oceanographer (born 1943)

Christopher John Raymond Garrett FRS, FRSC (born 1943 in Bude) is a British oceanographer, and Lansdowne Professor of Ocean Physics, at University of Victoria. He was a 1981 Guggenheim Fellow.

== Education ==
He earned a B.A. in 1965, and Ph.D. in 1968 from University of Cambridge.

== Career and research ==
He was executive committee member at Centre for Asia-Pacific Initiatives.

== Awards and honours ==
He was elected a Fellow of the Royal Society in 1993.

== Personal life ==
Dr. Garrett is now retired.
