= Marine Chemistry (journal) =

- Discipline: Chemistry
- Language: English
- Edited by: T. S. Bianchi

Publication details
- History: 1972–present
- Publisher: Elsevier
- Frequency: Monthly
- Impact factor: 3.807 (2020)

Standard abbreviations
- ISO 4: Mar. Chem.

Indexing
- ISSN: 0304-4203

Links
- Journal homepage

Marine Chemistry is an international peer-reviewed scientific journal for publications in the field of chemistry in the marine environment. The journal is currently published by Elsevier. Its editor-in-chief is T. S. Bianchi. According to the Journal Citation Reports, Marine Chemistry has a 2020 impact factor of 3.807.
