= Shubha Sathyendranath =

Marine scientist

- Scientific career
- Thesis: INFLUENCE DES SUBSTANCES EN SOLUTION ET EN SUSPENSION DANS LES EAUX DE MER SUR L'ABSORPTION ET LA REFLECTANCE. MODELISATION ET APPLICATIONS A LA TELEDETECTION (1981)

Shubha Platt MBE (née Sathyendranath), known professionally as Shubha Sathyendranath, is a marine scientist known for her work on marine optics and remote sensing of ocean colour. She is the 2021 recipient of the A.G. Huntsman Award for Excellence in the Marine Sciences.

== Career ==
Sathyendranath's education took place in India and France. In 2003 she was lead scientist of Partnership for Observation of the Global Oceans. As of 2022 she is a scientist at Plymouth Marine Laboratory.

Sathyendranath was appointed Member of the Order of the British Empire (MBE) in the 2023 Birthday Honours for services to oceanography.

== Research ==
Sathyendranath's early research was on the development of algorithms define water masses based on their optical properties and how phytoplankton change the absorption of light in water. She then went on to use satellites to quantify primary production in seawater through work that was done in collaboration with Trevor Platt. This research led to global estimates of primary production. Her research also revealed that diatoms and growth rates of phytoplankton could be defined from satellite imagery. She is also partnering with institutes in Brazil and India to study water-borne illnesses like cholerae through field expeditions and remote sensing.

== Selected publications ==
- Sathyendranath, Shubha; Lazzara, Luigi; Prieur, Louis (1987). "Variations in the spectral values of specific absorption of phytoplankton: Phytoplankton specific absorption". Limnology and Oceanography. 32 (2): 403–415. doi:10.4319/lo.1987.32.2.0403.
- Sathyendranath, S.; Prieur, L.; Morel, A. (1989-08-01). "A three-component model of ocean colour and its application to remote sensing of phytoplankton pigments in coastal waters". International Journal of Remote Sensing. 10 (8): 1373–1394. Bibcode:1989IJRS...10.1373S. doi:10.1080/01431168908903974. ISSN 0143-1161.
- Platt, Trevor; Sathyendranath, Shubha (1988-09-23). "Oceanic Primary Production: Estimation by Remote Sensing at Local and Regional Scales". Science. 241 (4873): 1613–1620. Bibcode:1988Sci...241.1613P. doi:10.1126/science.241.4873.1613. ISSN 0036-8075. PMID 17820892. S2CID 2636296.
- Rusch, Douglas B.; Halpern, Aaron L.; Sutton, Granger; Heidelberg, Karla B.; Williamson, Shannon; Yooseph, Shibu; Wu, Dongying; Eisen, Jonathan A.; Hoffman, Jeff M.; Remington, Karin; Beeson, Karen; Tran, Bao; Smith, Hamilton; Baden-Tillson, Holly; Stewart, Clare (2007-03-13). "The Sorcerer II Global Ocean Sampling Expedition: Northwest Atlantic through Eastern Tropical Pacific". PLOS Biology. 5 (3): e77. doi:10.1371/journal.pbio.0050077. ISSN 1545-7885. PMC 1821060. PMID 17355176.

== Awards and honors ==
In 2021, Sathyendranath received the A.G. Huntsman Award for Excellence in the Marine Sciences. In 2022 she received the Monaco's Knight of the Order of Cultural Merit.
