= Karen Helen Wiltshire =

Irish environmental scientist

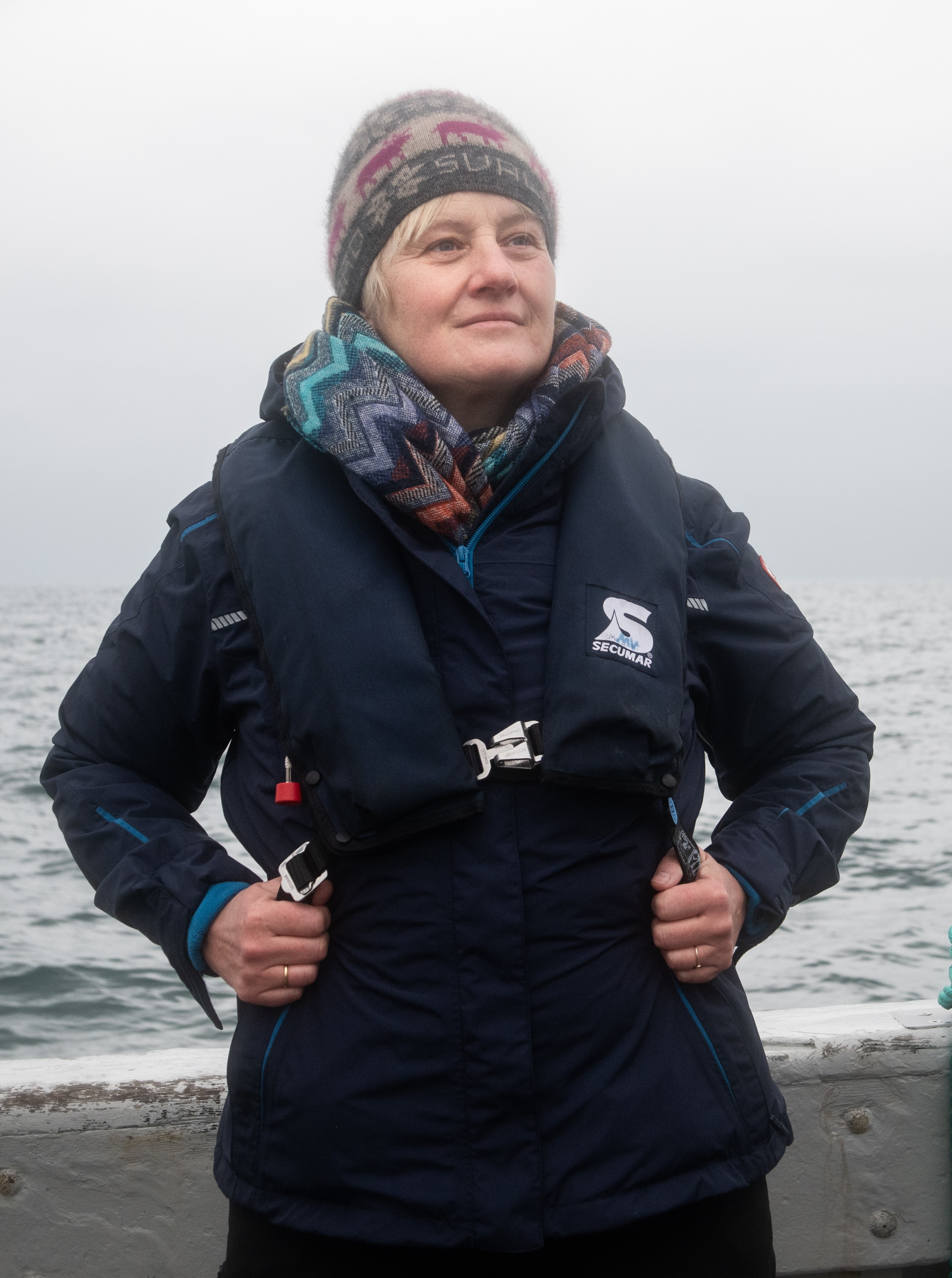
- Born: 1962 (age 63–64); Dublin, Ireland
- Education: University of Hamburg; Trinity College Dublin
- Scientific career
- Fields: Environmental science
- Workplaces: University of Bremen; Trinity College Dublin

Karen Helen Wiltshire (born 1962) is an Irish and German Climate and Marine Scientist. She is a Professor of Climate Science and E3 CRH Chair of Climate Science at Trinity College Dublin, as well as a Professor of Shelf-Ecosystems at the University of Kiel in Germany. Karen was one of the first women in a Directorate of a Helmholtz research center in Germany, becoming Vice Director of the Alfred Wegener Institute for Polar and Marine Research (AWI) 2006-2024.

Born in Dublin, Wiltshire studied at Maynooth University and Trinity College Dublin, graduating with a Master's degree in Environmental science. She received her PhD (1992) and Habilitation (2001) in Hydrobiology at the University of Hamburg. She has held leadership positions in several major international scientific institutions - GKSS Geesthacht, the University of St. Andrews, Scotland, University of Groningen, Netherlands and the Max Planck Institute of Limnology, Germany. She was appointed Professor of Geomicrobiology at Jacobs University, Germany in 2006. In her research capacity, she contributed to the preservation of the North Sea "Helgoland Roads Time Series" data set, by linking it to international databases and models showing marine ecosystem change due to climate and environmental factors.

Karen Wiltshire co-founded Scientists for Future in Germany, and was the first female chair of POGO (Partnership for Observations in the Global Oceans). She has helped shape national and international science policy contributing to UNEP, SCOR-UNESCO, IPCC, IIASA, ICES and as a lead coordinating author for GEO07 Ocean and Coasts.

Wiltshire co-founded the Ocean Training Partnership with POGO, as well as the All-Atlantic Sea Network for training early career ocean professionals. She was the Director of the NIPPON-POGO Centre for Excellence for Oceanography for 10 Years.

In 2024, Wiltshire was appointed as the Professor of Climate Science in Trinity College Dublin and holds the CRH Chair of Climate Science.

In 2025, she was made a fellow of Trinity College Dublin.

In November 2025 Karen Helen Wiltshire was awarded the international AG Huntsman Award (https://www.huntsmanaward.org/) for Excellence in Marine Science. She was honoured for her research into the effects climate change on marine ecosystems, her initiation of Marine Shipboard training platforms (Pogo Ocean Training Partnership) and her international work on marine and climate policy.
