= Canadian Institute of Ecology and Evolution =

The Canadian Institute of Ecology and Evolution (CIEE) is a Canadian organization that sponsors research on natural systems and facilitates communication on the ecological and evolutionary aspects of public policy. The CIEE is operated by a consortium of Canadian universities, including Carleton University, McGill University, University of British Columbia and the University of Toronto. In addition, the CIEE is supported by the Canadian Society for Ecology and Evolution, the national learned society. Typical programs involve research on invasive weeds, species and ecosystems at risk, and adaptations to climate change.

== History and organization ==
First steps to establish the CIEE were taken in 2007 at the inaugural meeting of the Canadian Society for Ecology and Evolution, the national learned society. In May 2008, after a nationwide competition that received entries from some of Canada's most prestigious universities, the Society's Governing Council selected the proposal from the University of Toronto to house and operate the CIEE at the Koffler Scientific Reserve under the direction of Professor Arthur E. Weis. In 2012 Dr. Peter Leavitt was appointed Director and administration of the CIEE moved to the University of Regina, while programming continued to be distributed around the country. As of 2014 the CIEE was housed at the Institute of Environmental Change and Society (IECS) at the University of Regina.

As of 2019 the CIEE is located at the Biodiversity Research Centre at the University of British Columbia in Vancouver. Diane Srivastava was appointed director in 2017.

In 2023, the organization launched the "Living Data" project, with partners across Canada.
