= Hynes Award for New Investigators =

Award given by the Society for Freshwater Science

The Hynes Award for New Investigators is awarded by the Society for Freshwater Science and recognizes an excellent academic research paper in the freshwater sciences by a scientist less than five years after their terminal graduate degree (usually, a doctorate). Recipients of the award have gone on to become leading senior researchers, serving as science advisors to various governments and states, and held leadership positions in national and international scientific societies.

The award is named after H.B. Noel Hynes, a British biologist who worked at the University of Liverpool and the University of Waterloo, where he was a world-leading expert on freshwater invertebrates and ecology.

== Recipients ==
Award Year	Recipient	Paper Title	Co-authors	Paper Publication Year	Journal
2021	Rafael M. Almeida	"Reducing greenhouse gas emissions of Amazon hydropower with strategic dam planning"	Qinru Shi, Jonathan M. Gomes-Selman, Xiaojian Wu, Yexiang Xue, Hector Angarita, Nathan Barros, Bruce R. Forsberg, Roosevelt García-Villacorta, Stephen K. Hamilton, John M. Melack, Mariana Montoya, Guillaume Perez, Suresh A. Sethi, Carla P. Gomes, Alexander S. Flecker	2019	Nature Communications
2020	Amanda L. Subalusky	"Annual mass drownings of the Serengeti wildebeest migration influence nutrient cycling and storage in the Mara River"	Christopher L. Dutton, Emma J. Rosi, David M. Post	2017	Proceedings of the National Academy of Sciences of the United States of America
2019	Daniel Nelson	"Experimental whole‐stream warming alters community size structure"	Jonathan P. Benstead, Alexander D. Huryn, Wyatt F. Cross, James M. Hood, Philip W. Johnson, James R. Junker, Gísli M. Gíslason, Jón S. Ólafsson	2017	Global Change Biology
2018	Amanda G. DelVecchia	"Ancient and methane-derived carbon subsidizes contemporary food webs"	Jack A. Stanford, Xiaomei Xu	2016	Nature Communications
2016	Erin R. Hotchkiss	"Whole‐stream ^{13}C tracer addition reveals distinct fates of newly fixed carbon"	Robert O. Hall Jr.	2015	Ecology
2015	Carla L. Atkinson	"Tracing Consumer-Derived Nitrogen in Riverine Food Webs"	Jeffrey F. Kelly, Caryn C. Vaughn	2014	Ecosystems
2014	Daniel C. Allen	"Bottom-up biodiversity effects increase resource subsidy flux between ecosystems"	Caryn C. Vaughn, Jeffrey F. Kelly, Joshua T. Cooper, Michael H. Engel	2012	Ecology
2013	Michael T. Bogan	"Severe drought drives novel community trajectories in desert stream pools"	David A. Lytle	2011	Freshwater Biology
2012	Ronald D. Bassar	"Local adaptation in Trinidadian guppies alters ecosystem processes"	Michael C. Marshall, Andrés López-Sepulcre, Eugenia Zandonà, Sonya K. Auer, Joseph Travis, Catherine M. Pringle, Alexander S. Flecker, Steven A. Thomas, Douglas F. Fraser, David N. Reznick	2010	Proceedings of the National Academy of Sciences of the United States of America
2011	Debra S. Finn	"Demographic Stability Metrics for Conservation Prioritization of Isolated Populations"	Michael T. Bogan, David A. Lytle	2009	Conservation Biology
2010	John M. Davis	"Long-term nutrient enrichment decouples predator and prey production"	Amy D. Rosemond, Susan L. Eggert, Wyatt F. Cross, J. Bruce Wallace	2010	Proceedings of the National Academy of Sciences of the United States of America
2009	Brian J. Roberts	"Multiple Scales of Temporal Variability in Ecosystem Metabolism Rates: Results from 2 Years of Continuous Monitoring in a Forested Headwater Stream"	Patrick J. Mulholland, Walter R. Hill	2007	Ecosystems
2008	Peter B. McIntyre	"Fish extinctions alter nutrient recycling in tropical freshwaters"	Laura E. Jones, Alexander S. Flecker, Michael J. Vanni	2007	Proceedings of the National Academy of Sciences of the United States of America
2007	Brad W. Taylor	"Loss of a Harvested Fish Species Disrupts Carbon Flow in a Diverse Tropical River"	Alexander S. Flecker, Robert O. Hall Jr.	2006	Science
2006	Jack Brookshire	"Coupled cycling of dissolved organic nitrogen and carbon in a forest stream"	H. Maurice Valett, Steven A. Thomas, Jackson R. Webster	2005	Ecology
2005	Colden V. Baxter	"Fish invasion restructures stream and forest food webs by interrupting reciprocal prey subsidies"	Kurt D. Fausch, Masashi Murakami, Phillip L. Chapman	2004	Ecology
2004	Emily S. Bernhardt	"Dissolved Organic Carbon Enrichment Alters Nitrogen Dynamics in a Forest Stream"	Gene E. Likens	2002	Ecology
2003	Bradley J. Cardinale	"Species diversity enhances ecosystem functioning through interspecific facilitation"	Margaret A. Palmer, Scott L. Collins	2002	Nature
2002	David A. Lytle	"Flash floods and aquatic insect life-history evolution: evaluation of multiple models"		2002	Ecology
2001	Michelle A. Baker	"Organic Carbon Supply and Metabolism in a Shallow Groundwater Ecosystem"	H. Maurice Valett, Clifford N. Dahm	2000	Ecology
2000	Robert O. Hall Jr.	"The trophic significance of bacteria in a detritus‐based stream food web"	Judith L. Meyer	1998	Ecology
