= Bradley Cardinale =

American ecologist and conservation biologist

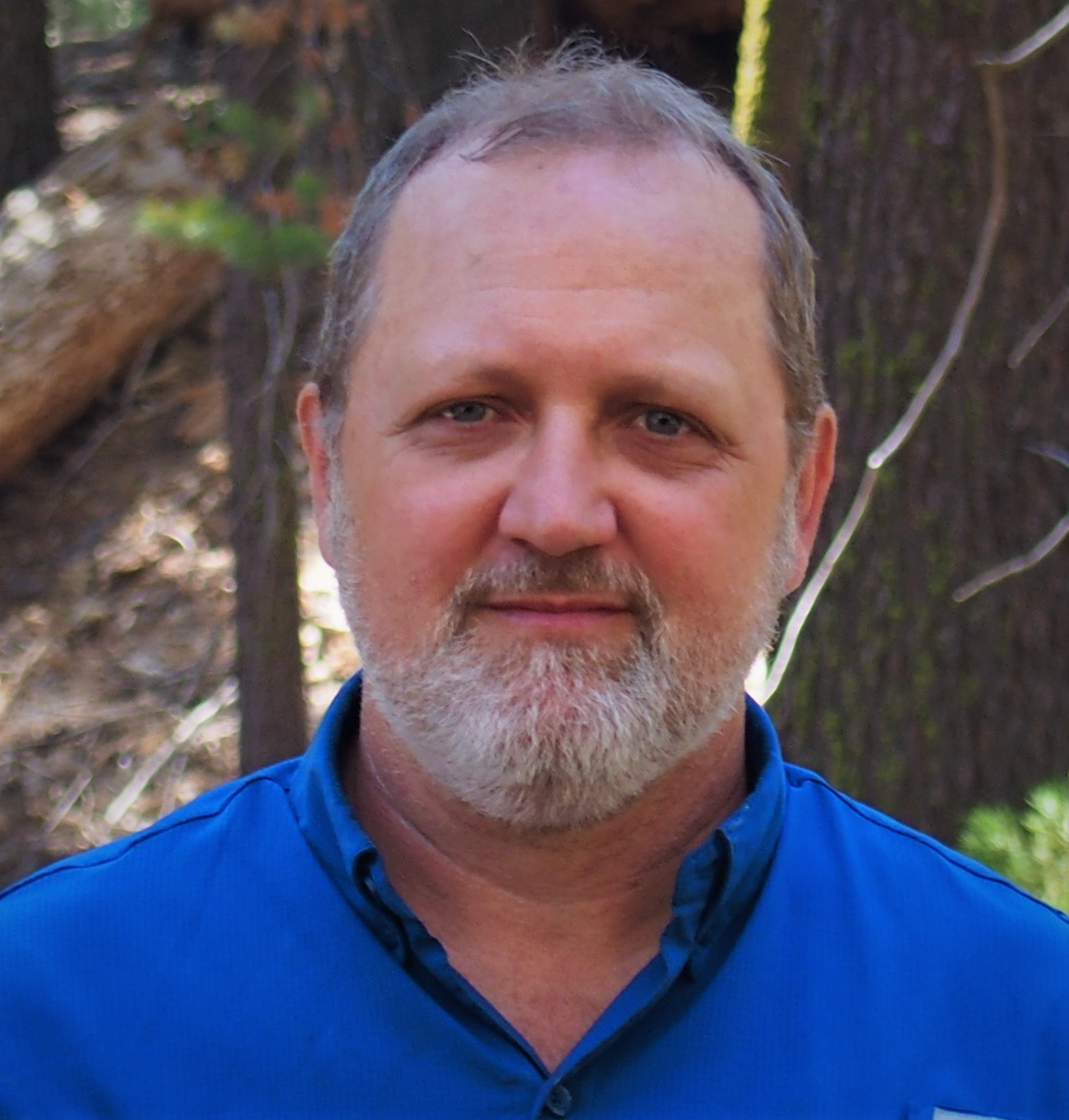
- Occupations: Ecologist, conservation biologist, academic and researcher

Academic background
- Education: B.S., Biology; M.S., Fisheries and Wildlife; Ph.D., Biology
- Alma mater: Arizona State University; Michigan State University; University of Maryland
- Doctoral advisor: Margaret A. Palmer

Academic work
- Discipline: Ecologist
- Sub-discipline: Conservation biologist

Bradley Cardinale is an American ecologist, conservation biologist, academic and researcher. He is currently a professor in the Department of Ecosystem Science and Management at Penn State University.

Cardinale's work has focused on the conservation and restoration of biodiversity in natural systems, as well as the ecological design of human engineered systems that benefit from biodiversity. He uses mathematical models, lab- and field-based experiments, observational studies of natural ecosystems, and meta-analyses of existing data to examine how human activities impact Earth's biological diversity, and to protect and manage species, their ecosystems, and the services they provide to society. He has written over 150 scientific papers, as well as a textbook on conservation biology.

Cardinale is an elected fellow of the American Association for the Advancement of Science, and the Ecological Society of America. In 2014, Cardinale was named by Thomson Reuters as one of The World's Most Influential Scientific Minds.

== Early life and education ==
Cardinale was born in Phoenix, Arizona in 1969. He studied at Arizona State University where, in 1993, he received a B.S. in biology.

After receiving his bachelor's degree, Cardinale went on to receive an M.S. in Fisheries and Wildlife in 1996 from Michigan State University where he helped develop methods for restoring coastal wetlands in the Great Lakes. He then went on to complete a Ph.D. in biology from the University of Maryland in 2002 where he led projects focused on the restoration of biodiversity and ecosystem processes in degraded streams in the Appalachian Mountains. Following his Ph.D., Cardinale completed a postdoctoral fellowship in the Department of Zoology at the University of Wisconsin-Madison.

== Career ==
In 2005, Cardinale joined the Department of Ecology, Evolution, and Marine Biology at the University of California, Santa Barbara as an assistant professor, becoming associate professor in 2010. In 2011, he left the University of California, Santa Barbara to join the University of Michigan, where he became a full professor in 2015. He served as coordinator of the Conservation Ecology Program at the University of Michigan from 2012 to 2014. He left the University of Michigan in 2021 to join Penn State University as head of the Department of Ecosystem Science and Management.

In 2013, he was elected by the U.S. National Academy of Science as one of three U.S. representatives on the inaugural Science Committee of the United Nations initiative Future Earth. Future Earth was a reorganization of the United Nations Environmental Programme (UNEP) that merged five discipline-based global change programs into a single, multidisciplinary research program.

Between 2009 and 2013, Cardinale helped form the U.S. National Ecological Observatory Network (NEON), assisting with selection of the core aquatic sites, and serving on the Pacific-Southwest Domain Science Committee. He was also co-PI with Walter Dodds and Margaret A. Palmer on the proposal that established the Stream Observational and Experimental Network (STREON) – a coordinated set of national climate change experiments that were ultimately eliminated from NEON as part of budget cuts and descoping.

Cardinale received the Hynes Award for New Investigators from the Society for Freshwater Science in 2003. He also received the Burton V. Barnes Award from the Sierra Club in 2015 for his leadership in organizing academic scientists at 13 state-universities in Michigan to speak out against anti-biodiversity legislation that was intended to make state lands more accessible to fracking, lumbering, and mining. That effort ultimately led to the legislation being vetoed by Michigan's governor.

In 2016, Cardinale was appointed as the director of Cooperative Institute for Great Lakes Research (CIGLR). CIGLR is one of 16 Cooperative Institutes across the U.S. that are funded by NOAA to link government research labs to university partners, non-governmental organizations, and private business partners who help them accomplish their research and development goals.

== Research and work ==
Cardinale's research focuses on the conservation and restoration of biodiversity, as well as the use of ecological design to improve human engineered ecosystems. Most of his work has focused on the management of biodiversity in freshwater habitats (streams, lakes, wetlands), though he has worked in ecosystems as diverse as grasslands, forests, and kelp beds.

Work from the Cardinale Lab has received extensive recognition in the popular media, leading to numerous interviews on U.S. National Public Radio (NPR), and coverage in Reuters, the British Broadcast Corporation (BBC), and the Canadian Broadcast Corporation (CBC).

=== Conservation biology ===
A significant part of Cardinale's research has focused on developing a key argument for biodiversity conservation, which is that biodiversity is the foundation for a healthy planet. His work has shown that loss of biodiversity impacts important ecological processes that are essential to the productivity and stability of ecosystems, as well as the goods and services they provide to humans.

Cardinale and his colleagues have developed a suite of mathematical models to describe how the biological traits of species, interactions among species, and the structure of entire food webs influence essential processes like primary production, decomposition, and nutrient cycling. He has tested the predictions of these models in both field and lab-based experiments, primarily using freshwater organisms as model systems. His experiments were among the first to show that biodiversity enhances the efficiency and productivity of ecosystems through niche partitioning among species, and via facilitative interactions that cause diverse communities to be greater than the sum-of-their-parts. These mechanisms had long-been presumed to operate in nature, but empirical evidence was lacking.

Cardinale is perhaps best known for his leadership in organizing major data syntheses that have helped foster a consensus about the probable consequences of biodiversity loss for humanity. He has organized numerous working groups funded by the U.S. National Science Foundation, the United Nations Environmental Program, the National Center for Ecological Analysis and Synthesis, and the Socio-Economic Environmental Synthesis Center. In these working groups, Cardinale and his colleagues have assembled extensive datasets of thousands of experiments and observational studies that have quantified how changes in biodiversity impact a wide variety of ecological processes and ecosystem services for organisms inhabiting 30 biomes on 5 continents. Their syntheses have led to publication of 15 formal meta-analyses.

In 2012, Cardinale organized and led an invited review for a special issue of Nature dedicated to the 20th anniversary of the Rio Earth Summit in which his colleagues and he synthesized over 1,700 papers that have examined biodiversity's impact on 34 ecosystem goods and services. This synthesis revealed a remarkable level of generality in how biodiversity impacts the functioning of Earth's ecosystems and the services they provide to society. Recently, Cardinale and colleagues have extended the idea of ecosystem services to the realm of national security, showing how nature mitigates conflicts and disasters that lead to security crises.

=== Restoration ecology ===
Cardinale has also conducted considerable research on the restoration of ecosystems and their biodiversity. During his early graduate studies, Cardinale worked on restoration of Great Lakes coastal wetlands in Lake Huron that had been drained for agriculture. He showed that, once hydrologic connectivity is re-established, the vegetation of drained wetlands could be restored from existing seed banks that had survived nearly a hundred years of farming in agricultural soils. He also showed that certain forms of stocking and augmentation could help re-establish natural invertebrate communities that form the base of the wetland food webs.

Later in his graduate studies, Cardinale turned attention towards stream restoration where he experimentally tested common techniques that are used to restore streams in the Appalachian Mountains of the eastern United States. His work helped determine which techniques statistically enhance the recovery of biodiversity and important ecological processes, and which techniques have the highest success rates for restoration.

In the early 2010s, Cardinale worked on collaborative projects with biologists and geomorphologists to evaluate the success of gravel augmentation in restoring spawning habitat for endangered Chinook salmon. Working in a restored section of the Merced River in central California, he and his students demonstrated that gravel augmentation does, in fact, enhance spawning habitat for Chinook. But the practice also leads to abnormally mobile streambeds that can damage salmonid eggs, reduce the abundance and alter the composition of food items, and change feeding rates, survival and growth of native fish, including juvenile salmon that hatch from spawning beds.

In 2017, Cardinale established the Cooperative Institute for Great Lakes Research (CIGLR), which brings together academic institutions with government agencies and private businesses who work together on achieving sustainable use of the Great Lakes. With funding from NOAA and the Great Lakes Restoration Initiative, CIGLR and its 40+ scientific staff have worked on restoring Great Lakes Areas of Concern, restoration of coastal fish habitat, management of invasive species, and remediation of coastal zones impacted by harmful algal blooms and hypoxia.

=== Ecological design ===
A final portion of Cardinale's research program lies at the intersection of ecology and engineering where he has used principles of ecological design to improve the efficiency and sustainability of human engineered ecosystems. He has completed a number of experiments and published several key papers showing that the composition of species in biological communities can be manipulated to maximize removal of pollutants from freshwater. In 2011, he published a paper in Nature showing that streams managed to maximize biodiversity of algae are more efficient at removing nutrient pollutants like nitrates from the water than less diverse systems. Soon after, he extended this work to consider emerging contaminants, and showed that certain combinations of species could be manipulated to maximize removal of titanium-dioxide nanoparticles from stream water.

Cardinale has also examined how biological communities can be engineered to maximize erosion control, and minimize the loss of sediments from stream bottoms and riverbanks. He and his research group have shown that enhancing plant diversity of native vegetation along streambanks creates complex rooting systems that help reduce the chance of bank sloughing and failure. In addition, they have shown that small insects that live on the bottom of streams can bind rocks together as they spin nets to construct their homes, and these nets significantly reduce the probability of streambed erosion during floods.

Since 2013, Cardinale has been studying how ecological design might be used to improve the efficiency and sustainability of algal biofuel systems. He and his lab group have shown that certain combinations of species can maximize the production of algal feedstocks, and that species combinations can be developed such that they are complimentary in their recycling of expensive fertilizers that are used to cultivate algae in outdoor ponds. Further, he has shown that nesting complimentary species within more diverse communities of algae can help alleviate problems associated with pathogens, parasites, and predators that often cause feedstocks to crash.

== Awards and honors ==
- 2003 - Hynes Award for New Investigators, Society for Freshwater Science
- 2010 - Harold J. Plous Memorial Award, University of California, Santa Barbara
- 2013 - Elected member, Science Committee of Future Earth
- 2013 - Elected fellow, American Association for the Advancement of Science
- 2015 - Burton V. Barnes Award for Excellence in Academia, Sierra Club
- 2017 - Elected fellow, Ecological Society of America

== Publications ==
=== Books ===
- Cardinale, B. J., R. B. Primack, and J. D. Murdock. 2019. Conservation Biology, 1st edition. Oxford University Press. New York, NY. 672 pages.
- Cardinale, B. J., and J. D. Murdock. 2025. Conservation Biology, 2nd edition. Oxford University Press. New York, NY. 569 pages.

=== Selected papers ===
- Cardinale, B. J., J. E. Duffy, and R. Schoonover. 2026. Nature's role in national security. Nature-Based Solutions, 9:100330, 10.1016/j.nbsj.2026.100330.
- Cardinale, B. J., Duffy, J. E., Gonzalez, A., Hooper, D. U., Perrings, C., Venail, P., ... Naeem, S. (2012). Biodiversity loss and its impact on humanity. Nature, 486(7401), 59–67.
- Duffy, J. E., C. M. Godwin, and B. J. Cardinale. 2017. Biodiversity effects in the wild are common and as strong as key drivers of productivity. Nature, 549:261-264.
- Cardinale, B. J., Srivastava, D. S., Emmett Duffy, J., Wright, J. P., Downing, A. L., Sankaran, M., & Jouseau, C. (2006). Effects of biodiversity on the functioning of trophic groups and ecosystems. Nature, 443(7114), 989–992.
- Hooper, D. U., Adair, E. C., Cardinale, B. J., Byrnes, J. E. K., Hungate, B. A., Matulich, K. L., ... O'Connor, M. I. (2012). A global synthesis reveals biodiversity loss as a major driver of ecosystem change. Nature, 486(7401), 105–108.
- Cardinale, B. J., Wright, J. P., Cadotte, M. W., Carroll, I. T., Hector, A., Srivastava, D. S., ... Weis, J. J. (2007). Impacts of plant diversity on biomass production increase through time because of species complementarity. Proceedings of the National Academy of Sciences, 104(46), 18123–18128.
- Cardinale, Bradley J., Matulich, K. L., Hooper, D. U., Byrnes, J. E., Duffy, E., Gamfeldt, L., ... Gonzalez, A. (2011). The functional role of producer diversity in ecosystems. American Journal of Botany, 98(3), 572–592.
- Cardinale, B. J., Palmer, M. A., & Collins, S. L. (2002). Species diversity enhances ecosystem functioning through interspecific facilitation. Nature, 415(6870), 426–429
- Duffy, J. E., Cardinale, B. J., France, K. E., McIntyre, P. B., Thébault, E., & Loreau, M. (2007). The functional role of biodiversity in ecosystems: incorporating trophic complexity. Ecology Letters, 10(6), 522–538.
- Cardinale, Bradley J. (2011). Biodiversity improves water quality through niche partitioning. Nature, 472(7341), 86–89.
- Godwin, C. M., D. C. Hietala, A. R. Lashaway, A. Narwani, P. E. Savage, B. J. Cardinale. 2018. Ecological stoichiometry meets ecological engineering: Using algal polycultures to enhance the multi-functionality of algal biocrude systems. Environmental Science & Technology, 51:11450-11458
- Albertson, L. K., L. S. Skylar, S. D. Cooper, and B. J. Cardinale. 2019. Do aquatic macroinvertebrates stabilize gravel bed sediment? A field test using silk net-spinning caddisflies. PLoS One 14:e0209087
- Allen, D. C., B. J. Cardinale, and T. Wynn-Thompson. 2018. Riparian plant biodiversity reduces stream channel migration rates. Ecohydrology.
