= Emily Bernhardt =

American ecosystem ecologist and biogeochemist

- Education: University of North Carolina at Chapel Hill (B.S.), Cornell University (PhD)
- Known for: Ecosystem ecology, Biogeochemistry
- Scientific career
- Workplaces: Duke University

Emily Snow Bernhardt is an American ecosystem ecologist, biogeochemist, and a professor at Cornell University .

Bernhardt studies the effects of land use change, global change, and chemical pollution on aquatic and terrestrial ecosystems and is the co-author of an award-winning text book on biogeochemistry. She also served as the president of the Society for Freshwater Science from 2016 to 2017.

== Education and early career ==
Bernhardt received her Bachelor of Sciences degree in biology with a minor in chemistry from the University of North Carolina, Chapel Hill in 1996. Her love for nature, including hiking in the Appalachian Mountains, as well as many research experiences as an undergraduate (including an REU at University of Michigan Biological Station) inspired her to become an ecologist.

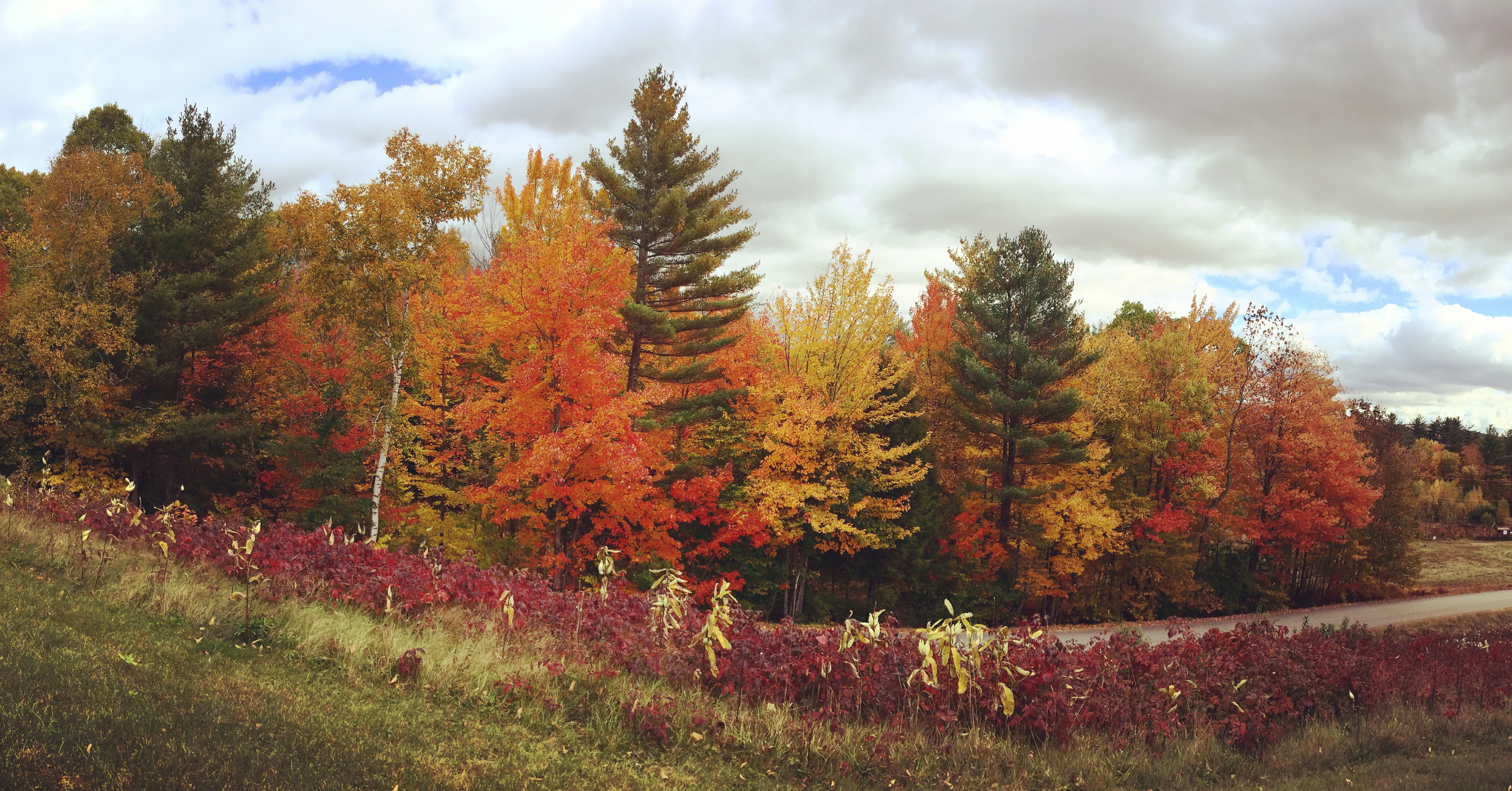
Hubbard Brook Experimental Forest where Bernhardt conducted her dissertation research.

In her final year at UNC, Bernhardt was awarded an NSF Graduate Research Fellowship to pursue a PhD at Cornell University, co-advised by Cornell faculty Bobbi Peckarsky and Institute of Ecosystem Studies director Gene Likens. Bernhardt conducted her dissertation research at the Hubbard Brook Experimental Forest, in New Hampshire, USA, studying how headwater streams modify watershed nutrient export. Bernhardt also conducted research in Venezuela and Chile during her graduate career.

While presenting a poster at the Ecological Society of America conference, Bernhardt met her future postdoctoral advisor, Bill Schlesinger, who was a professor at Duke University at the time and offered her a position on the spot. As a postdoc, Bernhardt continued to work on nitrogen cycling, however, this time focusing in the rooting zones of pine trees in poorly drained soils rather than in streams. She returned to working in aquatic systems as a postdoc in 2002, organizing the National River Restoration Science Synthesis under guidance from Margaret Palmer and Dave Allen which resulted in a highly cited publication in the journal Science. As a postdoc in Palmer's lab, Bernhardt also helped Margaret organize the Ecological Society of America's "Visions" project which identified future priorities for ecological sciences in the 21st century, stating that "Ecological knowledge can and must play a central role in helping achieve a world in which human populations exist within sustainable ecological systems".

== Career ==
Bernhardt became a professor at Duke University in 2004 in the Department of Biology, and ran a research group there until 2026 when she moved to Cornell University to become the Director of the Cornell's Atkinson Center for Sustainability. Broadly, Bernhardt and her lab members research how ecosystems retain and transform elements and energy and how these ecosystem processes may be changing as the result of human activities. The ecosystems that Bernhardt studies include both aquatic and terrestrial systems, and her lab strives to make their research applicable to "political, legal and regulatory discussions about the protection and management of ecosystems".

=== Stream ecosystem function ===
Bernhardt started studying stream ecosystem function beginning in graduate school, when she examined how headwater streams modify watershed nutrient export at Hubbard Brook Experimental Forest, and she has continued to work on questions related to stream ecosystem function throughout her career. Bernhardt and colleagues synthesized over 37,000 stream restoration projects across the US to identify the common elements of successful restoration projects finding that on average greater than one billion US dollars are spent on stream restoration each year since 1990. Most stream restoration projects are small in scale and cost (~$45k) but poorly reported, and collectively, these small projects' costs are greater and their impact is broader than higher-cost projects, and Bernhardt and colleagues urged for better effort to collect and disseminated data on small restoration projects.

Leveraging long-term datasets at Hubbard Brook and other sites, Bernhardt and her colleagues have studied the effects of climate change and whole-ecosystem experimental treatments on watershed nitrogen export.

Bernhardt and colleagues have leveraged a network of in situ sensors and created a database for hosting open-access stream sensor datasets to address questions relating to stream ecosystem function. There work has primarily focused on variation and patterns of stream metabolism across hundreds of U.S. streams, but plan to expand to measure and host data from streams globally.

=== Mountaintop coal mining ===
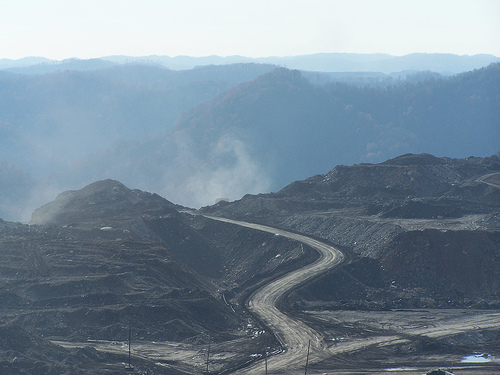
A mountaintop removal mining site.

Funded by the National Science Foundation from 2014 to 2017 and from the Foundation for the Carolinas, Bernhardt and her colleagues have studied the impacts of mountaintop removal mining with valley fills (MTMVF) on stream ecosystems. Mountaintop removal mining uses explosives to remove up to 400 vertical feet of mountain to expose underlying coal seams for extraction and excess rock is dumped into nearby valleys where headwater streams reside. It's estimated that nearly 1,800 miles of headwater streams have been buried by mountain top mining since 1990. Bernhardt's research showed that the extent of surface mining in West Virginia catchments was highly correlated with stream sulfate concentrations and ionic strength, causing biological impairment when only 5.4% of a stream's contributing catchment is occupied by surface coal mines. In 2005, 22% of West Virginia's regional stream network length drained catchments with >5.4% of their surface area converted to mining operations. Bernhardt and colleagues have also shown that mountaintop removal mining can have significant impacts on terrestrial ecosystems, for example, they estimate that previously forested mine sites would take around 5,000 years for a hectare of reclaimed mine land to sequester the same amount of carbon that is released when the coal is extracted and burned.

Bernhardt's lab has also used trace elements found in fish otoliths as biogenic tracers to track coal ash contamination in affected lakes, marking the first time that strontium isotope ratios have been used to track coal ash's impacts in living organisms.

Bernhardt wrote an article for PBS in which she explained what Clean Coal is and some of the myths behind clean coal, ending with an urge to use the label 'clean energy' more sparingly.

=== Scientific training and culture ===
In addition to writing about scientific results, Bernhardt also writes about scientific career trajectories, academic training, science culture, and work–life balance in academic positions across many career stages. In an article in The Chronicle of Higher Education, Bernhardt and co-authors urge scientists to prioritize intellectual curiosity, societal impact, and creativity rather than focusing only on traditional academic success metrics (e.g. H-index). As president of the Society for Freshwater Science, Bernhardt wrote an essay titled "Being Kind" which was featured in the journal Nature. In this essay, Bernhardt addresses two issues surrounding the Society for Freshwater Science 2017 annual meeting, 1) concerns of the meeting being held in North Carolina after the state passed the controversial Public Facilities Privacy & Security Act, and 2) reported incidents from Society for Freshwater Science members in which senior scientists said unpleasant of hurtful things to junior members at annual meetings. Bernhardt expresses her disgust of both issues and offers her thoughts on how to amend the culture within the Society for Freshwater Science, focusing on a quote that was popular on Twitter stating, "Everyone here is smart, distinguish yourself by being kind." Bernhardt goes on to reflect on specific instances in her career when her mentors and colleagues expressed kindness to her and how those acts impacted her graduate school experience and career trajectory. She encourages everyone to counteract implicit biases by being kind to everyone with whom we interact, ending the essay with an unofficial and aspirational motto for the 2017 SFS meeting of "Everyone here is smart and kind".

== Awards ==
- Member of the National Academy of Sciences (2023).
- Fellow of the American Geophysical Union (2022).
- Fellow of the Ecological Society of America (2018)
- Bass Society Fellow of Duke University (2017)
- Mercer Award for best paper by scientists under 40 by the Ecological Society of America (2015). Marcelo Ardón was lead author. Link to paper.
- Friedrich Wilhelm Bessel Award, Alexander von Humboldt Foundation, (Germany) (2015)
- Leopold Leadership Fellow (2015)
- International IGB Fellowship in Freshwater Sciences, Leibniz-Institute for Freshwater Ecology and Inland Fisheries, Berlin, Germany (2014)
- Textbook Excellence Award (Texty) from the Text and Academic Authors Association for Biogeochemistry: An Analysis of Global Change, Third Edition (2014)
- Yentsch-Schindler Early Career Award, Association for the Sciences of Limnology and Oceanography (2013)
- Thomas Langford Lectureship, Duke University (2010)
- Outstanding Postdoctoral Mentor Award, Duke University Postdoctoral Association (2008)
- NSF CAREER Award for New Investigators (2005)
- Hynes Award for New Investigators from the Society for Freshwater Science (2004)

== Publications ==
=== Books ===
Biogeochemistry: An Analysis of Global Change, Third Edition

=== Selected journal articles ===
- Bernhardt, E.S., et al. 2005. Synthesizing US river restoration efforts. Science 308: 636–637
- Bernhardt, E.S. and Palmer, M.A., 2007. Restoring streams in an urbanizing world. Freshwater Biology, 52(4), pp. 738–751.
- Bernhardt, E.S., et al. 2007. Restoring rivers one reach at a time: results from a survey of US river restoration practitioners. Restoration Ecology, 15(3), pp. 482–493
- Bernhardt, E.S. and Palmer, M.A., 2011. River restoration: the fuzzy logic of repairing reaches to reverse catchment scale degradation. Ecological applications, 21(6), pp. 1926–1931.

Emily Bernhardt publications indexed by Google Scholar

== Personal life ==
Bernhardt is married and has two children.
