= Emily Stanley =

American professor of limnology

- Born: Bethlehem, Pennsylvania
- Education: Arizona State University, Ph.D.
- Awards: ASLO Hutchinson Award (2018)
- Scientific career
- Fields: Limnology, ecosystem ecology
- Thesis: Ecosystem expansion and contraction in streams
- Doctoral advisor: Stuart Fischer

Emily Stanley is an American professor of limnology at the University of Wisconsin–Madison. She was named a 2018 Ecological Society of America Fellow and her research focuses on the ecology of freshwater ecosystems.

== Early life and education ==
Emily Stanley was born in Bethlehem, Pennsylvania to parents Frank and Elizabeth. She has three siblings: Jonathan, Elizabeth, and James. Emily Stanley received her B.S. in biology at Yale University in 1984, her M.S. in biology at Southwest Texas State University in 1986, and her Ph.D. in zoology at Arizona State University in 1993. Her Ph.D. advisor was Stuart Fisher, a professor emeritus at the School of Life Sciences at Arizona State University.

== Career and research ==
After completing her Ph.D., Stanley worked as a postdoctoral research assistant at the University of Alabama for two years, then was associate professor at Oklahoma State University in the zoology department for three years. In 1998 she became associate professor at the University of Wisconsin Center for Limnology and Department of Integrative Biology. In 2010, she was promoted to Full Professor.

Stanley's research focuses on limnology, as well as river and stream ecosystem ecology. Her Ph.D. thesis studied a stream in the Arizona Sonoran Desert to determine how the different parts of the streams dried during warmer months, and it was determined that when each part of the stream ecosystem shrinks and expands, the stream as a whole fluctuates in size. According to her paper, this research could help predict how drying patterns cause changes in ecosystems, and knowing that stream ecosystems change over space and time can also be used to predict how streams could change due to climate change.

Other research of hers includes studying the effects of dam removal on ecosystems and predicting how best to manage the consequences. She has also researched how different factors such as hydrology, biochemistry, invasive species, and human land-use alter lakes and rivers. Changes in freshwater ecosystems, according to her research, can affect services humans get from these ecosystems, such as drinking water. Emily Stanley has also studied riparian zones, which are the areas between rivers and land, and how human impacts can change these ecosystems. In addition, she has studied hyporheic zones, areas where surface water mixes with groundwater, and researched how water and nutrients are exchanged between the two.

== Awards and honors ==
- 2003-2005 – University of Wisconsin Vilas Associate Award
- 2003-2008 – University of Wisconsin Vilas Associate Award
- 2006 – Aldo Leopold Leadership Program
- 2008 – University of Wisconsin Romnes Faculty Fellowship Award
- 2015 – University of Wisconsin Kellett Mid-Career Faculty Researcher Award
- 2018 – Fellow of the Society for Freshwater Science
- 2018 – ASLO G. Evelyn Hutchinson Award
- 2018 – Fellow of the Ecological Society of America

== Notable publications ==
1997: "Ecosystem expansion and contraction in streams," BioScience

1998: "The functional significance of the hyporheic zone in streams and rivers," Annual Review of Ecology and Systematics

2002: "Landscape indicators of human impacts to riverine systems," Aquatic Sciences

2003: "Trading off: the ecological effects of dam removal," Frontiers in Ecology and the Environment

2011: "State of the world's freshwater ecosystems: physical, chemical, and biological changes," Annual Review of Environment and Resources
