= Alonso Ramírez (ecologist) =

Costa Rican ecologist

- Born: Luis Alonso Ramírez Ulate
- Education: National University of Costa Rica (B.S), University of Georgia (M.Sc, Ph.D)
- Known for: Tropical stream ecology
- Scientific career
- Fields: Ecology, Limnology
- Workplaces: North Carolina State University University of Puerto Rico
- Thesis: Control of benthic assemblages in detritus-based tropical streams (2000)
- Doctoral advisor: Catherine Pringle

Luiz Alonso Ramírez Ulate is a Costa Rican ecologist and a professor at North Carolina State University. From 2020 to 2021 he served as president of the Society for Freshwater Science.

== Early life and education ==
Ramírez grew up in Costa Rica and has stated that even as a child, he was "fascinated" with dragonflies. He attended the National University of Costa Rica as an undergraduate, performing research in stream ecology and writing a thesis about dragonfly nymphs. Ramírez conducted ecological fieldwork at the La Selva Biological Station in Costa Rica, including during graduate school as a masters and doctoral student working with Catherine Pringle. Papers from his graduate research on macroinvertebrate community structure and decomposition in Costa Rican streams have each been cited over 150 times by other scientists. At the same time as he was conducting this work, he published a taxonomic checklist of Odonate species in Costa Rica with two colleagues.

== Research and career ==
Ramírez was hired as an assistant professor at the University of Puerto Rico in 2001; in 2018, he moved to North Carolina State University. He also served as Director of the El Verde Field Station for 15 years. Ramírez's research focuses on freshwater invertebrates, particularly in natural and urban tropical streams in Puerto Rico, Costa Rica, Mexico, and elsewhere. He is a leading voice in the discussion of tropical streams ecology. He has also continued his work on the taxonomy, morphology, and traits of freshwater macroinvertebrates, broadening the scope of this work from dragonflies in Costa Rica to aquatic insects throughout Latin America.

Ramírez has continued some collaboration with colleagues from the University of Georgia, including Pringle, Amy Rosemond, and Judy Meyer. For example, together they published research combining observational and experimental laboratory and field approaches to show that natural gradients in phosphorus availability alter organic matter decomposition by microbial communities in tropical streams. Ramírez has also contributed to globally coordinated efforts to understand the drivers of organic matter decomposition across biomes.

Much of Ramírez's work focuses on the effects of urbanization, disturbance, and extreme weather events on tropical stream community structure and function. Ramírez and his colleagues showed that urbanization depletes macroinvertebrate diversity in tropical streams, leading to reduced rates of organic matter decomposition. After a severe drought in 2015, Ramírez and colleagues showed that streams in Luquillo Experimental Forest underwent drying and became intermittent, leading to anoxic conditions and altering invertebrate communities. After Hurricane Maria in 2017, R and colleagues found that Puerto Rico's native fish were unaffected by flooding, while non-native fish were washed away or killed by debris.

Ramírez founded a network of Latin American freshwater scientists, Macrolatinos@, in 2012. Before being elected the president of the Society for Freshwater Science, Ramírez had served the society in multiple other roles, including on its Graduate Resources Committee, its International Coordination Committee, and its Latin American chapter. He is also a member of the editorial board of the journals Freshwater Science and Neotropical Biodiversity.
