= Eugene Odum =

American biologist and systems ecologist (1913–2002)

Eugene Pleasants Odum
- Born: September 17, 1913; Newport, New Hampshire, US
- Died: August 10, 2002 (aged 88); Athens, Georgia, US
- Education: University of Illinois (Ph.D.)
- Known for: pioneering the concept of the ecosystem; the interdependence of divergent ecosystems as the basis of how the earth functions
- Father: Howard W. Odum
- Relatives: Howard T. Odum (brother)
- Awards: Tyler Prize for Environmental Achievement (1977); Crafoord Prize (1987)
- Scientific career
- Fields: ecologist, mathematician, natural philosopher, and systems ecologist
- Workplaces: University of Georgia

Eugene Pleasants Odum (September 17, 1913 – August 10, 2002) was an American biologist at the University of Georgia known for his pioneering work on ecosystem ecology. He and his brother Howard T. Odum wrote the popular ecology textbook, Fundamentals of Ecology (1953). The Odum School of Ecology is named in his honor.

== Biography ==
Son of the sociologist Howard W. Odum, and older brother of the ecologist Howard T. Odum, E.P. Odum credited his father for imparting a holistic approach to exploring subjects. When contemplating where to conduct his advanced graduate work, he rejected both the University of Michigan and Cornell University, as he did not feel that this holism was embodied in their approach to their biology departments.

Instead, he chose the Graduate Department of Zoology at the University of Illinois, where he earned his doctorate degree. There Odum was a student of Victor Shelford, whose efforts led to the establishment of The Nature Conservancy.

After getting his Ph.D. in 1939, Odum was hired to be the first resident biologist at the Edmund Niles Huyck Preserve and Biological Research Station, in Rensselaerville, New York. The 430-acre preserve had been founded in 1931 and its research station established in 1938. The Preserve's first summer research fellows, also selected in 1939, were Edward C. Raney and Donald Griffin.

== Marriage and family ==
Odum and Martha Ann Huff, whom he had met as a student, married at her home in Wilmette, Illinois, on November 18, 1939. She continued her work as an artist. Odum was very proud of Martha's accomplishments as an artist. She often painted landscapes when traveling with her husband across the US and overseas. Martha Ann Odum joined her husband in Rensselaerville, where he continued to work at the Huyck Preserve. His research included studying chickadees and—more important for his future as an ecologist—inventorying the plants and preparing a habitat map. His purpose was to establish a basis for succession studies of the land so man could plan and manage ecosystems. He and Martha had two sons, William Eugene and Daniel Thomas Odum. Their son William died in 1991 at the age of 48, but had already made important contributions to science while a faculty member at the University of Virginia. In 1995 a paper attributed to William E. Odum, together with his father and uncle, suggested the paradigm of pulsed ecosystems.

== Academic career at University of Georgia ==
In September 1940, Odum took a job as an instructor of biology at the University of Georgia (Athens, Georgia). In the late 1940s, while serving on the university's biology faculty committee, which was then drawing up a new curriculum, he concluded there was an urgent need to incorporate the subject of ecology, since he learned that his colleagues generally did not know what ecology (in its own right) might be. He founded the Institute of Ecology, later named for him.

In 2007 the Institute of Ecology, which Odum founded at the University of Georgia, was named as the Odum School of Ecology, the first stand-alone academic unit of a research university dedicated to ecology. Odum also founded two field research stations as a faculty member at the University of Georgia: the University of Georgia Marine Institute and the Savannah River Ecology Lab.

== Work ==
=== Ecosystems ===
In the 1940s and 1950s, "ecology" was not yet a field of study that had been defined as a separate discipline. Even professional biologists seemed to Odum to be generally under-educated about how the Earth's ecological systems interact with one another. Odum brought forward the importance of ecology as a discipline that should be a fundamental dimension of the training of a biologist.

Odum adopted and developed further the term "ecosystem". Although sometimes said to have been coined by Raymond Lindeman in 1942, the term "ecosystem" first appeared in a 1935 publication by the British ecologist, Arthur Tansley, and had in 1930 been coined by Tansley's colleague, Arthur Roy Clapham. Before Odum, the ecology of specific organisms and environments had been studied on a more limited scale within individual sub-disciplines of biology. Many scientists doubted that it could be studied on a large scale, or as a discipline in itself.

Odum wrote a textbook on ecology with his brother, Howard Thomas Odum, a graduate student at Yale. The Odum brothers' book (first edition, 1953), Fundamentals of Ecology, was the only textbook in the field for about ten years. Among other things, the Odums explored how one natural system can interact with another.

=== Environmentalism ===
While Odum did wish to influence the knowledge base and thinking of fellow biologists and of college and university students, his historical role was not as a promoter of public environmentalism as we now know it. However, his dedication in his 1963 book, Ecology, expressed that his father had inspired him to "seek more harmonious relationships between man and nature".

By 1970, when the first Earth Day was organized, Odum's conception of the living Earth as a global set of interlaced ecosystems became one of the key insights of the environmental movement that has since spread through the world. He was, however, an independent thinker who was at times, gently critical of the slogans and fashionable concepts of the environmentalist movement.

=== Legacy ===
Odum's will stipulated that, after his death, his 26 acres (110,000 m^{2}) on the Middle Oconee River in Athens, Ga. would be sold and developed according to plans he laid out before his death. He would often show friends and colleagues hand sketched plans for his vision of this green community. Plans included that over 50 percent of the property would be protected greenspace and walking trails, managed by the Oconee River Land Trust. Profits from the sale of the land would go to the Eugene and William Odum Ecology Fund, after $1 million is set aside for a professorial chair at UGA in Odum's name. The land was sold to builder John Willis Homes who is honoring Odum's wishes at Beech Creek Preserve.

Odum's financial contributions were focused on not only the University of Georgia, but also the University of Virginia given his son's faculty appointment there, and the University of North Carolina where his father was a prolific scholar. Ultimately, his wealth—partly the product of book royalties—benefited those institutions that he respected. The Ecological Society of America offers the Eugene P. Odum Award for Excellence in Ecology Education, which was endowed by, and named for, Odum.

== Publications ==
Books

- Odum, Eugene P. (1939). Variations in the heart rate of birds: a study in physiological ecology. Champaign-Urbana: University of Illinois (diss.). OCLC 703669172.

see also: Odum, Eugene P. (1941). "Variations in the heart rate of birds: a study in physiological ecology". Ecological Monographs. 11 (3): 299–326. Bibcode:1941EcoM...11..299O. doi:10.2307/1943206. JSTOR 1943206.

- —— (1953). Fundamentals of Ecology. Philadelphia / London: W.B. Saunders Cy.
- 1963. Ecology
- 1975. Ecology, the link between the natural and the social sciences
- 1983. Basic Ecology
- 1993. Ecology and Our Endangered Life Support Systems
- 1998. Ecological Vignettes: Ecological Approaches to Dealing with Human Predicament
- 2000. Essence of Place (co-authored with Martha Odum)

Articles, a selection

- 1969. The Strategy of Ecosystem Development
- Comparison of population energy flow of a herbivorous and a deposit-feeding invertebrate in a salt marsh ecosystem (with Alfred E. Smalley)

About Odum

- Rotabi, K. S. (2008). Ecological theory origin from natural to social science or vice versa? : A brief conceptual history for social work. Advances in Social Work, 8 (1), 113–123. (Online)
- Craige, Betty Jean (2001). Eugene Odum : ecosystem ecologist and environmentalist. Athens, Ga. [u.a.]: Univ. of Georgia Press. ISBN 0-8203-2281-4.
