= Ashley Moerke =

American ecologist

- Education: University of Minnesota Duluth (B.S.), University of Notre Dame (M.S., Ph.D.)
- Scientific career
- Workplaces: Lake Superior State University

Ashley H. Moerke is an American ecologist and a professor at Lake Superior State University. Her research focuses on freshwater ecosystem management, especially around the Great Lakes. Moerke advises local and state governments and bi-national commissions on water science, fisheries, and other environmental issues. In 2020, she was chosen as president-elect of the Society for Freshwater Science.

== Education and early career ==
Moerke completed her Ph.D. in biology from the University of Notre Dame in 2004, after completing a master's degree at the same institution in 2000. Her graduate research was supervised by Gary Lamberti and focused on stream restoration. Moerke's research revealed complex impacts of restoration interventions, which in some cases led to a lack of desired changes in species assemblages. Moerke also highlighted that post-intervention monitoring is often neglected in restoration projects, and advocated for restoration approaches that explicitly consider human impacts at different spatial scales. Moerke's doctoral work received the President's Award from the North American Benthological Society.

== Career ==
Moerke became an assistant professor at Lake Superior State University in 2004. She has won multiple teaching awards, and developed a service-based course on stream restoration in which students worked with a local conservation district on projects. In addition to her position as a professor in the School of Natural Resources and the Environment, Moerke was also the co-director of its Aquatic Research lab and is now the director of the university's Center for Freshwater Research and Education.

The St. Mary's River, deemed a Great Lakes Area of Concern due to its degraded environmental status, has served as the site of much of Moerke's research. Moerke has studied zooplankton, Lake Sturgeon, and Atlantic salmon in the river, as well as physical conditions such as sediment quality. This included contributing to a 2010 assessment of the river's biology and hydrology for the U.S. Army Corps of Engineers, concluding that ongoing shifts in the biological community had the potential to drastically alter the ecosystem if they continued. In 2015, she performed a baseline documentation of the Little Rapids section of the river for the Great Lakes Commission and the Michigan Department of Environmental Quality. Moerke has also documented the positive effects of restoration on that section of the river, such as increased abundance and diversity of fish and benthic macroinvertebrates.

In parallel, Moerke has studied the ecology of fishes in Great Lakes tributaries, including the interaction between non-native, stocked Pacific salmon and native Brook trout, and the way that salmon transport pollutants in their bodies to their spawning grounds. Moerke's collaborations have revealed that the effects of these salmon on primary producers and nutrient dynamics in areas where they have been introduced differs from effects on stream ecology in their home ranges in the Pacific Northwest of North America.

Moerke has worked to develop metrics and indices of the biological condition of wetlands in the Great Lakes region as well as assessing invasive species in the wetlands.

In 2011, Moerke edited a special issue of the Journal of Great Lakes Research devoted to the ecology of the St. Mary's River. Moerke was the lead author on a chapter of the textbook Methods in Stream Ecology.

Moerke has served as a scientific advisor to state and local governments, including on Michigan's Water Quality Advisory Committee. In 2018, Michigan Governor Rick Snyder appointed her to the nine-member Environmental Science Advisory Board of Michigan's Department of Technology, Management, and Budget, and she is also an advisor to the Great Lakes Fisheries Commission.

In 2020, she was chosen for a three-year term on the Society for Freshwater Science's Executive Committee (one year each as President-Elect, President, and Past President) after previously serving in various roles for the society and its academic journal, Freshwater Science.

== Awards ==
- Distinguished Professor, Lake Superior State University (2012)
- Distinguished Professor of the Year, Michigan Association of State Universities (2014)
- Justin W. Leonard Award of Excellence, Michigan chapter of the American Fisheries Society (2020)
