= Nancy Grimm =

American ecosystem ecologist

- Education: Hampshire College (BA); Arizona State University (MS, PhD)
- Known for: stream ecology, urban ecology, biogeochemistry, sustainability
- Awards: American Geophysical Union Fellow; Ecological Society of America Fellow; AAAS Fellow; Society for Freshwater Science Fellow; National Academy of Sciences member
- Scientific career
- Workplaces: Arizona State University
- Website: http://www.grimm.lab.asu.edu/

Nancy B. Grimm is an American ecosystem ecologist and professor at Arizona State University. Grimm's substantial contributions to the understanding of urban and arid ecosystem biogeochemistry are recognized in her numerous awards. Grimm is an elected Fellow of the American Geophysical Union, Ecological Society of America, American Association for the Advancement of Science, and the Society for Freshwater Science. She is an elected member of the United States National Academy of Sciences.

== Early life and education ==
Grimm had no interest in pursuing a career or major in STEM, but rather something to do with foreign language. However, after her first class in ecology at Hampshire College she decided that she wanted to be an ecologist. Grimm received her Bachelor's degree in 1978 from Hampshire College in Massachusetts. Grimm earned her M.S. in 1980 and Ph.D. in 1985 from Arizona State University. Grimm acknowledges key mentors throughout her life: Stan Gregory for inspiration as an undergraduate student at Hampshire College, Steve Carpenter for providing access to new opportunities, and Jim Collins for his advice once she got to Arizona State.

== Research and career ==
Grimm has been at Arizona State University since 1978 and a member of the faculty since 1990. She is currently Regents Professor and Virginia M Ullman Professor of Ecology in the School of Life Sciences and Distinguished Global Futures Scholar in the Global Futures Lab. She was the director of the Central Arizona-Phoenix Long-Term Ecological Research Program for nearly two decades (1997-2016), which focuses on studying the social-ecological system of the metropolitan area of Phoenix. Currently, she directs a sustainability research network that looks into how urban areas respond to extreme weather events. Grimm and her research group primarily focus on urban and stream ecosystems, examining the effects of climate variation and change on ecosystem function. The success of Grimm's research program is evident in the more than $25 million in research funds she has secured from the National Science Foundation. This funding has allowed Grimm to carry out research that has enhanced the understanding of how ecosystems function in light of disturbance - whether that is the chronic disturbance of urbanization or how the variability of flow in a semi-arid streams and how these shifts affect the cycling of critical elements (e.g. nitrogen, carbon, and phosphorus).

Grimm is the former president of the Ecological Society of America (2005-2006) and the North American Benthological Society (1999-2000, now Society for Freshwater Science). In addition to her position at Arizona State, Grimm has worked as a program director for the National Science Foundation and has worked with the U.S. Global Change Research Program as a senior scientist. Grimm worked alongside 300 other scientific experts to write the National Climate Assessment in 2014. The National Climate Assessment is a publication which is referred to by the public, federal agencies, and the National Academy of Sciences to learn about the changes that have already occurred as a result of climate change as well as what is expected as a result of climate change in the future.

Grimm worked as the director of Arizona State University's Undergraduate Mentorship in Environmental Biology program between 1993 and 1998 in an effort to increase the number of students in underrepresented groups interested in ecology. During her time at Arizona State University, she has been the mentor of 42 graduate scholars, 29 post-doctoral scholars, and 41 undergraduate research scholars. She now co-directs a graduate scholars network, Earth Systems Science for the Anthropocene.

== Awards and recognition ==
Nancy received the Arizona State University Faculty Achievement Award for her research in 2010. She received this award because of her research about urban ecology and studies which focus on the clash between human interaction and the environmental response.

- Distinguished Ecologist, Colorado State University Graduate Program in Ecology, 2004
- Distinguished Ecologist, Utah State University Ecology Program, January 2003
- Founders’ Day Faculty Award for Excellence in Research, Arizona State University Alumni Association, 2010
- Inaugural Minshall Lecturer, Idaho State University, 2007
- Fellow, American Association for the Advancement of Science, 2008
- Distinguished Scientist Award, American Institute of Biological Sciences, 2011
- Director’s Award for Collaborative Integration, National Science Foundation, 2012
- Fellow, Ecological Society of America, 2012
- Eminent Ecologist, Kellogg Biological Station, June 2015
- Inaugural William Mitsch Lecturer, University of Notre Dame, October 2015
- Distinguished Ecologist, Marine Biological Laboratory Ecosystems Center, October 2015
- Jenner Lecturer, University of North Carolina, April 2015
- Eugene and Bill Odum Lecturer, University of Georgia, April 2015
- Fellow, American Geophysical Union, 2017
- Member, National Academy of Sciences, 2019
- Distinguished Lecturer, Yale University, Yale School of the Environment, September 2023

== Publications ==
Nancy Grimm has published over 250 peer reviewed publications and has been cited thousands of times. Below is a list of her top ten most cited articles (as of Fall 2026).

1. Global change and the ecology of cities
2. Global climate change impacts in the United States
3. Biogeochemical hot spots and hot moments at the interface of terrestrial and aquatic ecosystems
4. Integrated Approaches to Long-Term Studies of Urban Ecological Systems: Urban ecological systems present multiple challenges to ecologists—pervasive human impact and extreme heterogeneity of cities, and the need to integrate social and ecological approaches, concepts, and theory
5. Stream denitrification across biomes and its response to anthropogenic nitrate loading
6. Towards an ecological understanding of biological nitrogen fixation
7. Socioeconomics drive urban plant diversity
8. The changing landscape: ecosystem responses to urbanization and pollution across climatic and societal gradients
9. Advancing Urban Ecology toward a Science of Cities
10. Temporal succession in a desert stream ecosystem following flash flooding
