= Erin Hotchkiss =

American ecologist

Erin R. Hotchkiss
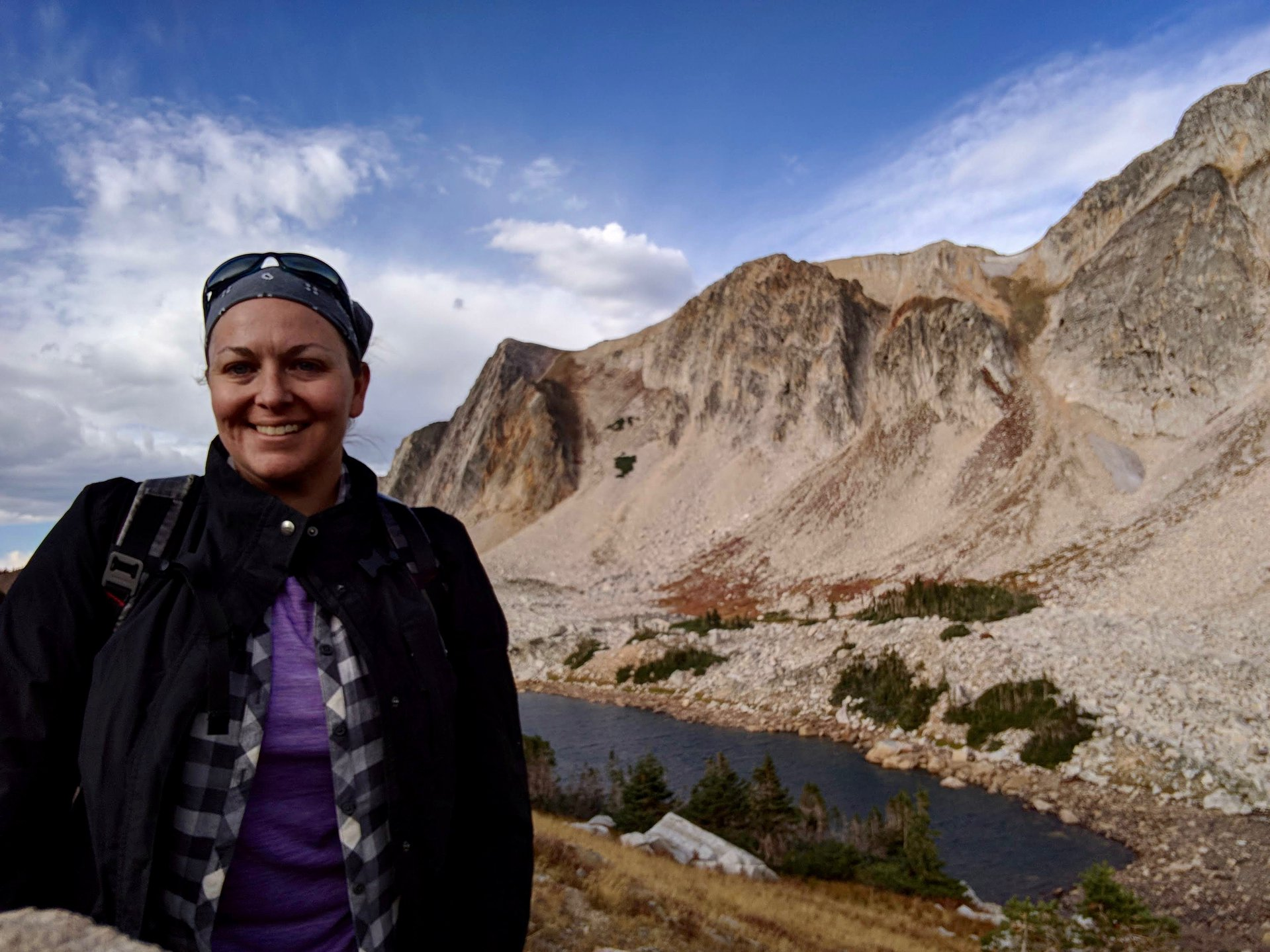
- Known for: Her work on climate change's effects on freshwater stream and river systems
- Awards: Hynes Award for New Investigators with Society for Freshwater Science (2016) and Raymond L. Lindeman Award from the Association for the Sciences of Limnology and Oceanography (2016)
- Scientific career
- Fields: Ecology
- Institutions: Assistant Professor of Biology at Virginia Tech
- Thesis: Impacts of exotic snails on stream carbon cycling
- Website: https://www.hotchkisslab.com

Erin Hotchkiss is an ecologist who studies climate change's specific impact on freshwater ecosystems (rivers, lakes, wetlands). She researches the relationships between organisms and water quality in freshwater ecosystems, how processes on land influence water, and the sources and fate of carbon and nutrients in aquatic ecosystems. Hotchkiss is currently an Assistant Professor in the Department of Biological Studies at Virginia Polytechnic Institute and State University.

== Early life and education ==
Hotchkiss was born in Washington D.C. but later moved to northern California and then Oak Ridge, Tennessee. Hotchkiss grew up playing outside with her favorite memories from childhood including the exploration of tide pools and the beach at low tide, curious to see what creatures were living there. Hotchkiss entered freshwater ecology connected to and inspired by water.

Hotchkiss earned her Bachelors in Science for Environmental Studies in 2003 from Emory University. In 2007, Hotchkiss went on to receive her masters in Zoology and Physiology from the University of Wyoming. Here, Hotchkiss wrote her thesis: Impacts of exotic snails on stream carbon cycling. Staying at the University of Wyoming in 2013, Hotchkiss earned her Ph.D. in ecology and her dissertation focused on carbon cycling in streams.

== Career ==
As a Postdoctoral Research Fellow from 2013 to 2015, Hotchkiss worked at Umeå University in Sweden, researching ecosystem metabolism and carbon emissions from river networks. From 2015 to 2016 Hotchkiss worked as a postdoctoral research fellow at the Université du Québec à Montréal, Canada. Here, Hotchkiss focused on the biogeochemistry of northern aquatic ecosystems. In 2016, Hotchkiss started at Virginia Polytechnic Institute and State University as an Assistant Professor of Biological Sciences.

== Research ==
Hotchkiss works to uncover the impacts of environmental change on freshwater ecosystems. She uses empirical data and models to measure carbon cycling in aquatic ecosystems. Much of her field work focuses on stream metabolism and the fate of terrestrial materials in freshwater. Hotchkiss combines her knowledge in her three fields of study: chemistry, biology, and hydrology to quantify environmental changes in freshwater.

Erin Hotchkiss has published many valuable scientific articles that have received awards and have been cited by others in her field. One of Hotchkiss' most notable articles from 2015 is entitled, Sources of and processes controlling CO_{2} emissions change with the size of streams and rivers. Her work uncovers the effect of CO_{2} emissions in different size streams and rivers and gives key evidence for carbon cycling in rivers. Hotchkiss examines the relationships between stream geometry, chemistry, and ecosystem metabolism. The process of stream metabolism includes such metrics as ecosystem respiration (ER), gross primary production (GPP), and their difference, net ecosystem production (NEP). This work found that CO_{2} emissions in small streams are mainly derived from terrestrial sources, while internal processing (i.e. stream metabolism) is a more important source of CO_{2} release within larger rivers. These findings are significant as they provide evidence of the importance of inland waterways and aquatic ecosystem metabolism within the global carbon cycle.

Some other of Hotchkiss' notable work includes:

- Hotchkiss, E.R.*, S. Sadro, & P.C. Hanson. 2018. Toward a more integrative perspective on carbon metabolism across lentic and lotic inland waters. Limnology & Oceanography
- Hotchkiss, E.R.* & R.O. Hall. 2015. Whole-stream 13C tracer addition reveals distinct fates of newly fixed carbon.
- Hotchkiss, E.R.* & R.O. Hall. 2014. High rates of daytime respiration in three streams: Use of δ18O2 and O2 to model diel ecosystem metabolism.

== Awards and honors ==
Erin Hotchkiss was recognized as a notable early career scientist with two awards:

- Hynes Award for New Investigators from the Society for Freshwater Science (2016)
- Raymond L. Lindeman Award from the Association for the Sciences of Limnology and Oceanography (2016)
