= Amy Rosemond =

American ecologist

- Education: University of North Carolina at Chapel Hill (B.S., M.A.), Vanderbilt University (PhD)
- Known for: Ecosystem ecology, Biogeochemistry
- Scientific career
- Workplaces: University of Georgia

Amy D. Rosemond is an American aquatic ecosystem ecologist, biogeochemist, and Distinguished Research Professor at the Odum School of Ecology at the University of Georgia. Rosemond studies how global change affects freshwater ecosystems, including effects of watershed urbanization, nutrient pollution, and changes in biodiversity on ecosystem function. She was elected an Ecological Society of America fellow in 2018, and served as president of the Society for Freshwater Science from 2019-2020.

== Education and early career ==
Rosemond grew up in Florida in the 1970s, where her love of nature was confronted by increasing human pressures on the environment. Rosemond earned her Bachelor of Sciences degree in zoology from the University of North Carolina, Chapel Hill. She remained at the University of North Carolina, Chapel Hill to complete her Master of Arts degree in biology.

Rosemond went on to earn a Ph.D. in biology at Vanderbilt University, where she was co-advised by Vanderbilt faculty Susan Brawley and Oak Ridge National Laboratory research scientist Patrick J. Mulholland. Rosemond conducted her dissertation research at the Oak Ridge National Lab, in Tennessee, USA, studying how both top-down predation and bottom-up nutrient availability affect periphyton in headwater streams.

After completing her Ph.D. in 1993, Rosemond was awarded a National Science Foundation postdoctoral research fellowship in environmental biology. She completed her postdoc at the Institute of Ecology at the University of Georgia, during which she conducted research at La Selva Biological Station in Costa Rica examining the top-down and bottom-up effects of predatory fishes and shrimps and phosphorus, respectively, on leaf-litter breakdown and carbon processing. While working at La Selva, Rosemond also conducted research on landscape-scale variation in stream phosphorus concentrations, and its effects on stream detritivore food webs.

== Career ==
Rosemond worked as the assistant director of the Institute of Ecology at the University of Georgia from 1998-2005. She became an assistant professor at the University of Georgia in 2005 in the Odum School of Ecology, an associate professor in 2011, and a professor in 2017. As of 2019, she has advised or co-advised 17 graduate students and three postdocs at Georgia. Broadly, Rosemond and her lab members research the mechanisms and processes that underlie aquatic ecosystem health and function, and seek to understand how stream and river health is altered by human activities and global change. This involves studying how different stressors, including excess nutrients and land-use change through urbanization, affect ecosystem processes.

=== Excess nutrients and stream ecosystem function ===
Leveraging partnerships with the Coweeta Hydrologic Lab long-term ecological research site, Rosemond and her colleagues have used whole-ecosystem experiments to understand how stream carbon stocks, benthic macroinvertebrates, and higher trophic levels, including salamanders, respond to nitrogen and phosphorus pollution. Her research in this area focuses on how terrestrially-derived detrital carbon, including leaves, sticks, and wood that fall into streams, is processed and transmitted through aquatic food webs that are exposed to excess nutrients. She has led research to test the relative importance of nitrogen and phosphorus limitation in stream carbon processing through whole-stream nutrient enrichment studies. Through this work, Rosemond and her collaborators have increased understanding of how nutrients affect energy flow in detritus-based food webs, as previous research on nutrient effects in streams often focused on photosynthetic, algal pathways.

== Awards ==
- Distinguished Research Professor, University of Georgia (2022)
- Fellow of the Ecological Society of America (2018)
- Creative Research Medal in Natural Sciences and Engineering, University of Georgia Office of Research (2018)
- National Science Foundation Postdoctoral Fellowship in Environmental Biology

== Publications ==
=== Selected journal articles ===
- Rosemond, A.D., et al. 2015. Experimental nutrient additions accelerate terrestrial carbon loss from stream ecosystems. Science 347: 1142-1145.
- Rosemond, A.D., et al. 2010. Non-additive effects of litter mixing are suppressed in a nutrient-enriched stream. Oikos 119: 326-336.
- Rosemond, A.D., et al. 2008. Nitrogen versus phosphorus demand in a detritus-based headwater stream: what drives microbial to ecosystem response? Verhandlungen des Internationalen Verein Limnologie. 30: 651-655.
- Rosemond, A.D., et al. 2002. Landscape variation in phosphorus concentration and effects on detritus-based tropical streams. Limnology and Oceanography 47: 278-289.
- Rosemond, A.D., et al. 1993. Top-down and bottom-up control of stream periphyton: effects of nutrients and herbivores. Ecology 74: 1264-1280.
