= Stream ecology =

Stream ecology is the scientific study of the aquatic species, their interactions with one another, and their connection with the biological, chemical, and physical processes from multiple dimensions within streams. Streams display great variability in their force and generate spatial and temporal gradients in abiotic and biotic activities. The physical structure of stream networks show headwater systems behave different from mid-lower order systems with mean annual discharge, channel size, alluvial habitat and contributing area all key factors.

== Importance ==
Streams along with lakes, rivers, and wetlands within protected areas were viewed as an afterthought. However, freshwater aquatic ecosystems such as streams are connected by flowing water that changes on a spatial and temporal scale. Streams (as well as rivers), are crucial part of the many past and current characteristics of cities, and potentially any future. Early settlements and the development of cities were around streams as they provide many services such as: transportation, commerce, recreation, water supply, and much more. Therefore, there has been a shift in research from biophysical structure of stream ecosystems to their functional properties.

Streams carry sediments and nutrients into rivers, lakes, and subsequently into oceans.

=== Understanding streams ===
Streams have two primary functions: transporting water from higher elevations to lower elevations; and to transport sediment. A healthy stream would have an equal amount of sediment being picked up and moved downstream and sediment being deposited in the stream. This may also result in healthy lakes, rivers, and estuaries. Excess deposition in stream can lead to mid-channel sediments bars. Excess channel erosion can result in rapid deepening or widening of the stream channel, all of which effect stream ecosystem functions and services. They also provide essential servies to their aquatic life and associated organisms such as horses, who may depend on the stream for drinking water, or fish who depend on them for habitat. Therefore, stream ecosystems cannot be studied in isolation.

Streams are dynamic and therefore produce a lot of energy. This occurs due to their movement of water and sediment through a stream system. "The faster the stream flows, the greate the power it has to erode and carry sediment." A way a stream can dissipate this energy of flowing water is by altering their flow pattern or meandering by forming curves along the distance the flow travels. Therefore, it is normal for stream channels to move slowly over time. Riparian zones are equally important in streams as the deep or densely rooted, water-loving plants in this zone along the stream channel add another layer of protection to this energy.

=== Communities ===
Microbial communities in stream ecosystems are the trophic foundation, playing a large role in nutrient turnover and recycling. The discharge and velocity of a stream typically determines the species (especially algal) that occupy a system. Prokaryotes and eukaryotes decompose organic matter and are consumed by other organisms at a higher trophic level. Together, the productive of these microbial communities represent the overall productivity of stream ecosystems. Other organisms inhabit stream ecosystems such as: plants, aquatic insects, fungi, fish, mammals, and much more.

=== The riparian zone ===
The area alongside a stream covered in vegetation is called the riparian zone. The vegetation that thrive are dependent on the geologic location of the stream such as the continent, climate, stream hydrology, etc. These zones contribute nutrients, shade, organic materials, habitats, protection for stream, and much more.

== Human impacts ==
=== Urbanization ===
The field of urban stream ecology has evolved rapidly over the past thirty years, showcasing the growing need to set regulations and spread educational resources on streams. However, with increasing urban development this has resulted in alteration in stream systems such as their catchment land cover and flow paths, riparian zones, channels, et cetera, bringing devastation to their natural ecosystem structures and functions.

Urbanization replaces natural landscapes with impermeable surfaces such as roads. As urbanization spreads to rural areas and people are leaving inner city living, infrastructure demand rises and natural spaces are being removed. One of the most detrimental effects has been the introduction of complex chemical mixtures of contaminants and nutrients into natural ecosystems, including streams. This typically leads to excess nutrient levels in these systems, most notably nitrogen and phosphorus.

==== Chemical and biogeochemical processes ====
There are many different hydrological and biogeochemical processes that work separately or in tandem to contribute to nitrogren and phosphorus removal. Common processes occurring in stream ecosystems include: denitrification, nitrification, sediment retention, assimilation, and adsorption, among other processes.

==== Freshwater salinization ====
Freshwater salinization is a growing threat to urban streams, watersheds, and other sources of freshwater, primarily due to freshwater salinization syndrome. A major driver in the mobilization of salts, nutrients, and metals are anthropogenic factors such as road salting, sewage systems, and the addition of impervious surfaces.

== Stream restoration ==
A large reason for stream restoration is to remove nitrogren and phosphorus pollution. Excess nitrogen and phosphorus from anthropogenic activities have partaken in stream and river quality concerns such as drinking water contamination, hypoxia, and algal blooms. There are different approaches one may take to offset these effects. However, the approach used will vary based on the stream ecosystem in question.

It is also important to note that implementing projects do not only produce positive outcomes. There are many trade-offs and co-benefits that arise with each approach.

=== Floodplain reconnection ===
Employed to attempt to influence water quality by slowing down stream flow via reconnection of a stream to its floodplain. This approach works best in locations where excess stormwater can temporarily be stored in the floodplain, reducing peak flows and therefore improving nutrient processing such as denitrificaition. However, a limitation is that is may deteriorate over time due to erosion, failure of restoration features, or even by not keeping maintenance of the site.

=== Streambed (hyporheic) reconnection ===
This approach targets the reconnection of the stream to its hyporheic zone. It aims to improve water exchange between the stream and the hyporheic zone. Therefore, it works best when there is a need to increase nutrient processing, enhance water quality, or even slow down water flow, allowing for more interaction between the zones. However, a limitation is that there can be less effectiveness in urban areas due to having more impermeable surfaces and less space to implement reconnection.

=== Increasing stream surface area ===
This includes changing a stream's morphology by adding features to the stream such as meanders, step pools, oxbows, et cetera, to create more surface area for nutrient processes and interaction. Similar to the streambed reconnection approach, a limitation is a lack of space to implement it effectively. However, it works best when wanting to facilitate biological interactions, sediment trapping, nutrient uptake, et cetera, to improve nutrient processes.

=== Stormwater management ===
This approach entails infrastructure that can slow down stormwater so it can infiltrate, and reduce flashy flows and nutrient loads. Therefore, it is best implemented for long-term goals and planning, as the time for a stream to recover following stormwater construction projects can vary and may take several years. It does aim to mitigate the negative impacts of storm flow/runoff on stream health. However, a limitation to this approach is that existing infrastructure can complicate it. Thus, there could be contaminated water and it can be costly.

=== Increasing the surface area of wetlands ===
This approach aims to increase the area of wetlands through restoration or creation, since wetlands are highly effective at retaining nutrients. For instance, creating wetlands within the stream channel can increase the retention of nutrients. Wetlands can also store floodwaters and filter nutrients before they enter streams. Therefore, it is best to be considered when you want to create a type of buffer zone to enhance nutrient processes. A limitation to this approach is that wetlands can dry out or suffer from degradation if in-stream features or hydrologic connectivity is not maintained.
