= Vincent H. Resh =

American entomologist (born 1945)

- Born: 1945 (age 80–81)
- Citizenship: US
- Education: Georgetown University; Niagara University; University of Louisville
- Partner: Cheryl Resh
- Children: 1
- Scientific career
- Institutions: Ball State University; University of California, Berkeley

Vincent H. Resh (born 1945) is an American entomologist who primarily researches aquatic insects and medical entomology. He was the co-editor of the Annual Review of Entomology from 1991 to 1997.

== Early life and education ==
Vincent H. Resh was born in 1945. Resh grew up in New York and attended Iona Preparatory School. His father, Lewis J. Resh, worked for John Lowry, Inc. in New York City. His mother's name was Ann. He attended Georgetown University for his bachelor's degree, graduating in 1967. He then attended Niagara University for his master's degree in 1969 and the University of Louisville for his PhD in 1973.

== Career ==
Resh's first teaching appointment was as an assistant professor at Ball State University, where he worked from 1973 to 1975. He then accepted an assistant professorship at the University of California, Berkeley in 1975. He was made an associate professor in 1979 and a full professor in 1984. From 2007 to 2008 he was the chair of the Division of Organisms and the Environment within Berkeley's Department of Environmental Science. He was the director of the Richard B. Gump South Pacific Biological Research Station at Mo'orea from 1996 to 2001. His research is primarily focused on the evolutionary biology and ecology of aquatic insects invertebrates like insects, crustaceans, and molluscs. He also researches how humans can modify or influence aquatic environments to control aquatic disease vectors and how aquatic invertebrate community composition can be used as a proxy for water quality.

For fifteen years, he served on the World Health Organization's River Blindness Control Program. He was the president of the North American Benthological Society from 1983 to 1984, on the board of trustees of the Marine Science Institute from 1992 to 1997, and co-editor of the Annual Review of Entomology from 1991 to 1997. Resh was also one of the editors of the 2003 Encyclopedia of Insects, which was awarded the Most Outstanding Single-Volume Reference in Science by the Association of American Publishers and Best of Reference by the New York Public Library and Library Journal.

== Awards and honors ==
He was elected as a fellow of the California Academy of Sciences in 1995, and the University of Lyon gave him an honorary doctor in 2009. In 2017 he was one of the inaugural fellows of the Society for Freshwater Science.
