= Jennifer Tank =

American ecologist

Jennifer Leah Tank
- Education: Michigan State University; Virginia Tech
- Scientific career
- Workplaces: University of Notre Dame; University of Illinois at Urbana–Champaign; Oak Ridge National Laboratory
- Thesis: Microbial activity on wood in streams: Exploring abiotic and biotic factors affecting the structure and function of wood biofilms. (1996)

Jennifer L. Tank is an American ecologist who is the Galla Professor of Ecology of Streams and Rivers at the University of Notre Dame. Her research considers the biogeochemistry of streams, the influence of agriculture on land conservation, stream restoration and stream transport. She was elected Fellow of the American Association for the Advancement of Science in 2020.

== Early life and education ==
Tank was raised beside the shores of the Great Lakes. Her parents were biology teachers. She was an undergraduate student at Michigan State University, where she studied zoology. She earned her master's and doctoral degree at Virginia Tech, where she switched focus to ecology. Her master's research considered microbial respiration on decaying leaves and sticks in an Appalachian stream. Her doctoral research involved investigations into the microbial activity of wood biofilms in streams. Tank was a postdoctoral researcher at the Oak Ridge National Laboratory.

== Research and career ==
In 1998 Tank was made an Assistant Professor of Environmental Science at the University of Illinois at Urbana–Champaign. She joined the University of Notre Dame in 2000, where she was made Assistant, Associate and eventually full Professor. She was elected Director of the Notre Dame Environmental Change Initiative in 2016. As part of her leadership, Tank is responsible for the Indiana Watershed Initiative, which explores how conservation practises serve to protect freshwater. She was elected President of the Society for Freshwater Science in 2017.

== Awards and honours ==
- 2013 Appointed Leopold Leadership Fellow from the Stanford Woods Institute for the Environment
- 2014 Elected Fellow of the John J. Reilly Center for Science
- 2016 Ganey Faculty Community-Based Research Research Award
- 2018 Notre Dame Media Legend
- 2019 Hoosier Resilience Hero from the Environmental Resilience Institute
- 2019 Association for Sciences of Limnology and Oceanography Ruth Patrick Award
- 2020 Elected Fellow of the American Association for the Advancement of Science
- 2020 Elected Fellow of the Society for Freshwater Science

== Selected publications ==
- Peterson, B. J. (2001-04-06). "Control of Nitrogen Export from Watersheds by Headwater Streams". Science. 292 (5514): 86–90. Bibcode:2001Sci...292...86P. doi:10.1126/science.1056874. ISSN 0036-8075. PMID 11292868. S2CID 15644843.
- Mulholland, Patrick J.; Helton, Ashley M.; Poole, Geoffrey C.; Hall, Robert O.; Hamilton, Stephen K.; Peterson, Bruce J.; Tank, Jennifer L.; Ashkenas, Linda R.; Cooper, Lee W.; Dahm, Clifford N.; Dodds, Walter K. (2008). "Stream denitrification across biomes and its response to anthropogenic nitrate loading". Nature. 452 (7184): 202–205. Bibcode:2008Natur.452..202M. doi:10.1038/nature06686. hdl:1912/2425. ISSN 1476-4687. PMID 18337819. S2CID 4377548.
- Tank, Jennifer L.; Rosi-Marshall, Emma J.; Griffiths, Natalie A.; Entrekin, Sally A.; Stephen, Mia L. (2010-03-01). "A review of allochthonous organic matter dynamics and metabolism in streams". Journal of the North American Benthological Society. 29 (1): 118–146. doi:10.1899/08-170.1. ISSN 0887-3593. S2CID 54609464.
