= Nancy Tuchman =

American ecologist

- Born: January 17, 1958 (age 68)
- Education: Ph.D. University of Louisville M.S. Central Michigan University
- Awards: Expanded Reason Award, Pope Benedict XVI Foundation (2017); Honorary PhD Recipient and Commencement Speaker, Central MI University (2014); Chicago Magazine's Green Award (2013)
- Scientific career
- Fields: aquatic ecology, global change, invasive species
- Website: https://www.luc.edu/biology/tuchman.shtml

Nancy Tuchman (born January 17, 1958) is an American environmental scientist, educator, and activist. She specializes on human impacts on aquatic ecosystem function, with a focus on coastal Great Lake ecosystems. Tuchman is dedicated to raising public awareness about issues of global climate change and education. Her dedication is shown through her thirty years of educating students in environmental sciences at Loyola University Chicago. In 2013 she founded the Institute of Environmental Sustainability on Loyola University's campus - which later became the School of Environmental Sustainability in late 2020 - and is a driver of environmental change and progress in the Chicago area.

== Early life and education ==
Tuchman grew up in Ann Arbor, Michigan where she was raised for a love of the outdoors by two amateur ecologist parents. Time spent in nature, exploring streams and lakes, led to her passion for aquatic ecosystems that carried out through her education and career.

Tuchman went on to study biology and ecology at Central Michigan University to then earn a Masters of Science in aquatic ecology. From there she attended the University of Louisville to earn a Ph.D. in aquatic ecology in 1988 with advisor, R. Jan Stevenson. Her dissertation was titled: “Effects of different intensities and frequencies of disturbance by snail herbivory on periphyton succession.”

== Career and research ==
Tuchman's research focuses on human impacts to aquatic ecosystems with three main lines of research: effects of invasive species on coastal ecosystems, effects of Greenhouse gases on stream ecosystem food webs, and the effects of contaminants and pharmaceuticals on streams and lakes. She is currently examining the impacts of invasive species, Typha x glauca (hybrid cattail) and Phragmites australis (common reed) in the Great lakes coastal wetlands. Her team is now experimenting with economic and sustainable harvesting methods to remove the invasive plant species and use them as a biomass, as the cattail is high in cellulose-carbon- great for burning.

In 1988 she became an instructor in the biology department at Loyola University Chicago. Over 30 years of research, Tuchman has been awarded over $4.5 million in federal grants, she has authored or co-authored over 50 manuscripts and book chapters, and mentored or co-mentored over 100 undergraduate and graduate students in her lab. In 2002 she served as a program officer for the Ecosystem Studies Program at the National Science Foundation (NSF) to overseeing a $13 million budget and two programs, Ecosystem Studies and Coupled Natural and Human Systems.

After serving at the NSF, she returned to Loyola as Associate Provost for Research and Centers. This position gave her headway for the discussion and proposing of the idea to make a more energy efficient and sustainable campus and ultimately establish the Institute of Environmental Sustainability. Tuchman has been a leader in the efforts to re-imagine Loyola's campus as green certified, as well as incorporating environmental education in the core curriculum for all undergraduate students. In 2016, Loyola University Chicago was named one of the seven greenest universities in the nation according to Sierra Magazine. The Institute of Environmental Sustainability at Loyola has hosted an annual Climate Change Conference since 2015. Tuchman believes that Jesuit universities can play an important role in the development of incorporating environmental education into higher education across the board because climate change is tied to issues of social justice.

From 2008 to 2010, Tuchman served as president-elect and then president of the Society for Freshwater Science.

== Selected publications ==
- Effects of an invasive cattail species (Typha × glauca) on sediment nitrogen and microbial community composition in a freshwater wetland
- Elevated atmospheric CO2 lowers leaf litter nutritional quality for stream ecosystem food webs
- Changes in the Vertical Microdistribution of Diatoms within a Developing Periphyton Mat
- Differential heterotrophic utilization of organic compounds by diatoms and bacteria under light and dark conditions
- Elevated Atmospheric CO2 Alters Soil Microbial Communities Associated with Trembling Aspen (Populus tremuloides) Roots
- Patterns of environmental change associated with Typha x glauca invasion in a Great Lakes coastal wetland

=== Notable books, op-eds and journals written and co-edited ===
- Co-founder of Healing Earth, an on-line, free environmental science textbook.
- Wrote chapter, "A Preferential Option for the Earth" in Religious Perspectives on Transhumanism.
- Op-ed: "The Pope is Talking to You, Chicago" in Chicago Sun-Times. (2015)
- Op-ed: "Cold Truth: It's Time to Act on Climate Change" in Chicago Tribune. (2013)
- Tuchman, N.C. and M.J. Schuck. 2014. “A Preferential Option for the Earth.” In: Humanity at The Threshold: Religious Perspectives on Transhumanism. Eds. J. C. Haughey and I. Delio. The Council for Research in Values and Philosophy. Washington, D.C. 113–126.

== Awards and honors ==
- Society for Freshwater Science Fellows Award (2023)
- St. Peter Cansius Medal for Extraordinary Service, Int'l Assoc'n of Jesuit Universities (2022)
- Madonna della Strada Awardee from the Ignatian Voulnteer Corps (2020)
- Leadership in Science and Education Awardee, Peggy Notebaert Nature Museum (2020)
- Chicago Eco-Champion, Make it Better Magazine Chicago (2018)
- Expanded Reason Award, Pope Benedict XVI Foundation (2017)
- Honorary PhD Recipient and Commencement Speaker, Central MI University (2014)
- Chicago Magazine's Green Award (2013)
- Named 1 of the 24 Green Women Powerhouses Making a Difference in Chicago, The Wren (2013)
