= Odum School of Ecology =

Coordinates: 33.942677°N 83.372389°W

- Type: Public
- Established: 2001
- Dean: Mark D. Hunter
- Location: Athens, Georgia, USA
- Website: ecology.uga.edu

The Odum School of Ecology is a school within the University of Georgia and the successor of the UGA Institute of Ecology. It is named after Eugene Odum, renowned UGA biologist, the father of ecosystem ecology, and the founder of the Institute.

== History ==
It was started in 1961 as the Institute of Radiation Ecology, a research institute of faculty across various departments of the University. In 1993 the Institute (having dropped "radiation" from its name) assumed the status of a school within the Franklin College of Arts and Sciences. The College of Environment & Design (CED) was formed in 2001 by joining the School of Environmental Design and the Institute of Ecology. Six years later, on July 1, 2007, the Institute split from CED and was renamed as the Odum School in honor of its founder, Eugene Odum.

== Affiliated centers and labs ==
- Center for the Ecology of Infectious Diseases
- Coweeta Hydrologic Laboratory
- Joseph W. Jones Ecological Research Center
- Marine Institute at Sapelo Island
- River Basin Center
- Savannah River Ecology Laboratory
- Wormsloe Institute for Environmental History at the Wormsloe Historic Site

== Degrees offered ==
=== Undergraduate ===
The following undergraduate degrees are offered by the Odum School:

- Bachelor of Science in Ecology (B.S.)
- Bachelor of Arts in Ecology (B.A.)

=== Graduate degrees ===
- Master of Science in Ecology
- Master of Science in Integrative Conservation and Sustainability
- Doctor of Philosophy (Ph.D.) in Ecology
- Doctor of Philosophy (Ph.D.) in Integrative Conservation and Ecology

=== Certificates (non-degrees) ===
- Conservation Ecology
- Environmental Ethics
