= Huyck Preserve =

Edmund Niles Huyck Preserve and Biological Research Station
- Huyck Preserve
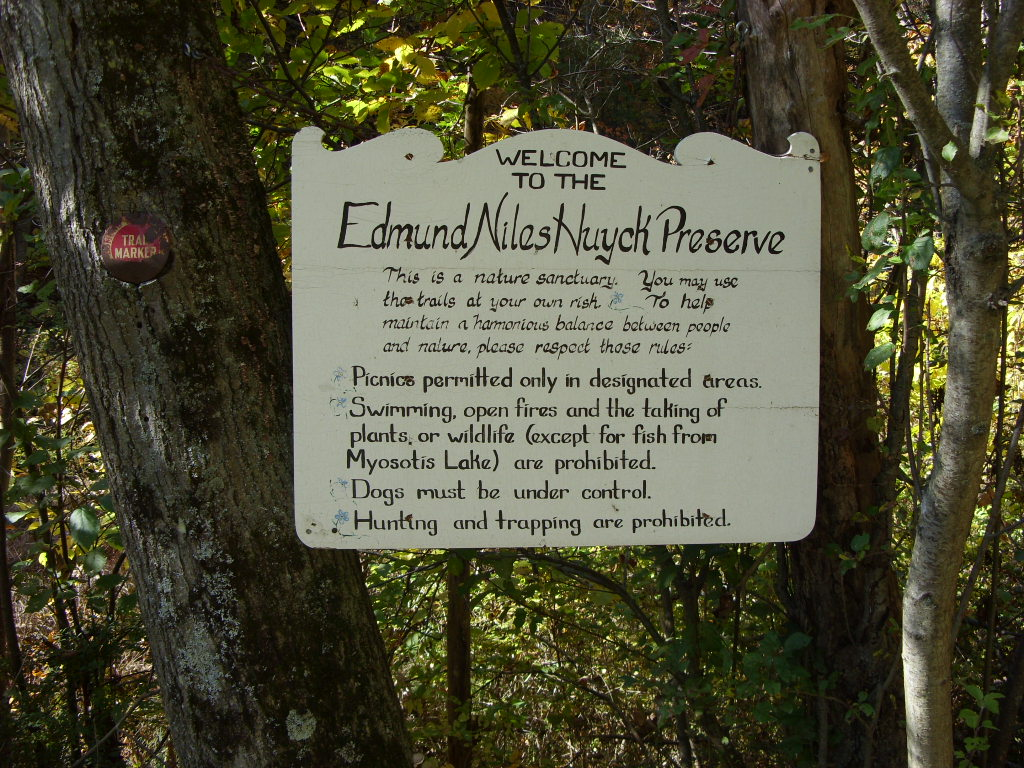
- Interactive map of Edmund Niles Huyck Preserve and Biological Research Station
- Nearest town: Rensselaerville, New York, United States
- Coordinates: 42.51562°N 74.13926°W
- Created: 1931

The Edmund Niles Huyck Preserve and Biological Research Station is a nature reserve in Rensselaerville, New York, United States.
