= Emma J. Rosi =

American ecosystem ecologist

Emma J Rosi
- Education: University of Michigan; University of Georgia
- Scientific career
- Fields: Hydrology (Watershed Ecology)
- Workplaces: Cary Institute of Ecosystem Studies

Emma J. Rosi is an ecosystem ecologist and Senior Scientist at the Cary Institute of Ecosystem Studies in Millbrook NY, where she serves as the director of the Baltimore Ecosystem Study.

== Early life and education ==
Emma Rosi grew up near Lake Michigan and spent a great deal of time outdoors as a child. From a very young age she was interested in pursuing a career in biology with a focus on insects. Eventually her graduate studies at the University of Georgia steered her toward research on rivers and streams. In 1993, Rosi attended the Field School at the Rocky Mountain Biological Station, and in 1994 she took part in a National Science Foundation Research Experience for Undergraduates. She earned her B.S. in anthropology and zoology at the University of Michigan in 1994, and her M.S. at the University of Georgia Department of Entomology in 1997. In 2002, she completed a PhD at the University of Georgia Institute of Ecology. Her dissertation was titled: "Suspended fine particulate matter quality in aquatic ecosystems and its role as a conduit for metals in riverine food webs."

== Career and research ==
Rosi's research focuses on stream ecosystem processes and biogeochemistry, including aquatic food webs, urban ecology, agricultural effects on streams, aquatic macroinvertebrates, large river ecology, and contaminants. Rosi has over 20 years of experiences working with aquatic ecosystems and conducting research. She has worked as an Associate Professor of biology and natural science at Loyola University of Chicago, and currently holds the position of Senior Scientist at the Cary Institute for Ecosystem Studies, where she has worked since 2009. Her published work includes studies of the stream ecology of Kenya's Mara River, and the effects of pharmaceutical contaminants on stream ecosystems. She has conducted field work in the Mara ecosystem of Southern Kenya and throughout the United States. In 2021, the US Environmental Protection Agency announced Dr. Rosi as a charter member of the Science Advisory Board. In 2022, Rosi was part of a committee reviewing marketed sunscreen ingredients and their effects on aquatic environments.

== Awards and honors ==
In 2018, Rosi appeared on the PBS news-show To the Contrary where she discussed the presence of hazards to human health in waterways. In 2019, Rosi delivered the Barry Commoner Lecture on the Environment at Marymount Manhattan College.

== Personal life ==
Rosi resides in Leelanau County, Michigan.
