= Catherine Pringle =

American aquatic ecologist

Catherine M. Pringle
- Education: University of Michigan (BS, PhD)
- Scientific career
- Workplaces: University of Georgia; University of California, Berkeley; Cornell University
- Thesis: Nutrient Heterogeneity And The Maintenance Of Species Diversity: Periphyton Response To Substratum And Water Enrichment In A Nutrient-poor Stream (1985)

Catherine Mann Pringle is a distinguished research professor at the Odum School of Ecology at the University of Georgia. She studies aquatic ecosystems and conservation. Pringle has previously served as president of the Society for Freshwater Science. She is a Fellow of the American Association for the Advancement of Science and the Ecological Society of America.

== Early life and education ==
Pringle studied environmental science at the University of Michigan. She earned her bachelor's degree in 1976, her master's in 1979 and her doctorate in 1986. After earning her PhD, Pringle joined the University of California, Berkeley as a postdoctoral scholar. She moved to Cornell University in 1991, where she stayed for two years before moving to the University of Georgia.

== Research and career ==
Pringle joined the University of Georgia in 1993 where she works on aquatic ecology. Her research involves studying the impact of climate change on neotropical streams. Working at the Organization for Tropical Studies La Selva Biological Station, Pringle he has collected almost three decades of data collected from lowland streams in Costa Rica. Pringle was awarded her first National Science Foundation Long Term Research in Environmental Biology (LTERB) in Costa Rica in 1985 and has continued to collect data since. She looks to understand the relationship between ecosystem processes in lowland tropical systems and surface–subsurface water interactions. In streams around La Selva solute-rich groundwater is transferred through subsurface flow, which alters nearby ecosystems. She showed that this solute-rich groundwater is responsible for almost half of stream discharge and can cause the build-up of cations in streams during the dry season. Solute-rich groundwater is associated with underlying volcanic activity, which alters the chemistry of the water through geothermal modification in Puerto Viejo Sarapiquí, a town near La Selva Biological Station. The town has undergone explosive population growth, which places increased demands on local water supplies, and pesticides from the banana plantations can result in contamination.

Pringle and her graduate students developed the environmental outreach program Water for Life, which focuses on water quality and quantity. The program involved volunteer stream monitoring (Adopt-a-Stream), posters to promote awareness of watershed protection and the development of teaching materials.

In 2008, she was made a distinguished research professor. She has investigated the role of specific species in maintaining the function of ecosystems, and how freshwater ecosystems adapt when certain species are lost. She has evaluated the impact of frog extinction in Panama's mountain streams and shrimp extirpation (local extinction) in Puerto Rico.

Alongside her research, Pringle is involved with the design of innovative graduate education programmes. At the University of Georgia she serves as a distinguished research professor and chair of the Odum School of Ecology Master's degree Conservation Ecology & Sustainable Development. In 2019 Pringle was made a Fellow of the Ecological Society of America for her contribution to stream ecosystems and mentoring of students in aquatic conservation ecology. She has taught on the Semester at Sea program.

=== Awards and honours ===
Her awards and honours include:

- 2000 University of Georgia Creative Research Medal
- 2009 Elected Fellow of the American Association for the Advancement of Science
- 2013 International Society of Limnology Kilham Memorial Award
- 2017 Elected to the Council of the American Association for the Advancement of Science
- 2019 Elected Fellow of the Ecological Society of America

=== Selected publications ===
Her publications include:

- Pringle, Catherine M. (2000). "Global-scale environmental effects of hydrological alterations: introduction". BioScience. 50 (9): 746–751. doi:10.1641/0006-3568(2000)050[0746:GSEEOH]2.0.CO;2. hdl:1993/33953. S2CID 55976827.
- Pringle, Catherine M. (2001). "Hydrologic connectivity and the management of biological reserves: a global perspective". Ecological Applications. 11 (4): 981–998. doi:10.1890/1051-0761(2001)011[0981:HCATMO]2.0.CO;2.
- Pringle, Catherine M. (2009). Assessing the conservation value of freshwaters: An international perspective. Cambridge University Press. ISBN 9780521613224.
