= Society for Freshwater Science =

International scientific society

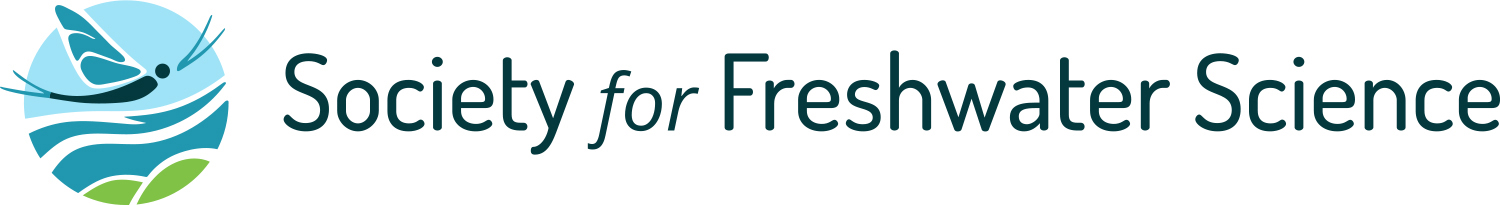
- Nickname: SFS
- Formation: 1953; 73 years ago
- Members: 1,800 (2019)
- President: David Arscott
- Past-President: Sherri Johnson
- President-Elect: Sally Entrekin
- Executive Director: Andreas Leidolf
- Website: freshwater-science.org
- Formerly called: Midwest Benthological Society; North American Benthological Society

The Society for Freshwater Science (SFS) is an international scientific society whose members study freshwater ecosystems (rivers, streams, lakes, reservoirs, and estuaries) and ecosystems at the interface between aquatic and terrestrial habitats (wetlands, bogs, fens, riparian forests, and grasslands).

== History ==
The Society for Freshwater Science was founded in 1953 in Havana, Illinois by 13 charter members, and was called the Midwest Benthological Society. It was later known as the North American Benthological Society before being renamed the Society for Freshwater Science.

== Membership and governance ==
Currently, SFS is approaching 1800 members. The majority of members are students from North American institutions. Members are employed in academia, consulting, federal and state agencies, and other governmental positions. Members are elected as officers and delegates by their fellow society members.

=== Executive committee ===
The executive committee is responsible for day-to-day business of the society and is made up of member officers elected by their peers. It includes the current president, the past president, the president-Elect, the treasurer, and the secretary; the current vice president, the vice president-elect, the public information and policy representative, the chair of the finance committee and the executive director participate in the committee but are non-voting members. Thus, being elected president of the society represents a three-year service role (one year each as president-Elect, president, and past president), and being elected vice president is a two-year role (one year each as vice president-elect and vice president).

==== Presidents ====
Recent presidents of the society include:

| Name | Year Elected | Year President |
|---|---|---|
| Sherri Johnson | 2022 | 2023-2024 |
| Steven Thomas | 2021 | 2022-2023 |
| Ashley Moerke | 2020 | 2021-2022 |
| Alonso Ramírez | 2019 | 2020-2021 |
| Amy Rosemond | 2018 | 2019-2020 |
| Jennifer Tank | 2017 | 2018-2019 |
| Colden Baxter | 2016 | 2017-2018 |
| Emily Bernhardt | 2015 | 2016-2017 |
| Matt R. Whiles | 2014 | 2015-2016 |
| David L. Strayer | 2013 | 2014-2015 |
| Randall Fuller | 2012 | 2013-2014 |
| David Penrose | 2011 | 2012-2013 |
| Joe Holomuzki | 2010 | 2011-2012 |
| Lucinda B. Johnson | 2009 | 2010-2011 |
| Nancy Tuchman | 2008 | 2009-2010 |
| Nick Aumen | 2007 | 2008-2009 |
| R. Jan Stevenson | 2006 | 2007-2008 |
| N. LeRoy Poff | 2005 | 2006-2007 |
| Michael T. Barbour | 2004 | 2005-2006 |
| Clifford N. Dahm | 2003 | 2004-2005 |
| F. Richard Hauer | 2002 | 2003-2004 |
| Catherine M. Pringle | 2001 | 2002-2003 |
| Bernard W. Sweeney | 2000 | 2001-2002 |
| Joseph Culp | 1999 | 2000-2001 |
| Nancy Grimm | 1998 | 1999-2000 |
| Leonard Smock | 1997 | 1998-1999 |
| Gary A. Lamberti | 1996 | 1997-1998 |
| Jack A. Stanford | 1995 | 1996-1997 |
| Alan P. Covich | 1994 | 1995-1996 |
| Ernest F. Benfield | 1993 | 1994-1995 |
| Colbert E. Cushing | 1992 | 1993-1994 |
| Charles F. Rabeni | 1991 | 1992-1993 |
| J. Bruce Wallace | 1990 | 1991-1992 |
| Stuart G. Fisher | 1989 | 1990-1991 |
| Leonard Ferrington | 1988 | 1989-1990 |
| Arthur C. Benke | 1987 | 1988-1989 |
| James Ward | 1986 | 1987-1988 |
| David M. Rosenberg | 1985 | 1986-1987 |
| Edwin Masteller | 1984 | 1985-1986 |
| Richard W. Merritt | 1983 | 1984-1985 |
| Vincent H. Resh | 1982 | 1983-1984 |

=== Other committees ===
The society is also governed by a board of directors and 19 standing committees: a finance committee, a board of trustees of the endowment fund, a development Committee, a Journal Endowment Committee, an Election and Place Committee, an Awards Selection Committee, a Long-Range Planning Committee, an Annual Meeting Committee, a Publications Committee, a Public Information and Policy Committee, a Constitutional Revision Committee, a Student Resources Committee, an Early Career Committee, a Taxonomic Certification Committee, a Technical Issues Committee, a Science and Policy Committee, an International Coordination Committee, a Conservation and Environmental Issues Committee, and an Education and Diversity Committee. As of 2021, the society also had three ad hoc committees: the Code of Conduct Committee, the JEDI Task Force focused on justice, equity, diversity, and inclusion, and the Membership and Data Committee.

== Annual meetings ==
SFS hosts an annual meeting for its members. On occasion, SFS has partnered with other scientific societies, such as the American Geophysical Union (AGU), the Association for the Sciences of Limnology and Oceanography (ASLO), the Phycological Society of America, and the Society of Wetland Scientists to host joint meetings.

== Journal ==
The main academic journal of the Society is the journal Freshwater Science. 4 issues are published each year. The journal was first published in 1982 and called Freshwater Invertebrate Biology. In 1986 the title was changed to Journal of the North American Benthological Society, and the title was changed again in 2012 to Freshwater Science.

About once a year the journal publishes open-access fact sheets called BRIDGES that cover new ideas in aquatic science using non-technical language.

== Awards ==
SFS gives out awards annually to its members, including naming members as SFS Fellows who have made excellent contributions to freshwater science over many years. The SFS Fellows program began in 2017 with a large first "class" of fellows:

| Year | SFS Fellows Named |
|---|---|
| 2017 | Clifford N. Dahm, David Penrose, Richard W. Merritt, James Ward, Dave Allen, Ben Stout, Jack A. Stanford, Jim Harrington, Bobbi Peckarski, Ken Cummins, Jerry Jacobi, Bob Hughes, Vincent H. Resh, Colin Townsend, Michael T. Barbour, Sam Lake, Stephen Hamilton, Stuart G. Fisher, Jack Webster, Margaret A. Palmer, Jim Karr, Walter Dodds, Arthur C. Benke, Wayne Minshall, J. Bruce Wallace, Judith L. Meyer, Susan Jackson |
| 2018 | Emily Stanley, Gary A. Lamberti, Chuck Hawkins, Denis Newbold |
| 2019 | Nancy Grimm, Alan P. Covich, F. Richard Hauer, Mary E. Power, Jeremy Monroe, Matt Whiles, N. LeRoy Poff |
| 2020 | Emily Bernhardt, Lucinda B. Johnson, Jennifer Tank, Valeria Souza, R. Jan Stevenson |
| 2021 | Leonard Ferrington, Mary Freeman, Judith Li, John Morse, Alan Steinman, Caryn Vaughn |

SFS also awards several other awards on an annual basis: the Award of Excellence, the Distinguished Service Award, the Environmental Stewardship Award, and Hynes Award for New Investigators, named after Noel Hynes; the Graduate Student Conservation Research Award; and awards for the best presentations and posters delivered by students at each annual meeting.

== Programs ==
The Instars and Emerge mentoring programs support underrepresented groups in freshwater science. Students who are accepted into the Instars program as mentees are assigned a graduate student mentor who helps them network at the annual meeting, while the Emerge program provides year-round mentoring.

SFS partners with the Stroud Center to provide an aquatic invertebrate taxonomic certification program for its members.

The society's endowment is also used to fund small awards for research and travel, particularly by students.

== Outreach ==
SFS has several programs focused on outreach to broader audiences. 'Making Waves' is a podcast hosted by society members that comes out semi-monthly and discusses freshwater science for a general audience. Society members also maintain media libraries through Flickr for general use. SFS holds a leaf pack workshop at the annual meetings for local environmental groups and educators. Finally, a group of SFS members recently developed the Ecological Evidence Exchange to create a publicly available database of scientific information to inform environmental management.
