= Hyporheic zone =

Region where there is mixing of shallow groundwater and surface water

The hyporheic zone is the region of sediment and porous space beneath and alongside a stream bed, where there is mixing of shallow groundwater and surface water. The flow dynamics and behavior in this zone (termed hyporheic flow or underflow) is recognized to be important for surface water/groundwater interactions, as well as fish spawning, among other processes. As an innovative urban water management practice, the hyporheic zone can be designed by engineers and actively managed for improvements in both water quality and riparian habitat.

The assemblages of organisms that inhabits this zone are called hyporheos.

The term hyporheic was originally coined by Traian Orghidan in 1959 by combining two Greek words: hypo (below) and rheos (flow).

== Hyporheic zone and hydrology ==
Hyporheic zone process

The hyporheic zone is the area of rapid exchange, where water is moved into and out of the stream bed and carries dissolved gas and solutes, contaminants, microorganisms and particles with it. Depending on the underlying geology and topography, the hyporheic zone can be only several centimeters deep, or extend up to tens of meters laterally or deep.

The conceptual framework of the hyporheic zone as both a mixing and storage zone are integral to the study of hydrology. The first key concept related to the hyporheic zone is that of residence time; water in the channel moves at a much faster rate compared to the hyporheic zone, so this flow of slower water effectively increases the water residence time within the stream channel. Water residence times influence nutrient and carbon processing rates. Longer residence times promote dissolved solute retention, which can be later released back into the channel, delaying or attenuating the signals produced by the stream channel.

The other key concept is that of hyporheic exchange, or the speed at which water enters or leaves the subsurface zone. Stream water enters the hyporheic zone temporarily, but eventually the stream water reenters the surface channel or contributes to groundwater storage. The rate of hyporheic exchange is influenced by streambed structure, with shorter water flow paths created by streambed roughness. Longer flowpaths are induced by geomorphic features, such as stream meander patterns, pool-riffle sequences, large woody debris dams, and other features.

The hyporheic zone and its interactions influence the volume of stream water that is moved downstream. Gaining reaches indicate that groundwater is discharged into the stream as water moves downstream, so that the volume of water in the main channel increases from upstream to downstream. Conversely, when surface water infiltrates into the groundwater zone (thereby resulting in a net loss of surface water), then that stream reach is considered to be "losing" water.

The hyporheic zone provides a variety of ecological benefits. Examples include:

- Habitat and shelter for different species of fish, aquatic plants and interstitial organisms;
- Reduction of the concentration of pollutants dissolved in the stream water;
- Control on the water and solute exchange between the main stream and the groundwater;
- Mitigation of river water temperature.

== Studying the hyporheic zone ==
A stream or river ecosystem is more than just the flowing water that can be seen on the surface: rivers are connected to the adjacent riparian areas. Therefore, streams and rivers include the dynamic hyporheic zone that lies below and lateral to the main channel. Because the hyporheic zone lies underneath the surface water, it can be difficult to identify, quantify, and observe. However, the hyporheic zone is a zone of biological and physical activity, and therefore has functional significance for stream and river ecosystems. Researchers use tools such as wells and piezometers, conservative and reactive tracers, and transport models that account for advection and dispersion of water in both the stream channel and the subsurface. These tools can be used independently to study water movement through the hyporheic zone and to the stream channel, but are often complementary for a more accurate picture of water dynamics in the channel as a whole.

== Biogeochemical significance ==
The hyporheic zone is an ecotone between the stream and subsurface: it is a dynamic area of mixing between surface water and groundwater at the sediment-water interface. From a biogeochemical perspective, groundwater is often low in dissolved oxygen but carries dissolved nutrients. Conversely, stream water from the main channel contains higher dissolved oxygen and lower nutrients. This creates a biogeochemical gradient, which can exist at varying depths depending on the extent of the hyporheic zone. Often, the hyporheic zone is dominated by heterotrophic microorganisms that process the dissolved nutrients exchanged at this interface.

== Hyporheic zone: main characteristics and causes of the hyporheic exchange ==
The main differences between the surface water and groundwater concern the oxygen concentration, the temperature and the pH. As interface region between the main stream and the groundwater the hyporheic zone is subjected to physic-chemical gradients generating biochemical reactions able to regulate the behavior of the chemical compounds and the aquatic organisms within the exchange area. The hyporheic zone provides an important contribution to the attenuation of contaminants dissolved in the channel water and to the cycle of energy, nutrients and organic compounds. Moreover, it exhibits a significant control on the transport of pollutants across the river basin.

The main factors affecting the hyporheic exchange are:

- Underlying aquifer geometry and hydraulic properties
- Temporal variation in water table height
- Topographic characteristics and permeability of the streambed
- Horizontal gradients generated by changes in the stream channel's shape
