= Margaret A. Palmer =

American ecologist

- Born: Florida
- Education: Emory University (B.S.), University of South Carolina (M.S., Ph.D.)
- Known for: Restoration ecology, Limnology, Ecotoxicology
- Scientific career
- Workplaces: Wabash College, University of Maryland
- Thesis: The role of behavior and flow in the dispersal of marine meiofauna (1983)
- Website: palmerlab.umd.edu

Margaret A. Palmer (/ˈpɑːlmər/) is a Distinguished University Professor in the Department of Entomology at the University of Maryland and director of the National Socio-Environmental Synthesis Center (SESYNC). Palmer works on the restoration of streams and rivers, and is co-author of the book Foundations of Restoration Ecology. Palmer has been an invited speaker in numerous and diverse settings including regional and international forums, science-diplomacy venues (e.g., in North Korea), and popular outlets such as The Colbert Report.

== Education and career ==
Palmer has a B.S. in biology from Emory University (1977), and completed her M.S. (1979) and Ph.D. (1983) in coastal oceanography at the University of South Carolina with a focus on hydrodynamics and dispersal of benthic organisms. Palmer was an assistant professor at Wabash College from 1983 to 1987, and then moved to the University of Maryland in 1987. Palmer was a program officer in Ecology at the National Science Foundation from 1999 to 2000. From 2005 to 2011, Palmer was the director of the Chesapeake Biological Laboratory at which point she transitioned into her current position as director, National Socio-Environmental Synthesis Center.

== Research ==
Palmer's research focuses on restoration ecology, offering a new approach of incorporating human needs for ecosystem services into restoration plans to create sustainable environments for all species. Her research suggests it is unlikely for a disrupted ecosystem to be restored to original conditions so it is necessary to engineer a productive ecosystem that will serve the needs of the current biological community as well as the growing human population. Palmer also documents the relationship between stream recovery and water quality, finding that recovery is often dependent on removing the source of contamination rather than improving any physical stream structures.

=== Restoration ecology ===
Palmer conducted multiple research projects in the field of restoration ecology and co-authored the book Foundations of Restoration Ecology. She outlines the methods and goals associated with restoring ecosystems and works to bridge the gap between ecological theory and restorative ecology in practice. The book provides a history of ecological theory and restoration, requirements for a functional ecosystem, and planning for environmental stressors like climate change. In her research, she challenges the traditional methods of stream restoration that focus solely on improving the physical aspects of stream habitats such as adding meanders. She suggests a more holistic approach that observes the inputs and outputs of the ecosystem and how biodiversity can be increased.

=== Mountaintop mining ===
Palmer led a study on the impacts of mountaintop mining, a method of extracting coal by removing the summits of mountains to access coal seams close to the surface, on stream ecosystems. The study concluded that the controversial method of resource extraction has irreversible effects on the ecosystem, specifically headwater systems. Palmer documents the change in stream health showing a decrease in species biodiversity, poor water quality, higher stormwater runoff, and high concentrations of contaminants. She has been called as an expert witness to testify before congress on the issue of mountain top mining and joined other scientists in calling for an end to the practice.

=== Contributions to ecotoxicology ===
Palmer's research extends into the field of ecotoxicology where her research has shown that the addition of physical structures or improvements to habitat complexity is not sufficient for increasing biodiversity when contaminants are still entering the ecosystem. In Chesapeake Bay, she has research nonpoint source pollution in stream-wetland complexes which were designed to increase hydraulic conductivity and filter out pollutants to reduce the total suspended solids (TSS). Palmer's research concluded that stressors such as intense storms and the volume of TSS upstream were more likely to affect stream health than increasing stream-wetland complexes.

=== Selected publications ===
- Palmer, M.A. et al. 2004. Ecology for a crowded planet. Science 304: 1251-1252.
- Bernhardt, E.S., M. A. Palmer et al. 2005. Restoration of U.S. Rivers: a national synthesis. Science 308:636-637.
- Palmer, M.A. et al. 2010. Mountaintop Mining Consequences. Science 327 (5962): 148-149.
- Palmer, M.A., C. Reidy, C. Nilsson et al. 2008. Climate change and the world's river basins: anticipating response options. Frontiers in Ecology and the Environment 6: 81-89.
- Palmer, M.A., B. Koch, and K. Hondula. 2014. Ecological restoration of streams and rivers: shifting strategies and shifting goals. Annual Review of Ecology, Evolution, and Systematics 45: 247-269

== Awards ==
- Elected to the American Academy of Arts and Sciences (2024)
- British Ecological Society Honorary Membership (2022)
- Ruth Patrick Award, Association for the Sciences of Limnology and Oceanography (2018)
- Fellow, Society for Freshwater Science (2017)
- Sustainability Science Award, Ecological Society of America (2016)
- Distinguished University Professor, University of Maryland (2015)
- Award of Excellence, Society for Freshwater Science (2015)
- Fellow, Ecological Society of America (2012)
- Henry J. Oosting Memorial Lecturer, Duke University (2012)
- University System of Maryland, Board of Regents Faculty Award for Excellence (2011)
- University of Maryland Center for Environmental Science, President's Award for Excellence in Application of Science (2010)
- Distinguished Ecologist citation, Colorado State University (2006)
- Distinguished Service Award, Ecological Society of America (2006)
- Fellow, American Association for the Advancement of Science (2002)
- Aldo Leopold Leadership Fellow (2001)
- Distinguished Scholar Teacher, University of Maryland (1993)
