= Ecosystem ecology =

Study of living and non-living components of ecosystems and their interactions

Figure 1. A riparian forest in the White Mountains, New Hampshire (USA).

Ecosystem ecology is the integrated study of living (biotic) and non-living (abiotic) components of ecosystems and their interactions within an ecosystem framework. This science examines how ecosystems work and relates this to their components such as chemicals, bedrock, soil, plants, and animals. Ecosystem ecologists study these relationships on large scales, linking biological diversity with ecosystem sustainability and function.

Ecosystem ecology examines physical and biological structures and examines how these ecosystem characteristics interact with each other. Ultimately, this helps us understand how to maintain high quality water and economically viable commodity production. A major focus of ecosystem ecology is on functional processes, ecological mechanisms that maintain the structure and services produced by ecosystems. These include primary productivity (production of biomass), decomposition, and trophic interactions.

Studies of ecosystem function have greatly improved human understanding of sustainable production of forage, fiber, fuel, and provision of water. Functional processes are mediated by regional-to-local level climate, disturbance, and management. Thus ecosystem ecology provides a powerful framework for identifying ecological mechanisms that interact with global environmental problems, especially global warming and degradation of surface water.

This example demonstrates several important aspects of ecosystems:

1. Ecosystem boundaries are often nebulous and may fluctuate in time
2. Organisms within ecosystems are dependent on ecosystem level biological and physical processes
3. Adjacent ecosystems closely interact and often are interdependent for maintenance of community structure and functional processes that maintain productivity and biodiversity

These characteristics also introduce practical problems into natural resource management. Who will manage which ecosystem? Will timber cutting in the forest degrade recreational fishing in the stream? These questions are difficult for land managers to address while the boundary between ecosystems remains unclear; even though decisions in one ecosystem will affect the other. We need better understanding of the interactions and interdependencies of these ecosystems and the processes that maintain them before we can begin to address these questions.

Ecosystem ecology is an inherently interdisciplinary field of study. An individual ecosystem is composed of populations of organisms, interacting within communities, and contributing to the cycling of nutrients and the flow of energy. The ecosystem is the principal unit of study in ecosystem ecology.

Population, community, and physiological ecology provide many of the underlying biological mechanisms influencing ecosystems and the processes they maintain. Flowing of energy and cycling of matter at the ecosystem level are often examined in ecosystem ecology, but, as a whole, this science is defined more by subject matter than by scale. Ecosystem ecology approaches organisms and abiotic pools of energy and nutrients as an integrated system which distinguishes it from associated sciences such as biogeochemistry.

Biogeochemistry and hydrology focus on several fundamental ecosystem processes such as biologically mediated chemical cycling of nutrients and physical-biological cycling of water. Ecosystem ecology forms the mechanistic basis for regional or global processes encompassed by landscape-to-regional hydrology, global biogeochemistry, and earth system science.

== History ==
Ecosystem ecology is philosophically and historically rooted in terrestrial ecology. The ecosystem concept has evolved rapidly during the last 100 years with important ideas developed by Frederic Clements, a botanist who argued for specific definitions of ecosystems and that physiological processes were responsible for their development and persistence. Although most of Clements ecosystem definitions have been greatly revised, initially by Henry Gleason and Arthur Tansley, and later by contemporary ecologists, the idea that physiological processes are fundamental to ecosystem structure and function remains central to ecology.

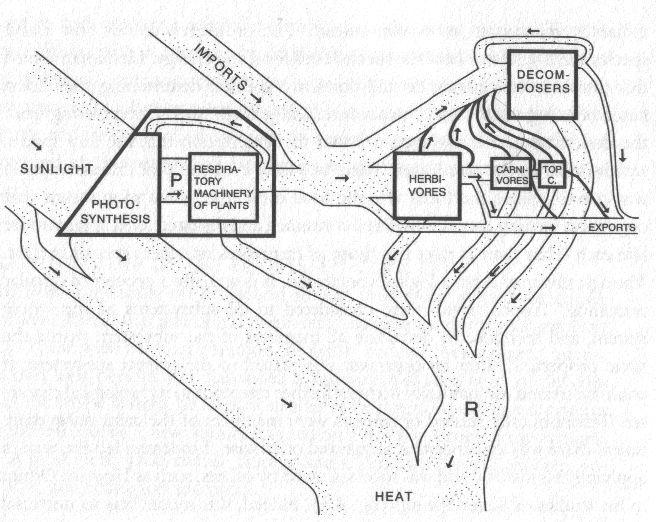
Figure 3. Energy and matter flows through an ecosystem, adapted from the Silver Springs model. H are herbivores, C are carnivores, TC are top carnivores, and D are decomposers. Squares represent biotic pools and ovals are fluxes or energy or nutrients from the system.

Later work by Eugene Odum and Howard T. Odum quantified flows of energy and matter at the ecosystem level, thus documenting the general ideas proposed by Clements and his contemporary Charles Elton.

In this model, energy flows through the whole system were dependent on biotic and abiotic interactions of each individual component (species, inorganic pools of nutrients, etc.). Later work demonstrated that these interactions and flows applied to nutrient cycles, changed over the course of succession, and held powerful controls over ecosystem productivity. Transfers of energy and nutrients are innate to ecological systems regardless of whether they are aquatic or terrestrial. Thus, ecosystem ecology has emerged from important biological studies of plants, animals, terrestrial, aquatic, and marine ecosystems.

== Ecosystem services ==
Ecosystem services are ecologically mediated functional processes essential to sustaining healthy human societies. Water provision and filtration, production of biomass in forestry, agriculture, and fisheries, and removal of greenhouse gases such as carbon dioxide (CO_{2}) from the atmosphere are examples of ecosystem services essential to public health and economic opportunity. Nutrient cycling is a process fundamental to agricultural and forest production.

However, like most ecosystem processes, nutrient cycling is not an ecosystem characteristic which can be "dialed" to the most desirable level. Maximizing production in degraded systems is an overly simplistic solution to the complex problems of hunger and economic security. For instance, intensive fertilizer use in the midwestern United States has resulted in degraded fisheries in the Gulf of Mexico. Regrettably, a "Green Revolution" of intensive chemical fertilization has been recommended for agriculture in developed and developing countries. These strategies risk alteration of ecosystem processes that may be difficult to restore, especially when applied at broad scales without adequate assessment of impacts. Ecosystem processes may take many years to recover from significant disturbance.

For instance, large-scale forest clearance in the northeastern United States during the 18th and 19th centuries has altered soil texture, dominant vegetation, and nutrient cycling in ways that impact forest productivity in the present day. An appreciation of the importance of ecosystem function in maintenance of productivity, whether in agriculture or forestry, is needed in conjunction with plans for restoration of essential processes. Improved knowledge of ecosystem function will help to achieve long-term sustainability and stability in the poorest parts of the world.

== Operation ==
Biomass productivity is one of the most apparent and economically important ecosystem functions. Biomass accumulation begins at the cellular level via photosynthesis. Photosynthesis requires water and consequently global patterns of annual biomass production are correlated with annual precipitation. Amounts of productivity are also dependent on the overall capacity of plants to capture sunlight which is directly correlated with plant leaf area and N content.

Net primary productivity (NPP) is the primary measure of biomass accumulation within an ecosystem. Net primary productivity can be calculated by a simple formula where the total amount of productivity is adjusted for total productivity losses through maintenance of biological processes:

NPP = GPP – R_{producer}

Figure 4. Seasonal and annual changes in ambient carbon dioxide (CO_{2}) concentration at Mauna Loa Hawaii (Atmosphere) and above the canopy of a deciduous forest in Massachusetts (Forest). Data show clear seasonal trends associated with periods of high and low NPP and an overall annual increase of atmospheric CO_{2}. Data approximates of those reported by Keeling and Whorf and Barford.

Where GPP is gross primary productivity and R_{producer} is photosynthate (Carbon) lost via cellular respiration.

NPP is difficult to measure but a new technique known as eddy co-variance has shed light on how natural ecosystems influence the atmosphere. Figure 4 shows seasonal and annual changes in CO_{2} concentration measured at Mauna Loa, Hawaii from 1987 to 1990. CO_{2} concentration steadily increased, but within-year variation has been greater than the annual increase since measurements began in 1957.

These variations were thought to be due to seasonal uptake of CO_{2} during summer months. A newly developed technique for assessing ecosystem NPP has confirmed seasonal variation are driven by seasonal changes in CO_{2} uptake by vegetation. This has led many scientists and policy makers to speculate that ecosystems can be managed to ameliorate problems with global warming. This type of management may include reforesting or altering forest harvest schedules for many parts of the world.

=== Decomposition and nutrient cycling ===
Decomposition and nutrient cycling are fundamental to ecosystem biomass production. Most natural ecosystems are nitrogen (N) limited and biomass production is closely correlated with N turnover. Typically external input of nutrients is very low and efficient recycling of nutrients maintains productivity. Decomposition of plant litter accounts for the majority of nutrients recycled through ecosystems (Figure 3). Rates of plant litter decomposition are highly dependent on litter quality; high concentration of phenolic compounds, especially lignin, in plant litter has a retarding effect on litter decomposition. More complex C compounds are decomposed more slowly and may take many years to completely breakdown. Decomposition is typically described with exponential decay and has been related to the mineral concentrations, especially manganese, in the leaf litter.

Figure 5. Dynamics of decomposing plant litter (A) described with an exponential model (B) and a combined exponential-linear model (C).

Globally, rates of decomposition are mediated by litter quality and climate. Ecosystems dominated by plants with low-lignin concentration often have rapid rates of decomposition and nutrient cycling. Simple carbon (C) containing compounds are preferentially metabolized by decomposer microorganisms which results in rapid initial rates of decomposition, see Figure 5A, models that depend on constant rates of decay; so called "k" values, see Figure 5B. In addition to litter quality and climate, the activity of soil fauna is very important

However, these models do not reflect simultaneous linear and non-linear decay processes which likely occur during decomposition. For instance, proteins, sugars and lipids decompose exponentially, but lignin decays at a more linear rate Thus, litter decay is inaccurately predicted by simplistic models.

A simple alternative model presented in Figure 5C shows significantly more rapid decomposition that the standard model of figure 4B. Better understanding of decomposition models is an important research area of ecosystem ecology because this process is closely tied to nutrient supply and the overall capacity of ecosystems to sequester CO_{2} from the atmosphere.

=== Trophic dynamics ===
Trophic dynamics refers to process of energy and nutrient transfer between organisms. Trophic dynamics is an important part of the structure and function of ecosystems. Figure 3 shows energy transferred for an ecosystem at Silver Springs, Florida. Energy gained by primary producers (plants, P) is consumed by herbivores (H), which are consumed by carnivores (C), which are themselves consumed by "top- carnivores"(TC).

One of the most obvious patterns in Figure 3 is that as one moves up to higher trophic levels (i.e. from plants to top-carnivores) the total amount of energy decreases. Plants exert a "bottom-up" control on the energy structure of ecosystems by determining the total amount of energy that enters the system.

However, predators can also influence the structure of lower trophic levels from the top-down. These influences can dramatically shift dominant species in terrestrial and marine systems The interplay and relative strength of top-down vs. bottom-up controls on ecosystem structure and function is an important area of research in the greater field of ecology.

Trophic dynamics can strongly influence rates of decomposition and nutrient cycling in time and in space. For example, herbivory can increase litter decomposition and nutrient cycling via direct changes in litter quality and altered dominant vegetation. Insect herbivory has been shown to increase rates of decomposition and nutrient turnover due to changes in litter quality and increased frass inputs.

However, insect outbreak does not always increase nutrient cycling. Stadler showed that C rich honeydew produced during aphid outbreak can result in increased N immobilization by soil microbes thus slowing down nutrient cycling and potentially limiting biomass production. North Atlantic marine ecosystems have been greatly altered by overfishing of cod. Cod stocks crashed in the 1990s which resulted in increases in their prey such as shrimp and snow crab Human intervention in ecosystems has resulted in dramatic changes to ecosystem structure and function. These changes are occurring rapidly and have unknown consequences for economic security and human well-being. Further research can help make the effects of biodiversity changes on ecosystem function more clear.

== Applications and importance ==
=== Lessons from two Central American cities ===
The biosphere has been greatly altered by the demands of human societies. Ecosystem ecology plays an important role in understanding and adapting to the most pressing current environmental problems. Restoration ecology and ecosystem management are closely associated with ecosystem ecology. Restoring highly degraded resources depends on integration of functional mechanisms of ecosystems. By using strategies that consider both social and ecological goals as joint goals, sustainable development can be achieved by considering ecosystem ecology through a joint lens, rather than two separate ones.

Without these functions intact, economic value of ecosystems is greatly reduced and potentially dangerous conditions may develop in the field. For example, areas within the mountainous western highlands of Guatemala are more susceptible to catastrophic landslides and crippling seasonal water shortages due to loss of forest resources. In contrast, cities such as Totonicapán that have preserved forests through strong social institutions have greater local economic stability and overall greater human well-being.

This situation is striking considering that these areas are close to each other, the majority of inhabitants are of Mayan descent, and the topography and overall resources are similar. This is a case of two groups of people managing resources in fundamentally different ways. Ecosystem ecology provides the basic science needed to avoid degradation and to restore ecosystem processes that provide for basic human needs.

=== Climate change impacts ===
Climate change influences ecosystem ecology by altering the processes that drive global ecosystems. Many of these processes cause a decline in biodiversity which reduces ecosystem functioning. Anthropogenic influences like greenhouse gas emissions and land cover change create added pressures for ecosystems, such as habitat fragmentation and degradation. Additional stressors include shifts in species ranges and life cycle events. As the effects of climate change are exacerbated, these stressors will have a greater effect on ecosystems across the globe.

=== Relationship to One Health ===
One Health studies the intersection of human health, animal health, and biological health. Because of this, it is closely tied to ecosystem ecology. Healthy ecosystems can prevent the spread of diseases. One Health recognizes that healthy ecosystems are connected to the health of humans and animals, and thus considers ecosystem ecology. Extensive communication between communities and One Health researchers is essential for success within a broader ecosystem ecology framework.

== See also ==
- Biogeochemistry
- Community ecology
- Earth system science
- Holon (philosophy)
- Landscape ecology
- Systems ecology
- MuSIASEM
