= Belmont Hotel (Madison, Wisconsin) =

- U.S. National Register of Historic Places
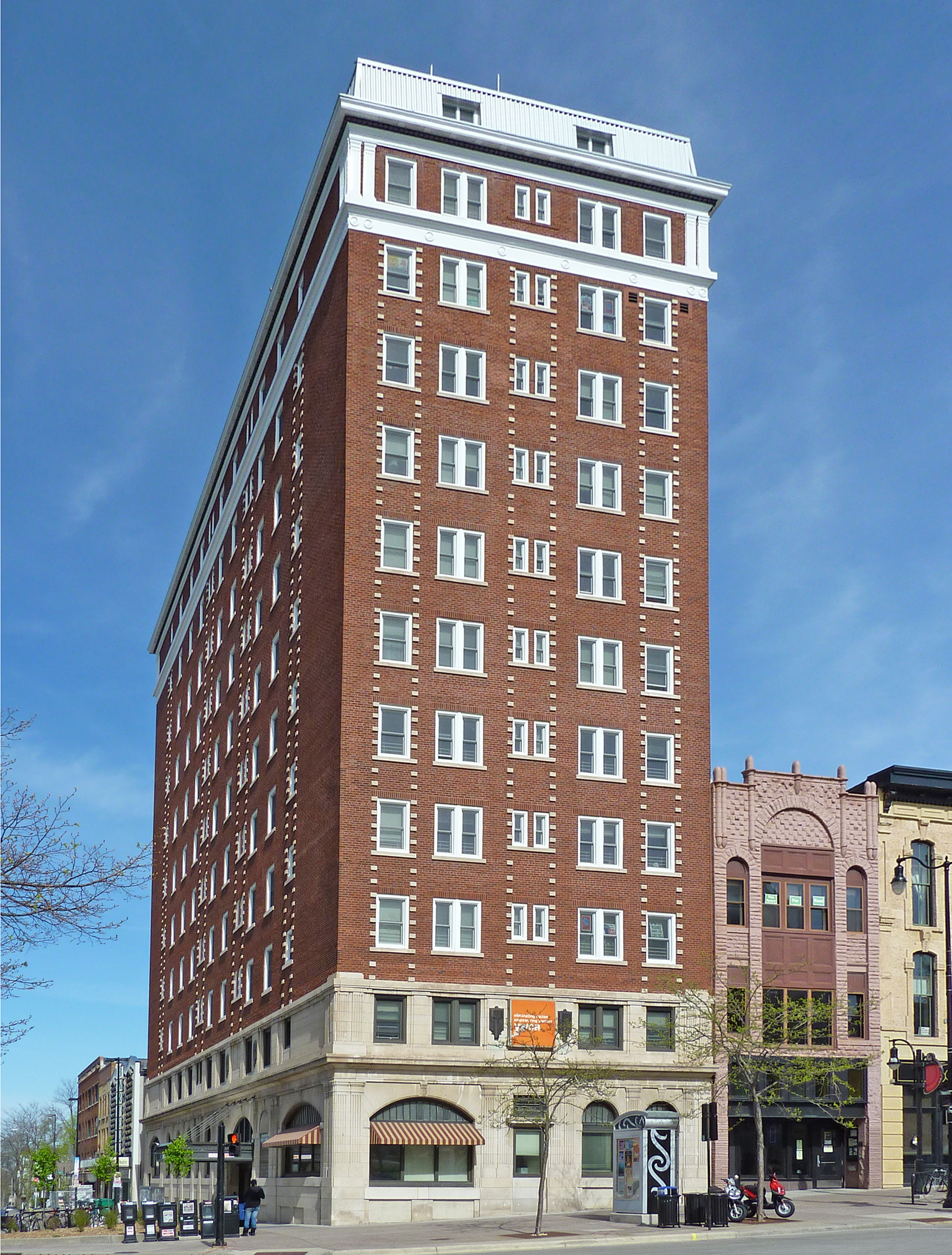
- Belmont Hotel

- Location within Wisconsin Location within the United States
- Interactive map showing the location of Belmont Hotel
- Location: 101 E. Mifflin St., Madison, Wisconsin
- Coordinates: 43°4′35″N 89°23′0″W
- Area: less than one acre
- Architect: Balch, Harold C.; Et al.
- Architectural style: Classical Revival
- NRHP reference No.: 89002311
- Added to NRHP: January 18, 1990

The Belmont Hotel is a twelve-story residential high rise built as a hotel on the Capitol Square in Madison, Wisconsin, in 1924. At that time it was the tallest building near the Capitol, and concern that it blocked the view spurred height-limit restrictions that are still in place. In 1990 the building was placed on the National Register of Historic Places.

== History ==
Madison's first hotel was the American House, built in 1838 on the Capitol Square site where the American Exchange Bank now stands. Over the years other hotels sprang up around town: downtown hotels for legislators and salesmen, resort hotels on the lakeshores, and railroad hotels near the depots. The early 1900s saw growth of state government, the University of Wisconsin, industry, conventions, and auto tourism. All of these drove a need for more lodging space, producing a brief boom in hotel construction. The Belmont was one result, along with the Hotel Loraine and an expansion of the Park Hotel.

After growing up on his parents' farm west of Madison, Charles Piper joined a grocery business in 1892 and eventually bought full control of it. He brought in his brother Samuel, and they expanded the store into a chain of retail grocery stores. They brought in two more Piper brothers and added a motorized delivery service in 1904. In 1910 the Pipers moved one of their stores into the Joseph Kaiser Fair Store at the intersection of Mifflin and Pinckney Streets, the corner site where the Belmont Hotel now stands. Across the street they bought the F.A. Ogden Block, an old five-story building with stores at street level and the Madison Hotel above. The Pipers renamed it the Belmont Hotel, and H.H. Hile managed it for them successfully, while the Pipers also opened a cafeteria in the same building. By the 1920s the era of a successful grocery store on the Capitol Square was drawing to a close, and in place of their store, they decided to build a bigger, modern, New Belmont Hotel - a moderatelypriced commercial hotel right on the Square.

The Piper brothers financed the $400,000 project largely through the sale of first mortgage bonds to local investors, including many farmers. Madison architects Balch & Grover designed the new Belmont in neoclassical style, with the whole building suggesting one classical column. The basement, first floor, and mezzanine are clad in limestone, suggesting the base of the column. The next eight stories are clad in red brick, suggesting the shaft of the column. Limestone decoration that contrasts with the brick connects the windows into vertical lines, suggesting fluting on the column. The eleventh floor is framed by a metal entablature below and a cornice above - the head of the column. The building's framework is reinforced concrete, and interior walls are hollow clay tile - a fireproof design which was fairly new at the time. The structure was built from 1923 to 1924 by Baily & Kasson Company of Chicago. Inside, the hotel had 200 small rooms arranged so that each pair shared a bathtub to save space. The hotel opened with a flower shop in the lobby and the Old English Room restaurant in the basement, and charged between $2.00 and $3.00 per night for a room.

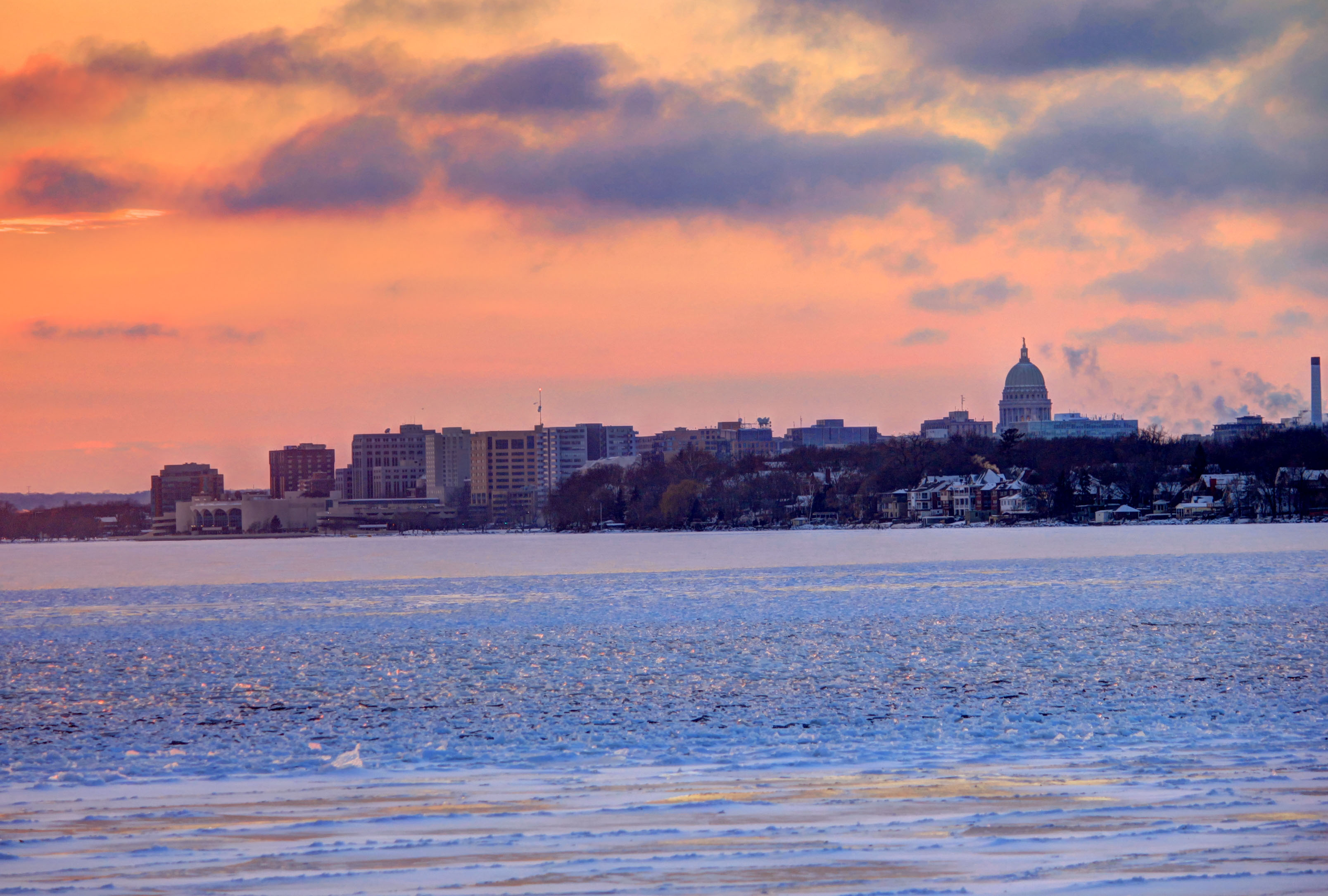
Skyline in 2013

The height of the New Belmont Hotel stirred controversy. Up to this time, the tallest building near the Capitol had been the nine-story Gay Building (now renamed the Churchill Building) at 16 N. Carroll Street. When built in 1915, the Gay Building was Madison's first "skyscraper." However, the Madison Art League and City Planner John Nolan were concerned that someday tall buildings might hem in the capitol and obstruct the view of its beautiful and symbolic dome. Similar debates were occurring in many cities at the dawn of the skyscraper era: Should we let the towering rectangles of modern commerce hide and overshadow our dear old civic institutions - our graceful government buildings and churches? In response to the Gay Building, skyscraper opponents pushed for legislation to limit the height of buildings around the Capitol Square, but the attorney general "ruled that the state could only regulate construction on the basis of health and safety, not aesthetics." Plans for the New Belmont reignited this debate, and legislation imposing a 90-foot height limit on buildings near the capitol was passed. This time the rule was upheld by the Wisconsin Supreme Court, and the 90-foot limit remains to this day, leaving the 284-foot Capitol dome prominent on Madison's skyline.

The Belmont's designers, Harold Charles Balch and Grover Henry Lippert, were sons of Neillsville, Wisconsin, who took different paths into architecture but ended up in partnership with J. O. Gordon in Madison. Some of their other buildings are the 1917 Prairie School-style Madison Waterworks at 311 N. Hancock Street, the 1924 Georgian Revival-style Alpha Gamma Delta sorority house at 220 Lakelawn Place, the 1925 Tudor Revival-style Koch house at 2316 Eton Ridge, the 1927 Halperin building at 434 State Street, the 1928 Tudor Revival-style Westgate Apartments at 2019 University Avenue, the 1930 neoclassical Dr. Bertrand Building at 320 State Street, the 1930 Art Deco Osborn building at 310 State Street, the 1935 Colonial Revival Pribnow House at 1114 Spaight Street, the 1937 Arte Moderne-style Lyon Apartments at 330 N. Carroll Street, the 1937 Buenzli House at 1345 Rutledge Street, and the 1938 Vogel Brothers apartment at 2306 Kendall Avenue.

The Belmont functioned as a hotel into the 1960s, owned by the Piper family. In 1968 the YWCA bought the building and began a $300,000 renovation, adding a twelfth-floor swimming pool on top of the building, among other changes.

== See also ==
- List of tallest buildings in Madison
