= Wisconsin (statue) =

Monument on the Wisconsin Capitol

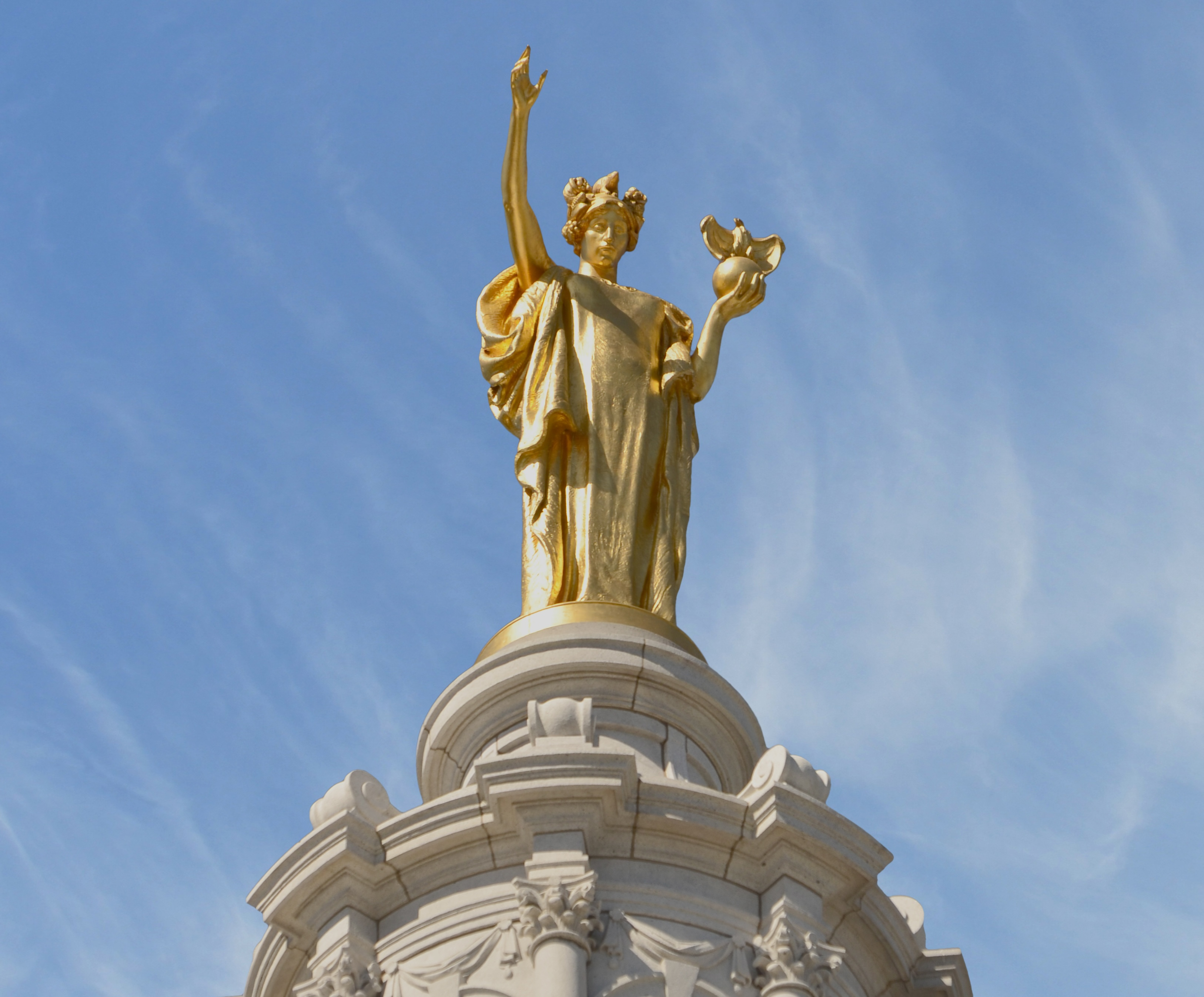
- Artist: Daniel Chester French
- Year: 1913-14
- Dimensions: 470 cm (185 in)
- Location: Madison, Wisconsin; 43°4′28″N 89°23′5″W

Wisconsin is a statue on top of the Wisconsin Capitol Building created by Daniel Chester French. The statue is the highest point in Madison, on top of the tallest building in Madison.

== History ==
The Wisconsin statue on the dome was sculpted during 1913–1914 by Daniel Chester French of New York City. His model was Audrey Munson.

The statue is named Wisconsin, though it is often misidentified as Forward, another statue depicting a feminine personification of the state of Wisconsin that is located on the Capitol grounds at the top of State Street. The statue was sculpted by Daniel Chester French, who also created the Abraham Lincoln statue for the Lincoln Memorial. Wisconsin looks toward Lake Monona with her right hand outstretched, while her left hand cradles a globe with an eagle perched on it. On top of her helmet are clusters of grapes and the state animal, the badger. French sculpted the 15 foot, five inch, more than three-ton statue in 1914 for a cost of $20,325. The statue is 23 1/2 karat gold-gilded bronze.

Wisconsin was installed atop the Capitol dome on July 20, 1914. At the request of Capitol architect George B. Post, the statue faces southeast, toward Lake Monona. This was done to align with John Nolen's proposal for a parkway extending from Capitol Square to the lake, although Nolen's plan was never implemented.

From the 1950s until the 1980s, students at the nearby University of Wisconsin called the statue "Mrs. Rennebohm", after Oscar Rennebohm, Wisconsin's governor from 1947 to 1951, and owner of a large drugstore chain. Students used to joke that the statue's outstretched arm was pointing out a location for a new store.

== Description ==
This work, Wisconsin, consists of an allegorical figure reminiscent of Athena, dressed in Greek garb, her right arm outstretched to symbolize the state motto, "Forward", and wearing a helmet topped by a badger, the Wisconsin state animal. The figure's left hand holds a globe with an eagle perched on top.

Wisconsin is 15 ft 5 in (4.70 m) tall and weighs 3 short tons (2.7 t).

The lady is also in a mural in the Wisconsin State Assembly.

== See also ==
- Public sculptures by Daniel Chester French
