= List of tallest buildings in Madison =

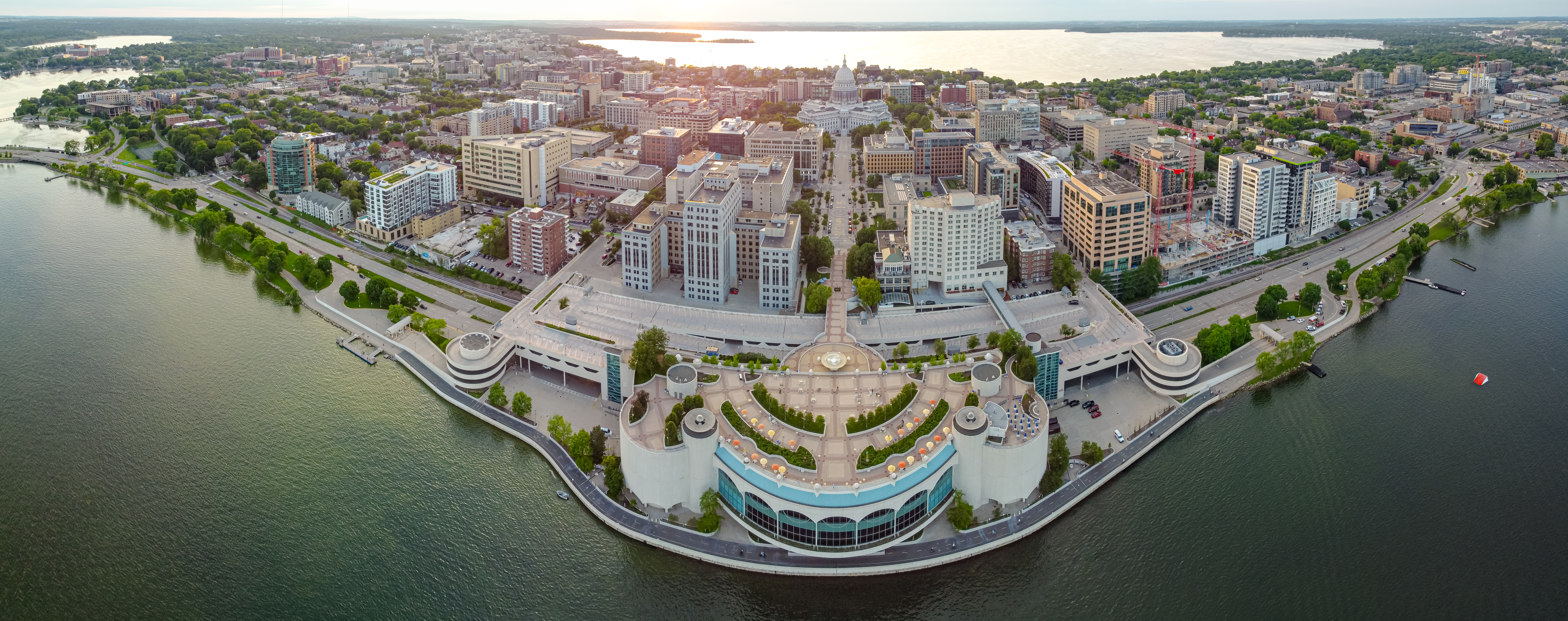
Madison, Wisconsin skyline

This is a list of the tallest buildings in Madison, Wisconsin. Lists vary due to completion status and "approximate" heights provided, so a list of all high-rise buildings showing floor counts and construction status is probably more useful. The Wisconsin State Capitol is the tallest building in Madison. The tallest building in Madison's central business district is the State Office Building. In the mid- to late-2000s more high-rise buildings were constructed. A height restriction on the Madison Isthmus protects views of the Wisconsin State Capitol. The law restricts buildings to be no taller than the base of the pillars surrounding the dome (about 187 feet).

The history of skyscrapers in Madison begins with the Churchill Building, completed in 1915. The current State Capitol was completed in 1917, and was the third built in Madison, replacing the previous one which was destroyed in a fire on February 27, 1904. Because of Madison's height restriction, buildings rarely exceed over 160 feet in height. The tallest building ever proposed was the Archipelago Village Tower, a 27-story, 570-foot-tall (170 m) office and condominium tower, however it is unlikely to ever be constructed because of the city's height restriction.

This list includes certain well-known high-rise buildings (over 35 meters). Many buildings in that height range are omitted.

== Tallest buildings ==
Rank	Name	Image	Height ft / m	Floors	Year	Note
1	Wisconsin State Capitol		284 / 86	6	1917	Tallest building in Madison, and tallest building in the state outside of Milwaukee.
2	Van Hise Hall		241 / 73	19	1967	Tallest building on the University of Wisconsin–Madison campus, and the highest building in the city based on elevation. One of the 60 tallest education buildings in the world, it is slated to be demolished in 2025 per the university's master plan, this has since been pushed to 2035.
3	Wisconsin Institutes for Medical Research		210 / 64	8	2008	Partially located in Shorewood Hills.
4	UW Atmospheric Oceanic & Space Sciences Building		204 / 62	15	1966	The height of the building does not reflect the GOES satellite dishes, weather stations, power/communication units and workstations, or a POES satellite receiver located on the top of the building.
5	UW Engineering Research Building		195 / 59	14	1968	
6	State Office Building		177 / 54	13	1939	Tallest office building on the Madison isthmus.
7	151 East Wilson		172 / 52	14	2018	
8	University Square Office Building		164 / 50	12	2008	Located between University Avenue and Johnson Street at Lake Street, the complex consists of three parts: a 2-story retail mall; a 10-story apartment tower; and a 9-story office tower owned by the University of Wisconsin–Madison.
9	Ovation 309		162 / 50	14	2015	Located on W. Johnson Street near the intersection of State Street.
10	Edgewater Hotel		159 / 48	15	1945	A remodeling of the Edgewater was completed in 2014. The new tower's height is 160 feet.
11	The Constellation Apartments		158 / 48	14	2014	Located in the rapidly growing Capitol East District.
12	The Galaxie		158 / 48	14	2016	Located in the rapidly growing Capitol East District.
13	One Hundred Wisconsin Avenue		157.07 / 47.8	12	2004	Located on the capitol square, this mixed-use building features retail, office (floors 1–4), and luxury condominiums (floors 5–12). Received the highest ratings ever given by the city's Urban Design Commission. The design includes white bethel granite (the same as the state Capitol Building), limestone from a Mississippi River ledge, floor to ceiling glass, and copper.
14	Nolen Shore		149 / 45	12	2006	Named for John Nolen, Madison's landscape architect in the early 20th century.
15	The Loraine		143 / 43	10	1925	Originally built as a hotel, the building now houses condos. It was added to the National Register of Historic Places in 2002.
16	The Lux		143 / 43	12	2016	
17	Belmont Hotel/YWCA		140 / 42	11	1924	The building's height instigated Madison's current height restriction.
18	Metropolitan Place 2		135 / 41	13	2007	
19	Hovde Building		134 / 41	10	1928	
20	Churchill Building		134 / 41	9	1915	Madison's first skyscraper and at the time of its construction the tallest building in Wisconsin outside of Milwaukee. Its erection led to a 90-foot (27 m) height limit for buildings around the Capitol that was struck down by the Wisconsin Supreme Court in 1923, allowing for the construction of the Belmont Hotel.
21	City View		134 / 41	12	2014	
22	309 West Washington		133 / 41	11	2008	
23	The Lyric		132 / 41	11	2017	Located in the rapidly growing Capitol East District.
24	Hyatt Place Madison Downtown		126 / 38	11	2010	
25	Tenney Plaza (aka The Tenney Building)		125 / 38	10	1929	A 10-story art deco building designed by Law, Law & Potter that was Madison's first steel building.
26	Weston Place		122/37	12	2005	High-rise condo building on Madison's west side.
27	Capitol Centre Apartments building I & 2		119 / 36	16	1982	High-rise apartment building in downtown Madison.
28	Oakwood Village tower		118 / 36	15	1975	Located on the west side of Madison, this senior living center is the one of only two entries on this list located outside of the downtown and campus areas.
