= American Exchange Bank =

- U.S. National Register of Historic Places
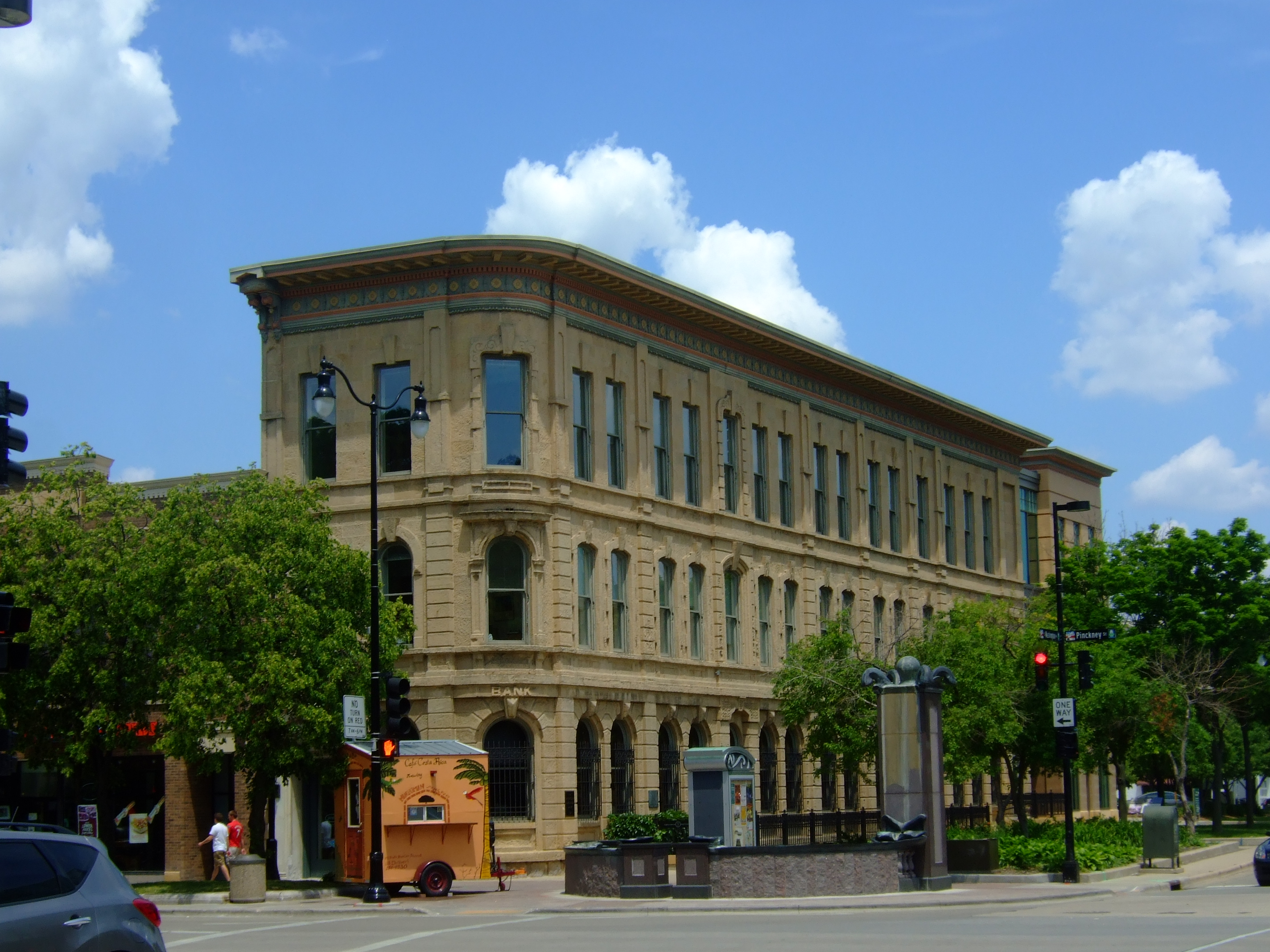
- American Exchange Bank
- Location: 1 N. Pinckney St. Madison, Wisconsin
- Architect: Stephen V. Shipman
- Architectural style: Italianate
- NRHP reference No.: 80000115
- Added to NRHP: August 18, 1980

The American Exchange Bank is an Italian Renaissance Revival-style business block built in 1871 in Madison, Wisconsin, and is one of the last such structures left on the Capitol Square. It was added to the National Register of Historic Places in 1980. The bank was also designated a landmark by the Madison Landmarks Commission in 1975.

== History ==
The third session of Wisconsin's territorial legislature met on this site in 1838 in a hotel called the American Hotel, before the American Exchange Bank existed. The first session of that legislature had met in 1836 in Belmont, but many of the delegates were unhappy with the spartan accommodations in the hastily-thrown-up first capital in November and December. Some refused to meet again at Belmont, so the second session met in 1837 in Burlington, Iowa. They probably would have met again in Burlington in 1838, but Iowa became a separate territory that year, so they were forced to move to Madison. The first capitol building in the new Madison City was not ready yet, so they met in the American Hotel, which had just been built on this site in 1838.

Thirty years later, after the American Hotel was destroyed by fire, Dr. J.E. Baker hired Colonel Stephan Vaughn Shipman to design a new business block for the site. Shipman was then prominent in Madison, having designed the dome and rotunda of the second state capitol, the Madison Post Office, and the Dane County Courthouse. Sandstone business blocks of three or more stories were common around the Capitol Square starting in the 1850s and that's what Shipman designed. He designed an exterior of Madison sandstone in an Italian Renaissance Revival style tending toward the Romano-Tuscan mode, with a rusticated first story and a massive cornice. The windows are paired, with arches topped with keystones, but a different design at each level. Originally, the cornice was decorated with urns, finials, and small gables, the building reached farther up Pinckney Street, and it didn't extend so far along Washington Street. That 1871 building cost $30,000. Initial occupants were the Park Savings Bank on East Washington, two stores on North Pinkney, and offices above.

In 1881 the First National Bank bought the building. In 1911 they remodeled the building, extending it to the east along East Washington. They removed the urns etc. above the cornice and redid the frieze below. Many of the interior features may date from that remodel, including the gold marble wainscoting and teller's booths and the coppered ceiling.

In 1921 the American Exchange Bank bought the building. it had been founded in 1871 as the Deutsche Bank by John J. Suhr, a German immigrant. Suhr's bank changed its name in 1918, at the height of World War I, to the more palatable American Exchange Bank.

In the 1940s a fire damaged the building and the side up Pinckney Street was demolished, leaving the narrow, truncated building as it stands today. Even so, the American Exchange bank is a survivor of the multi-story sandstone buildings that came to dominate the Capitol Square in the late 1800s.
