= Wisconsin State Capitol =

Capitol building of the U.S. state of Wisconsin

- U.S. National Register of Historic Places
- U.S. National Historic Landmark
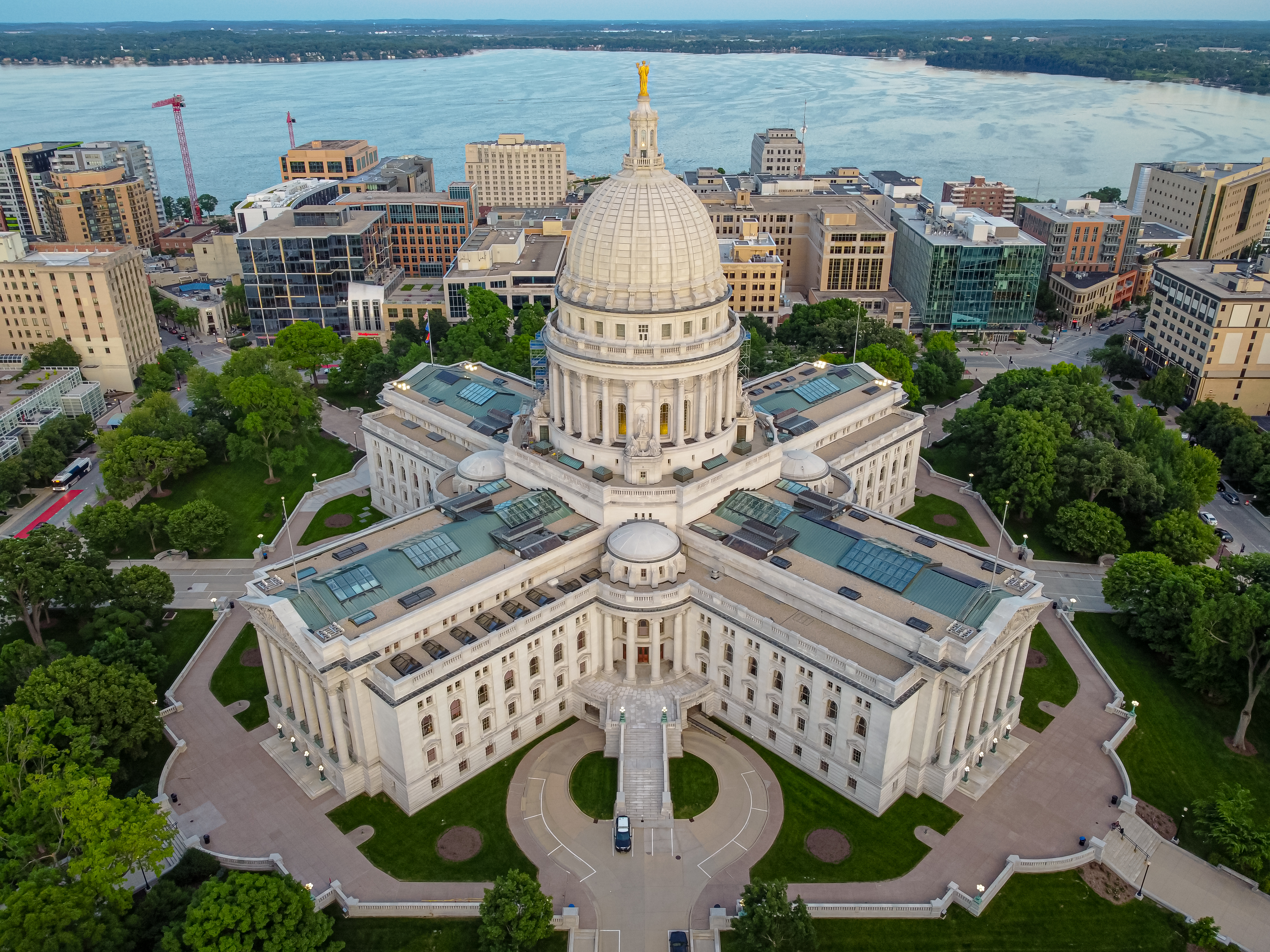
- Interactive map showing the location of Wisconsin State Capitol
- Location: 2 East Main Street, Madison, Wisconsin 53703, US
- Coordinates: 43°04′29″N 89°23′03″W
- Built: 1917; 109 years ago
- Architects: George B. Post, William Stone Post
- Architectural style: Beaux-Arts
- NRHP reference No.: 70000031

Significant dates
- Added to NRHP: October 15, 1970
- Designated NHL: January 3, 2001

The Wisconsin State Capitol, located in Madison, Wisconsin, houses both chambers of the Wisconsin Legislature along with the Wisconsin Supreme Court and the Office of the Governor. Completed in 1917, the building is the fifth to serve as the Wisconsin capitol since the first territorial legislature convened in 1836 and the third building since Wisconsin was granted statehood in 1848. Designed by George B. Post & Sons and advised by Daniel Burnham, the building exemplifies the Beaux-Arts style popular in American public architecture in the two decades following the Chicago World's Fair. The Wisconsin State Capitol is the tallest building in Madison, a distinction that has been preserved by a state law that prohibits buildings within 1 mi (1.6 km) of the Capitol from being taller than the 187 feet (57 m) columns surrounding the dome. The Capitol is located at the southwestern end of the Madison Isthmus in downtown Madison, bordered by streets that make up the Capitol Square.

== First State Capitol, 1838–1863 ==
The first capitol of Wisconsin Territory, upon its separation from Michigan Territory in 1836, was a prefabricated wood-frame council house without heat or water that had been sent hastily to Belmont, the temporary territorial capital. The council house and an associated lodging house still stand and are operated by the Wisconsin Historical Society as the First Capitol Historic Site. Legislators met there for 42 days, tasked with among other things choosing a site for the permanent capital. "Madison City", then an uninhabited plot of land owned by delegate James Duane Doty, was chosen. Until a capitol building had been constructed there, legislative sessions were to be held in Burlington (now part of Iowa).

From the beginning, Doty had laid out the plat of Madison City around a large central square which would house the capitol building. Construction on the first capitol building in Madison began with the laying of the ceremonial cornerstone on July 4, 1837. The building was constructed out of stone cut from Maple Bluff and oak cut locally. It was a small but typical frontier capitol that cost $60,000 to build (equivalent to $1,710,000 in 2025).

In 1838, Iowa Territory was split off from Wisconsin Territory, removing the temporary capital at Burlington from Wisconsin. Since construction on the Madison capitol was well underway, the legislature agreed to meet there beginning on November 26, 1838. However, the building was not completed in time, and for weeks the legislators held their meetings in the basement of the American Hotel. When the legislative chambers were ready, the delegates moved in, only to find that the building still lacked insulation and did nothing to protect them from the freezing winter weather.

Doty was responsible for disbursing the federal funds that were provided to build the Capitol, but several thousand dollars could not be accounted for. Without that federal money, the territorial legislature was forced to issue its own bonds to complete the unfinished building. By the time these bonds were issued in 1841, Doty had been named governor of Wisconsin Territory and began using his position to ensure that Madison would remain the capital.

Unhappy with the quality of the building they had been provided, the legislature considered moving to Milwaukee and having the Madison capitol converted into a penitentiary, although this measure failed. The Capitol's ill-fitting tin dome led the inadequate structure to be derisively nicknamed "Doty's Washbowl". Work continued on the building on and off until 1844, and the cost of the construction was double the amount the legislature had authorized. To keep the capitol in Madison, the owner of the Madison Hotel offered free room and board to legislators. As conditions improved, the calls to move the legislative seat eventually subsided.

Madison in its early years had a reputation as a lawless frontier town, where gambling and heavy drinking were rampant, and the Capitol was not immune, as its legislators often partook in these activities. In 1842, during a heated argument over the appointment of a sheriff in Grant County, delegate James Russell Vineyard shot and killed Charles C. P. Arndt on the floor of the Wisconsin Territorial Council chamber in the Capitol. Vineyard was indicted for murder in the same building but was ultimately acquitted. Charles Dickens (who had been doing a lecture tour of the United States at the time of the incident) described the attack as an example of the violent depravity of American culture in his American Notes for General Circulation.

As Wisconsin Territory prepared to become a state, the Capitol was the site of its two constitutional conventions in 1846 and 1847. The state constitution drafted at the 1846 convention was rejected by voters, but the second constitution was successful and remains the governing document of the state today. When Wisconsin was granted statehood on May 29, 1848, the 1837 building remained in use, becoming the first Wisconsin state capitol. Since it lacked enough space for the new state government apparatus, the state began renting rooms in nearby buildings until a replacement could be built.

== Second State Capitol, 1857–1904 ==
=== Construction ===
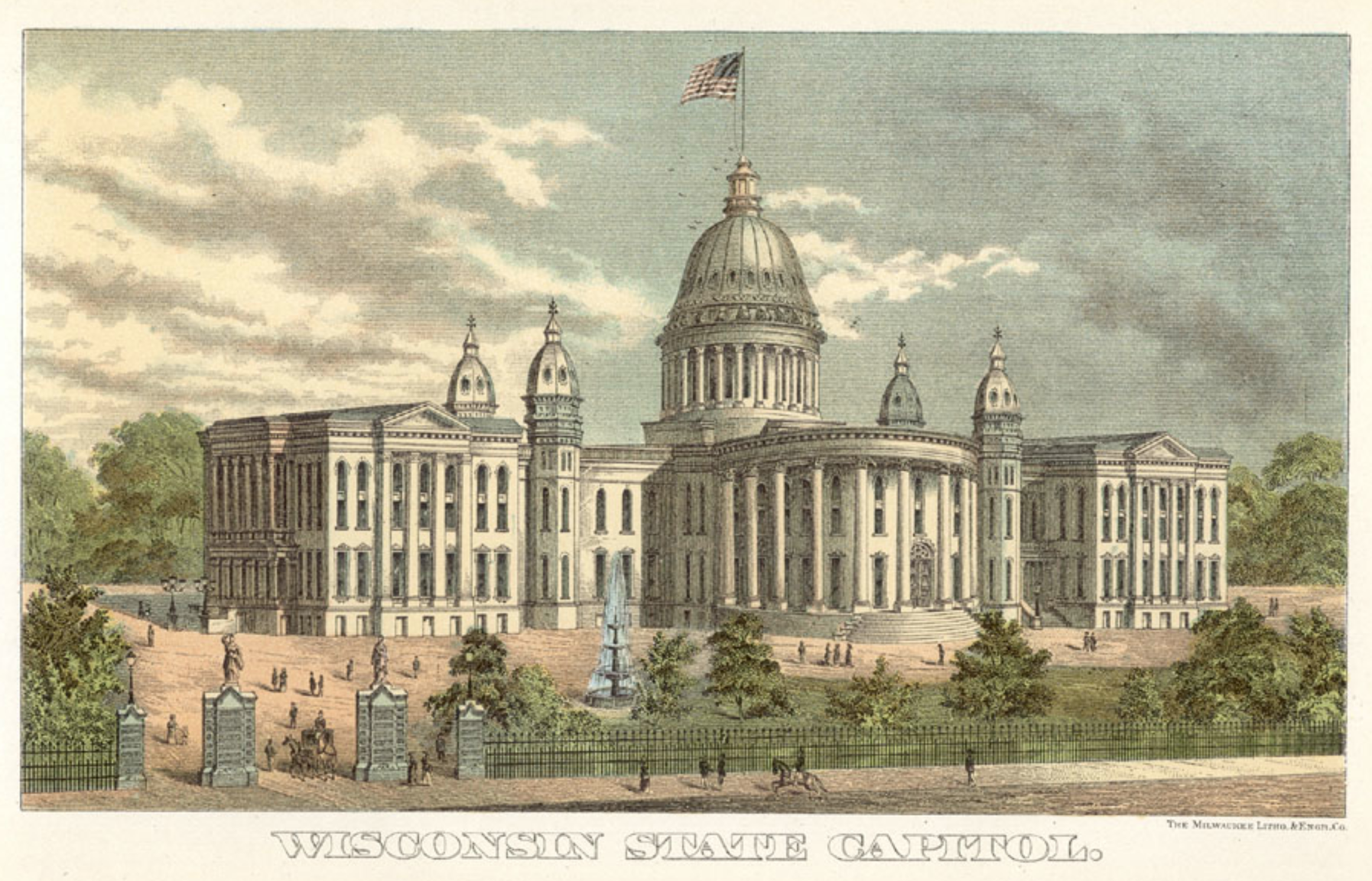
The old Wisconsin State Capitol, 1887

On January 15, 1857, Governor Coles Bashford wrote to the legislature that the existing Capitol was inadequate in size for the growing state and that it lacked fireproof storage facilities for state records. He suggested that the Capitol should either be renovated or relocated, possibly to a different city. To prevent such a move, in a campaign led by Horace A. Tenney, the city of Madison offered to cover most of the costs of a $100,000 expansion (equivalent to $3,500,000 in 2025) to the Capitol, asking the state to spend $25,000 for its part. The state legislature approved the appropriation on February 28, and Madison architects August Kutzbock and Samuel Hunter Donnel were hired to design the annex.

Construction began in July 1857, but progress was slow at first, and little work had been done by early 1858. Upon investigation, a state senate committee discovered that the city actually intended to construct an entirely new capitol on the square, and that the "enlargement" they had approved was only the first of five intended construction phases for a planned $500,000 building. While some state legislators thought this was a needed improvement, others considered the price exorbitant and urged that the capitol be temporarily moved to Milwaukee until a new building could be completed. Many Madisonians feared that if the capitol was moved "temporarily", it would never return to Madison.

A heated debate ensued in the state legislature. The city of Milwaukee offered to provide the legislators with free apartments if they moved the capitol. The city of Madison, despite having taken on substantial debt to build the capitol "annex" and other public projects, and suffering from the nationwide economic Panic of 1857, offered them free use of the new City Hall building (a promise the city was later forced by its debt to withdraw). When the proposed Milwaukee move was put to a vote in the State Assembly on May 15, 1858, the bill passed with 41 in favor and 38 opposed. However, Assemblyman James H. Knowlton, who had voted for the bill, made a speech against it and then asked that the bill be reconsidered. The motion to reconsider passed by one vote, the total being 39–38. On the second vote, Knowlton and two other assemblymen changed their votes, while some other members who had been absent for the first vote joined in, leading to a total of 41 votes in favor and 41 against. Since the vote was tied, the bill was not adopted, and Madison remained the state capital.

The first phase of the new building, the East Wing, was completed in 1859. The Assembly promptly moved into the East Wing's large chamber, leaving the Senate in the old building. Construction began on the West Wing in 1861, and while the outbreak of the Civil War caused delays, it was completed in 1862. Demolition of the 1837 building began in May 1863, allowing work on the other three phases (North and South wings and the central rotunda) to begin. The South Wing was completed in January 1866 and was initially used as the offices of the State Historical Society of Wisconsin.

State officials were unsatisfied with the rotunda designed by Kutzbock, instead preferring a larger dome similar in style to the one that had recently been completed atop the United States Capitol. Kutzbock resigned as architect of the Capitol over the issue, and Stephen Vaughn Shipman was brought in to replace him. The building was completed in 1869, with the fourth and final North Wing housing the Wisconsin Supreme Court and the State Library.

Landscape architect Horace Cleveland was appointed by the Wisconsin Board of Park Commissioners in 1872 to design the Capitol Square park surrounding the building. However, the landscaping plan never came to fruition, in part because most of the region's stonemasons were busy rebuilding Chicago after its Great Fire of 1871, and in part because of controversy over the decision to put up an iron fence around the square. Where Cleveland had proposed four fountains and a bandshell, only one fountain was built, a copy of the famed Centennial Fountain in Philadelphia.

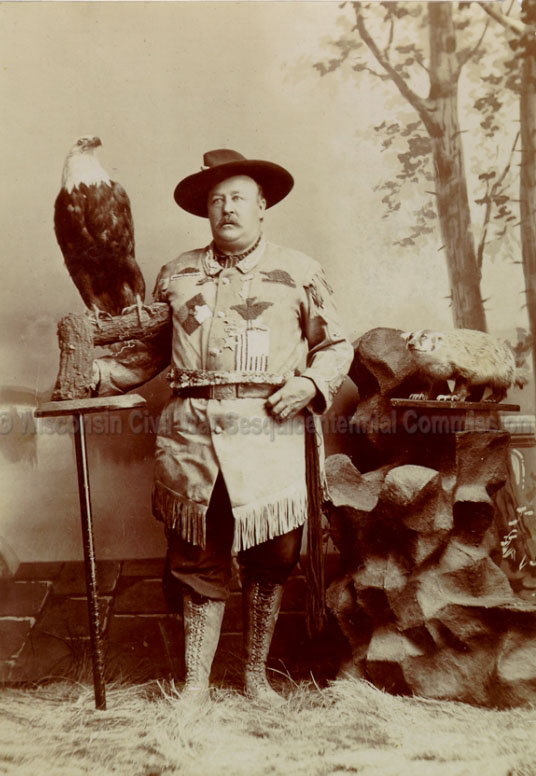
Old Abe with Capitol caretaker George Gilles.

Residing in the Capitol basement during this period was Old Abe, a live bald eagle which had been the mascot of the 8th Wisconsin Infantry Regiment during the Civil War. When the regiment's tour of duty ended in September 1864, the eagle was donated to the state, which set up a two-room apartment for Old Abe and his caretakers. In March 1866, a second eagle given the name "Andy Johnson" was donated to the Capitol by the 49th Wisconsin Infantry Regiment. The two eagles fought numerous times, and Andy died in 1874 after being wounded by Old Abe. Old Abe died in 1881 after inhaling smoke from a small fire in the Capitol basement. His remains were taxidermied and put on permanent display in the Capitol rotunda.

=== Expansion, 1882–1884 ===
Finding that the building had again become inadequate in size, the legislature appropriated $200,000 in 1882 (equivalent to $6,700,000 in 2025) to expand the north and south wings of the Capitol. Plans were drawn up by local architect D. R. Jones. Bidding was opened to contractors, but none of the bidders said that they could complete the requested work within the provided budget. Jones revised his plans twice before Milwaukee builder John Bentley, Bentley's son Thomas, and Oscar F. Nowlan of Janesville submitted a successful bid. Construction was to be completed by the end of 1883.

Construction was nearly complete when, on November 8, 1883, a portion of the south wing extension collapsed, killing five workers and injuring 20 others. Witnesses to the disaster included a young Frank Lloyd Wright, who later wrote that the experience continued to haunt him throughout his life and his career as an architect. The inquest into the cause of the accident was led by Dane County district attorney and future Governor Robert M. La Follette. Jones and Nowlan, as well as Milwaukee architect Henry C. Koch, who had consulted on the design, were found guilty of negligence. Work on the expansions was ultimately completed around November 1884, under the direction of Chicago architect William W. Boyington.

=== Fire ===
In 1903, Governor La Follette established a Capitol Improvement Commission to consider further additions to the Capitol. The commission's immediate goal was to expand the space available for the Supreme Court, then to consider "improvements that will make practically a new statehouse." Prominent architectural firms such as McKim, Mead & White and George B. Post & Sons were invited to submit designs, but declined due to the project's small size and low budget. One who did take an interest was Cass Gilbert, previously the architect of the Minnesota State Capitol.

On the night of February 26, 1904, a gas jet ignited a newly varnished ceiling in the Capitol. Although the building had an advanced fire-fighting system, the nearby University of Wisconsin–Madison's reservoir, which supplied the Capitol, was empty, allowing the fire to spread substantially before the switch to alternative city water supplies could be made. Madison firefighters could not handle the blaze on their own, so additional men and equipment had to be brought from Milwaukee. The effectiveness of the reinforcements was initially hampered by very cold temperatures; by the time they reached Madison, their equipment had frozen and needed to be thawed. As a result, the entire structure, except the north wing, was completely gutted. Numerous records, books, and historical artifacts were lost, including the mount of Old Abe, a Civil War mascot. However, through the efforts of university students, much of the state law library was saved. The priceless artifacts collected by the State Historical Society were unaffected, as that agency had moved into a new building of its own in 1900. The fire occurred just after the state legislature had voted to cancel the Capitol's fire insurance policy in favor of a State Insurance Fund as a cost-saving measure, resulting in unprotected losses of nearly one million dollars.

== Current building ==
=== Construction, 1906–1917 ===
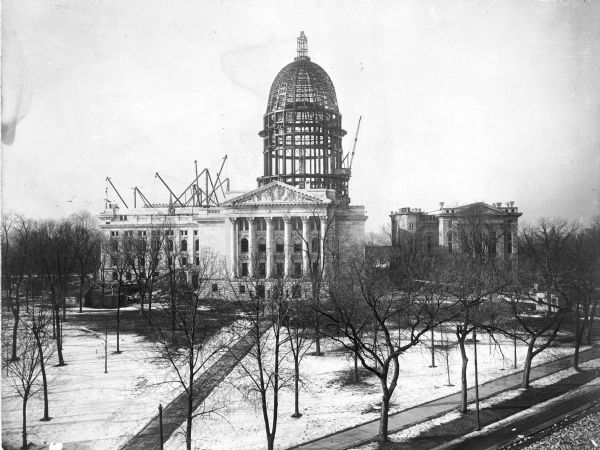
The Capitol under construction, circa 1911. The east wing faces the camera, while the surviving north wing of the old building is visible to the right.

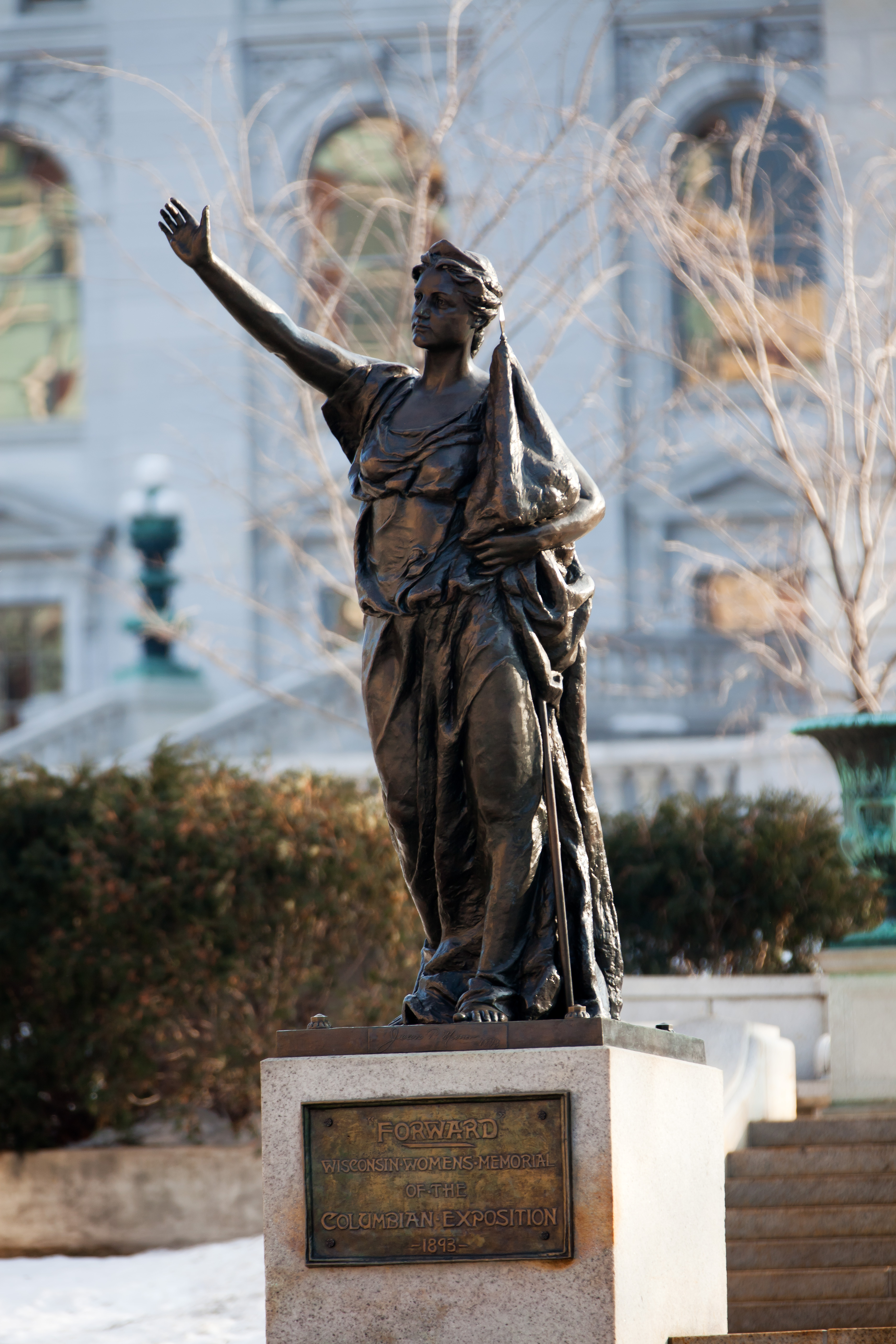
Forward by Jean P. Miner

Within days of the fire, the Capitol Improvement Commission began to discuss restoring and rebuilding the damaged Capitol. The surviving portions of the building were sufficient, although cramped, to allow legislative and judicial business to continue. UW engineering professor and architect Allan Conover was responsible for choosing an architect, and in November 1904, he selected Cass Gilbert. However, competing architect Henry C. Koch and a state senator who was friends with Koch accused Gilbert of getting the job by corrupt means. Offended by the accusations, Gilbert gave up and did not pursue the opportunity further.

At the same time, given the extent of the damage and the growing inadequacy of the former Capitol, the scope of the task was expanded. Governor La Follette requested $3 million (equivalent to $107 million in 2025) from the legislature for the construction of an entirely new Capitol, and a design competition was held in February 1906 to select an architect. Chicago city planner Daniel Burnham made a consultant report on the competition, which was ultimately won by George B. Post & Sons of New York. The legislature required Post's new building to follow the same X-shaped pattern with four wings as the one it was replacing. He made the Capitol look the same on every side so that none of the businesses on the Square felt that they were on the back side. Post's design for the Capitol was substantially similar to a design he had come up with for a "Museum of Living History" in New York City, proposed in 1899 but never built.

As with the previous building decades earlier, construction proceeded in stages so that the surviving portions of the old building could be used for as long as possible. The first stage was the new west wing, which would contain the Assembly chamber. Demolition of the old burned-out west wing began on August 10, 1906. This completed, excavation of the foundation began on October 12. Laying of the first stone of the new Capitol, a one-ton block of Woodbury granite, was delayed several times but ultimately occurred on August 20, 1907. The west wing was completed in time for the opening session of the 49th Wisconsin Legislature on January 13, 1909, although some assemblymen were unhappy with the small size of the new chamber and asked to switch places with the Senate.

Construction of the second phase, the east wing housing the state supreme court and other offices, ran from 1908 to 1910. Work on the central portion of the building, including the rotunda and the foundations for the building's new dome, followed between 1910 and 1913. It was proposed that the old Capitol's damaged dome would be donated to the University, restored, and placed on top of Main Hall (now known as Bascom Hall), but this offer was rescinded when it was determined that the dome was too heavy for the building to support. The old dome laid behind Main Hall until it was sold for scrap in 1915.

Work on the south wing, housing the Senate chamber, began in 1909 and was completed in time for the opening of the 51st Wisconsin Legislature in January 1913. Governor Francis E. McGovern proudly hosted a Conference of Governors in the mostly-finished building in November 1914, showing off to the other 47 states what McGovern believed was the most complete state government facility in the nation.

The building was topped out when the statue of Wisconsin was hoisted onto its pedestal atop the dome on July 20, 1914. Interior work on the Capitol dome, and the installation of the Resources of Wisconsin mural, was completed in time for the opening of the 52nd Wisconsin Legislature on January 13, 1915.

The final portion of the building, the north wing, began construction in 1914 and was completed in the spring of 1917. The Capitol Building Commission was dissolved in July 1917, having spent $7.25 million to construct the entire building (equivalent to $188 million in 2025). Because of the United States' entry into World War I, some of the finer details intended for the Capitol were never completed, and no formal dedication ceremony for the finished building was held.

=== History of use ===
In its early years, the Capitol housed most of the state government's agencies in addition to the legislative and judicial chambers and offices. Since the legislature typically only met for about six months of each two-year term, the legislative offices would be used by various executive departments when the sessions were over. This situation continued until the State Office Building was completed in 1931, allowing many executive departments to move out.

During the 1950s and 1960s, the building became increasingly devoted to the legislative branch. The 75th Wisconsin Legislature became the state's first session to continue for the entire two-year term in 1962. Each of the state's 132 legislators eventually received their own office in the Capitol and a permanent staff. More space was made available by the construction of the Hill Farms State Office Building in 1964.

The exterior of the Capitol was chemically cleaned in 1965, and renovations were made to the interior and grounds. Noticing that the building had never had a dedication ceremony when it was finished in 1917, Governor Warren Knowles marked the completion of the cleaning by finally formally dedicating the building on July 7, 1965.

=== Restoration ===
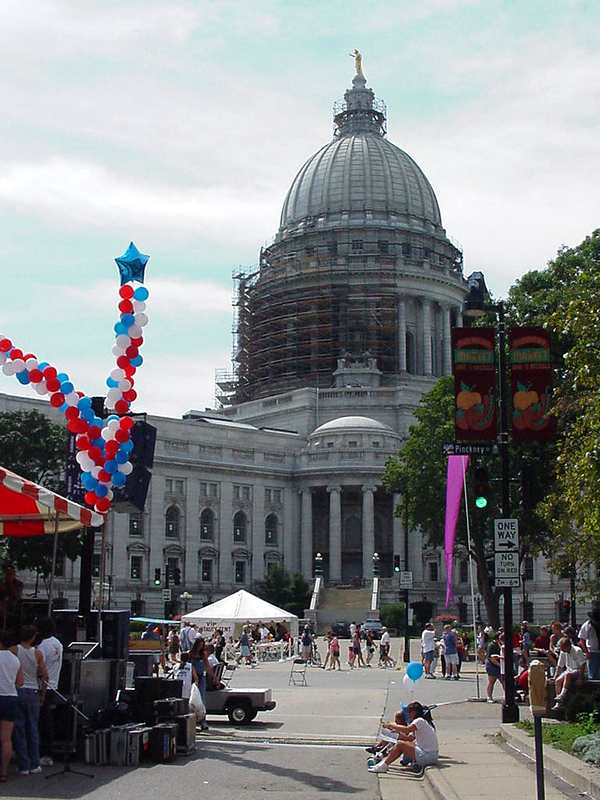
Scaffolding covers the southeast side of the rotunda during the restoration of the building's exterior. The surrounding park, shown here hosting Taste of Madison in 2000, is the location for many downtown events.

From 1988 to 2002, the capitol underwent a renovation and restoration project costing $158.8 million (equivalent to $284 million in 2025). The project was performed wing by wing, the same as the original construction of the capitol. The purpose of the project was to convert the capitol into a modern working building, while restoring and preserving its original 1917 appearance. Remodeling projects of the 1960s and 70s had introduced features out of character with the architecture of the building, such as dropped ceilings, movable partitions and fluorescent light fixtures, and many original decorative stencils were painted over. The restoration project returned public spaces to their original appearance. Original decorative stencils were repaired. Stairs which had been sealed during the 1970s were uncovered. The exterior granite was cleaned and repaired by workers who rappelled down from the dome. The renovation plan also included integrating modern technology into the original architecture. Electrical, mechanical (such as plumbing and heating), and communications systems were upgraded; asbestos was removed, and air conditioning was added. The Capitol basement floor was lowered two feet to provide additional usable office space. Legislative offices were rebuilt as two-room suites (originally legislators did not have offices in the capitol, only their desks in the Senate and Assembly chambers). Modern office furniture was designed to look like the original oak furniture.

As part of the renovations, the Grand Army of the Republic Museum on the fourth floor of the Capitol moved out in 1993, becoming the Wisconsin Veterans Museum on the western corner of Capitol Square. This was the last of many agencies to leave the building, devoting the entire space to the legislature, Supreme Court, and offices of the Governor and Attorney General.

== Architecture ==
=== Design ===
The Capitol is 284 feet 5 inches (86.7 m) tall from the ground floor to the top of the Wisconsin statue on the dome. The Wisconsin statue on the dome was sculpted in 1920 by Daniel Chester French of New York. Its left hand holds a globe surmounted by an eagle and her right arm is outstretched to symbolize the state motto, "Forward". It wears a helmet with the state animal, the badger, on top. It is made of hollow bronze covered with gold leaf. Wisconsin is 15 feet, 5 inches tall and weighs three tons. The statue is commonly misidentified as Lady Forward or Miss Forward, which is the name of another statue on the Capitol grounds.

The capitol ceiling, visible from the center of the building, features Resources of Wisconsin, a mural by Edwin Howland Blashfield. Due to the domed shape of the ceiling, the mural was painted in pieces and was assembled similarly to a jigsaw puzzle. It features a woman sitting on a throne of clouds, representing Wisconsin. Wisconsin is surrounded by other women, wrapped in a large American Flag, who are reaching for goods such as tobacco, lead, and fruits.

The capitol was constructed of 43 types of stone from six countries and eight states. The exterior stone is Bethel white granite from Vermont, making the exterior dome the largest granite dome in the world. The corridor floors, walls and columns are of marble from the states of Tennessee, Missouri, Vermont, Georgia, New York, and Maryland; granite from the states of Wisconsin and Minnesota; and limestone from the states of Minnesota and Illinois. Marble from the countries of France, Italy, Greece, Algeria and Germany, and syenite from Norway are also represented. Other Wisconsin granites are located throughout the public hallways on the ground, first, and second floors.

The building was designated a National Historic Landmark in 2001.

=== Sculpture program ===
Architect Post planned an elaborate sculpture program for the building. Initially the commission for the statue of Wisconsin on the top of the dome was promised to Helen Farnsworth Mears but when Daniel Chester French agreed to produce the finial figure, the commission was switched to him. This work, often referred to as the "Golden Lady", consists of an allegorical figure reminiscent of Athena, dressed in Greek garb, and wearing a helmet topped by a badger, the Wisconsin state totem. In the left hand it holds a globe with an eagle perched on top. Across its chest is a large W, for Wisconsin.

Post's original concept for the building required four small domes to be placed at the base of the large one, but the plans were changed and the domes were replaced by four sculptural groups by Karl Bitter. These groups (again, in Greek clothing) symbolized Faith, Strength, Prosperity and Abundance and Knowledge.

Each of the four wings of the building is fronted by a pediment whose figures relate to the principal activities that were to occur within. Thus the east wing, housing the Supreme Court, features a pediment by Bitter entitled Law; the south has Adolph Alexander Weinman's Virtues and Traits of Character, for the wing containing the State Senate. Bitter's other pediment, the west, is Agriculture, while Attilio Piccirilli's Wisdom and Learning of the World adorns the north pediment. The carving of all these sculptures is attributed to the Piccirilli Brothers.

== Height restriction ==
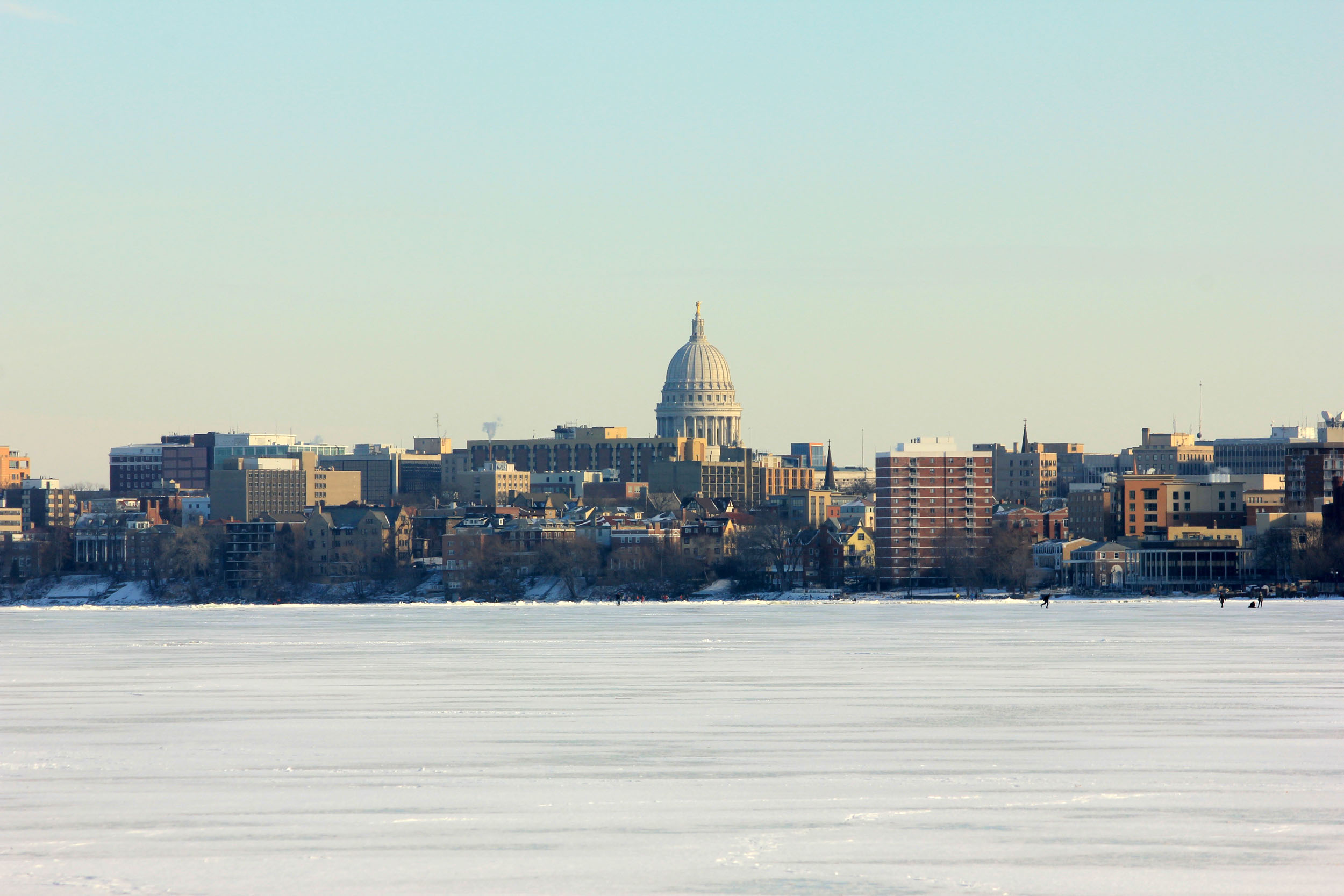
No other buildings in downtown Madison may exceed the height of the columns supporting the Capitol dome.

During the construction of the current Capitol in the 1910s, city planner John Nolen recommended that the height of buildings near the Capitol should be limited. The first building in Madison whose height approached that of the Capitol was the 134-foot (41 m) Gay Building, completed in 1915, leading to concerns that the prominence of the Capitol dome in the city could be diminished.

A Wisconsin state law enacted in 1921 forbade any building higher than 90 feet (27 m) from being erected on any of the blocks surrounding the Capitol Square, "to prevent damage to the state capitol building because of fire hazard". The Madison Capital Times editorial board supported the measure, not only because of the fire hazard but also to prevent "the establishment of a sordid and jagged sky line around the capitol."

The law blocked construction of the proposed 140-foot (43 m) Belmont Hotel and the 143-foot (44 m) Hotel Loraine, whose developers sued the state. The Wisconsin Supreme Court struck down the law in May 1923, on the grounds that it was an unconstitutional taking without just compensation, and the city of Madison was forced to issue permits for the construction of the two hotels.

In July 1923, the state legislature passed a new law setting a maximum height of 100 feet (30 m) for all buildings in the state except in the city of Milwaukee. This law was upheld by the state supreme court, but the Belmont and Loraine hotels were grandfathered in because they had been issued valid construction permits in June. Both hotels opened in 1924, but no new buildings over the limit would be permitted.

The Oscar Mayer company asked for the statewide building height law to be repealed in 1955, since it wanted to expand its meatpacking plant on the East Side of Madison. This request was granted, on the grounds that the city of Madison could continue to protect the view of the Capitol through local ordinances and zoning laws. Mayor George J. Forster promised the legislature that the city would "take care of any tall-building proposals near the Square which would detract from the Capitol."

By 1989, this local ordinance blocked buildings taller than 10 stories within one mile (1.6 km) of the Capitol. In May 1989, Madison mayor Paul Soglin said he would consider the possibility of removing the ordinance, arguing that allowing taller buildings would help to revitalize downtown Madison. In response, state assemblyman William Lorge introduced a bill that would block construction of any building taller than the exterior columns supporting the Capitol dome within four miles (6.4 km) of the Capitol. Lorge said that he would "study the area thoroughly", then modify the bill before passage to establish a specific height limit for every part of the region on a "block-by-block, hill-by-hill basis".

The final bill, enacted in April 1990 and remaining in force today, requires that "no portion of any building or structure located within one mile of the center of the state capitol building may exceed the elevation of 1,032.8 feet [314.8 m] above sea level". This matches the elevation of the base of the pillars surrounding the Capitol dome.

== Fossils ==
Naturally occurring fossils are found throughout the capitol:

- Starfish: North wing, left grand stairs, 1st to 2nd floor, fourth step from bottom
- Coral: West wing, second floor, railing overlooking central corridor, outside of Assembly chamber
- Nautiloid: North wing, second floor, left of north hearing room entrance
- Gastropod: West wing, left grand stairs; 1st to 2nd floor railing, above 9th step from top
- Ammonoid: North wing, second floor, north hearing room
- Bryozoan: South wing, second floor, left grand stairs, top step
- Burrows: Northwest, second floor, wall to right room 225 NW
- Brachiopods: East wing, ground floor, pillars near entrance

== Images ==
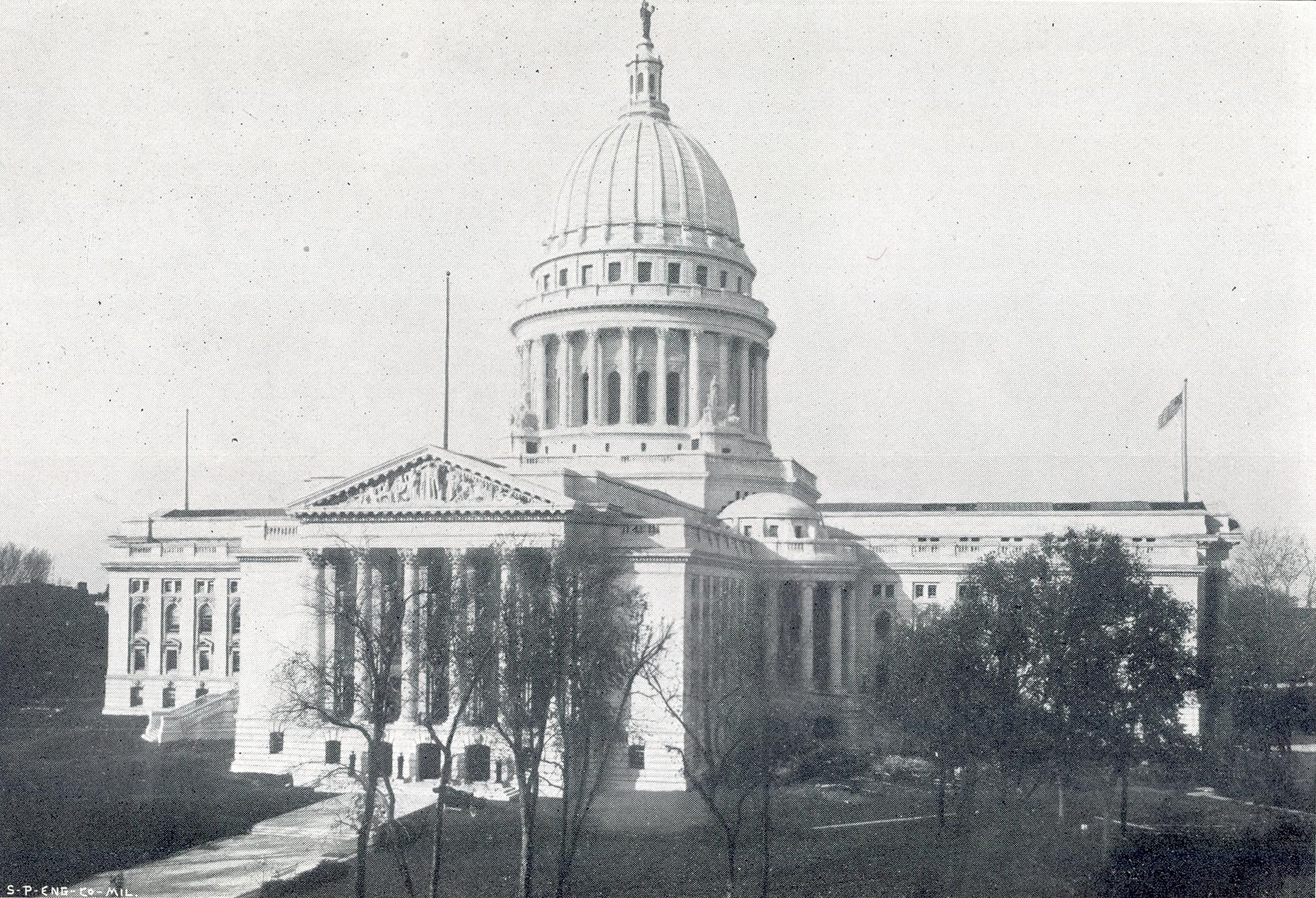
The current building in 1915

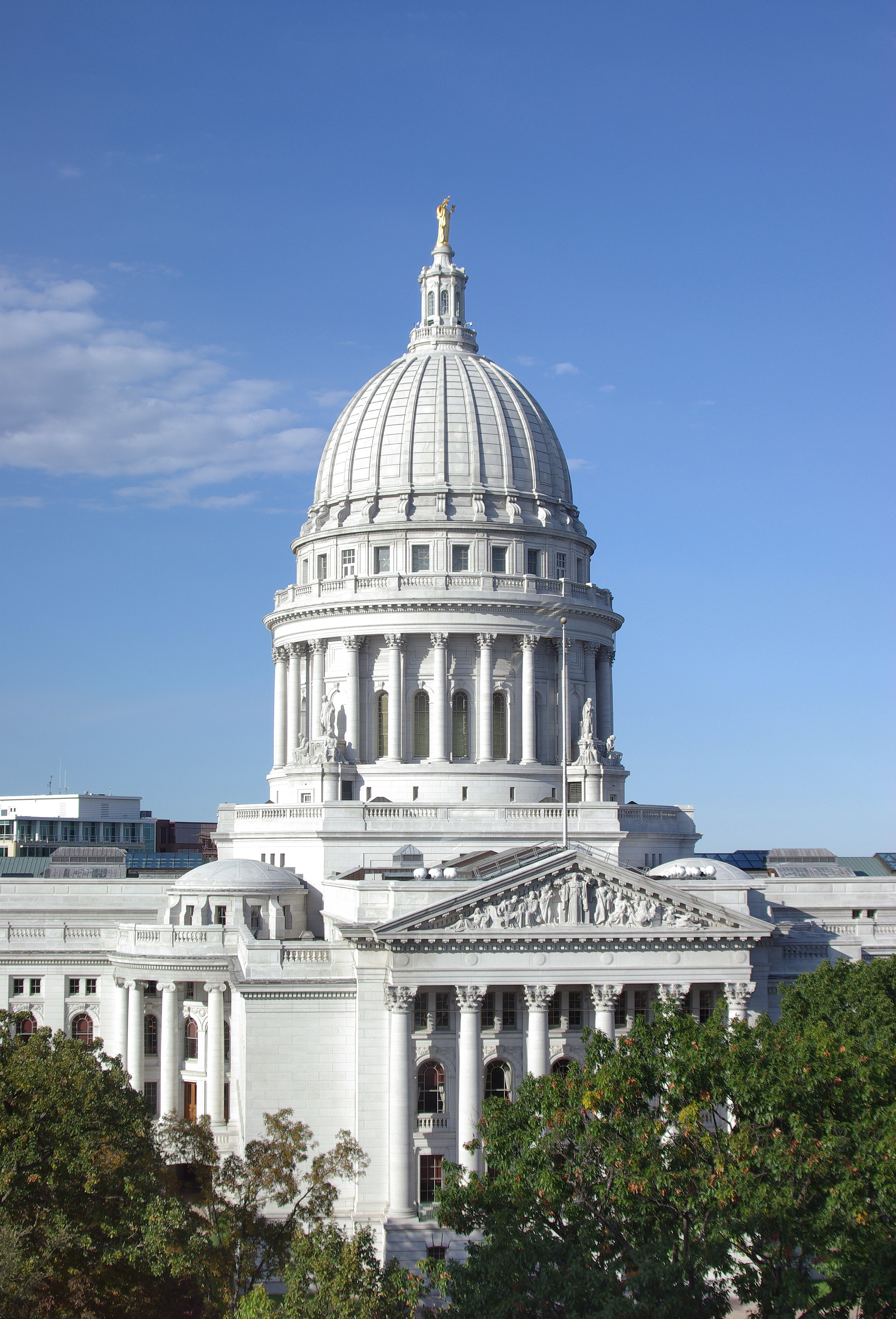
Capitol dome

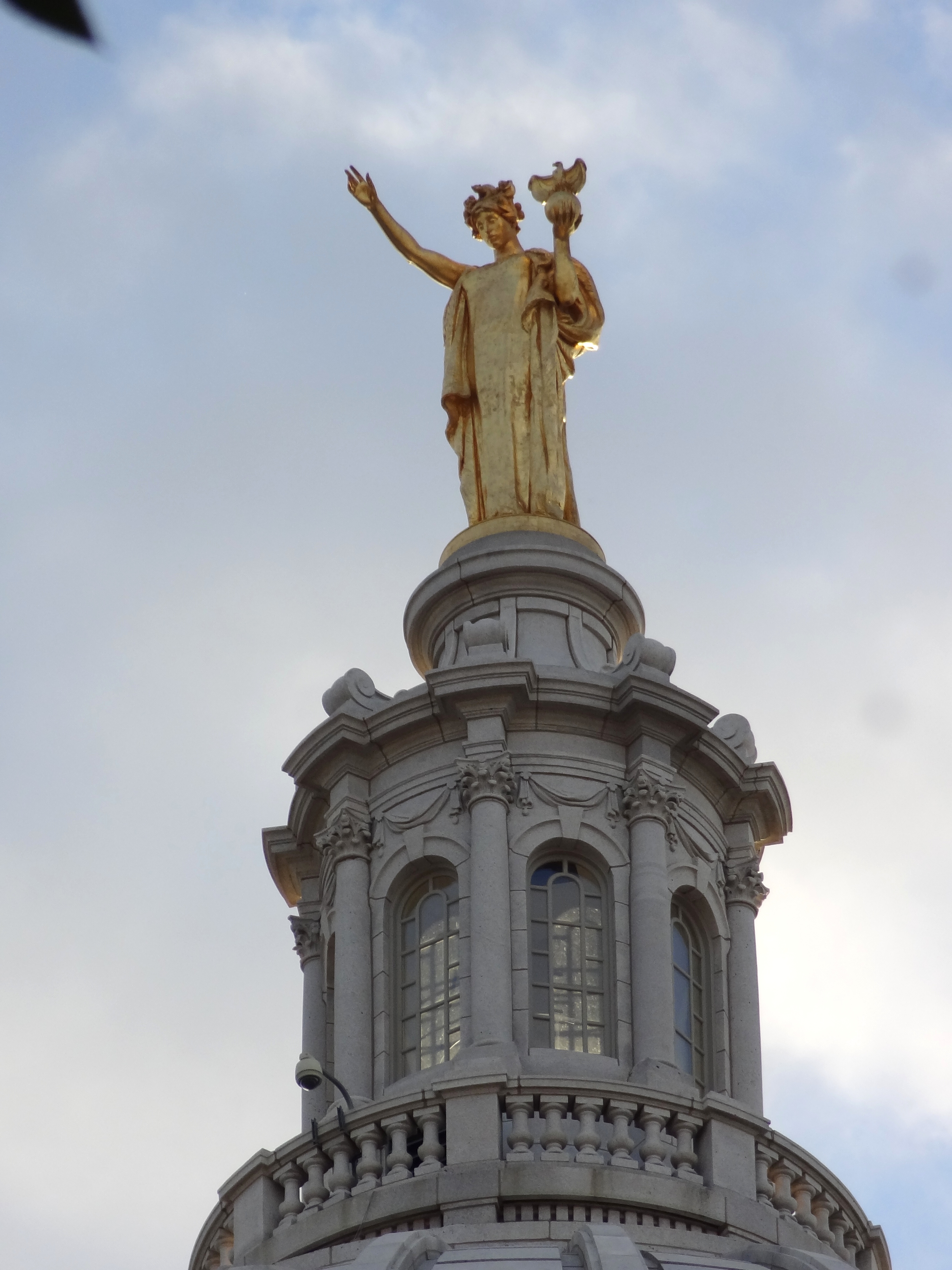
Wisconsin by Daniel Chester French

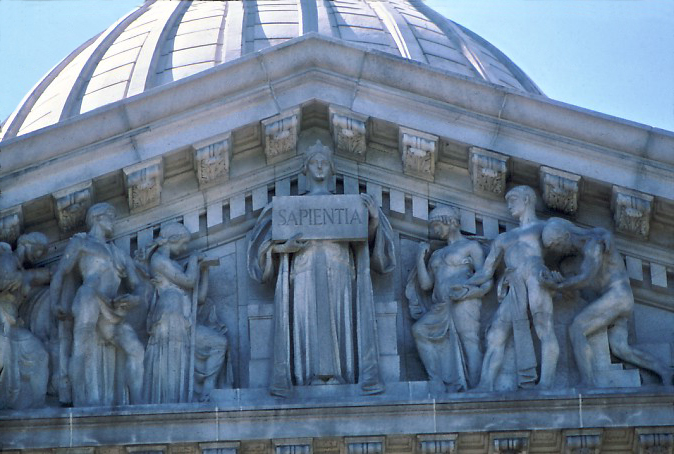
North pediment by Attilio Piccirilli

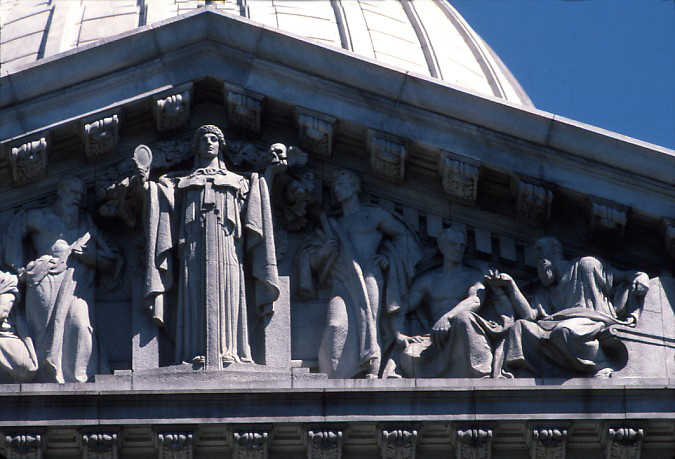
South pediment, Virtues and Traits of Character by Adolph Weinman

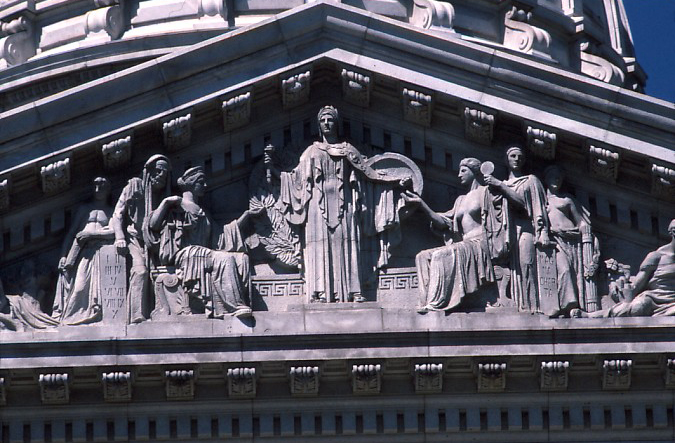
East pediment by Karl Bitter

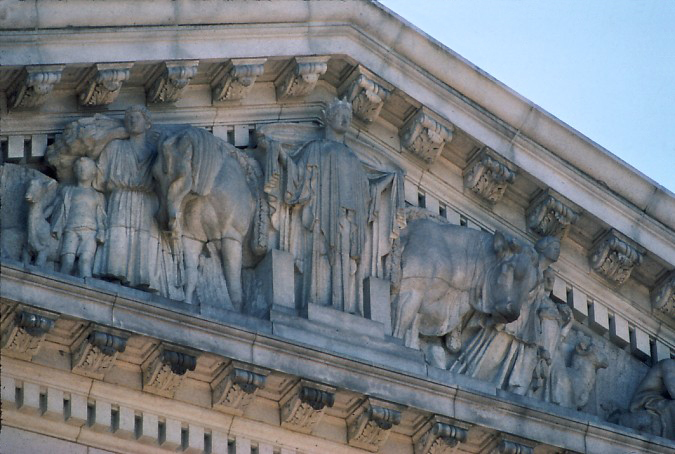
West pediment by Karl Bitter

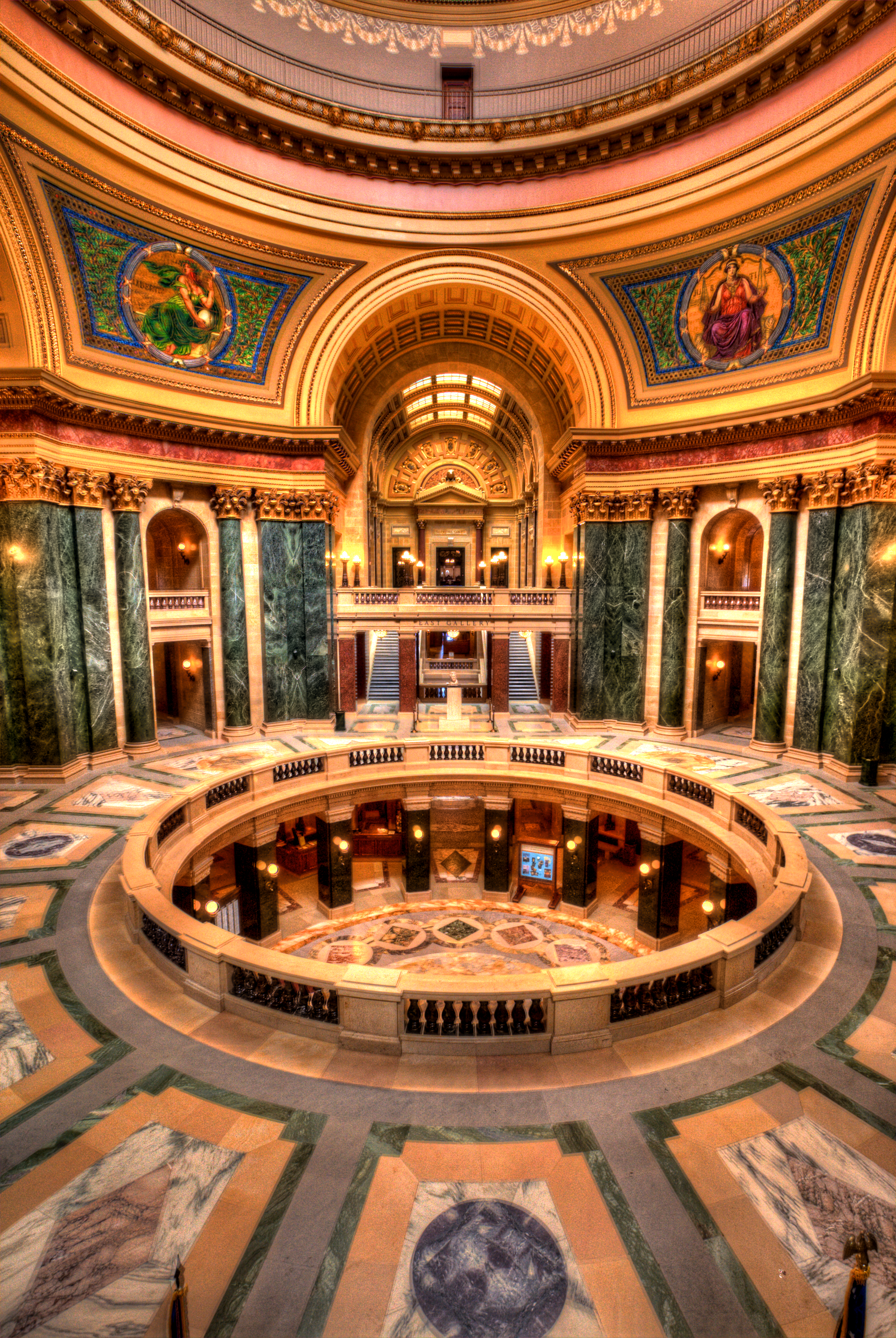
Rotunda floor

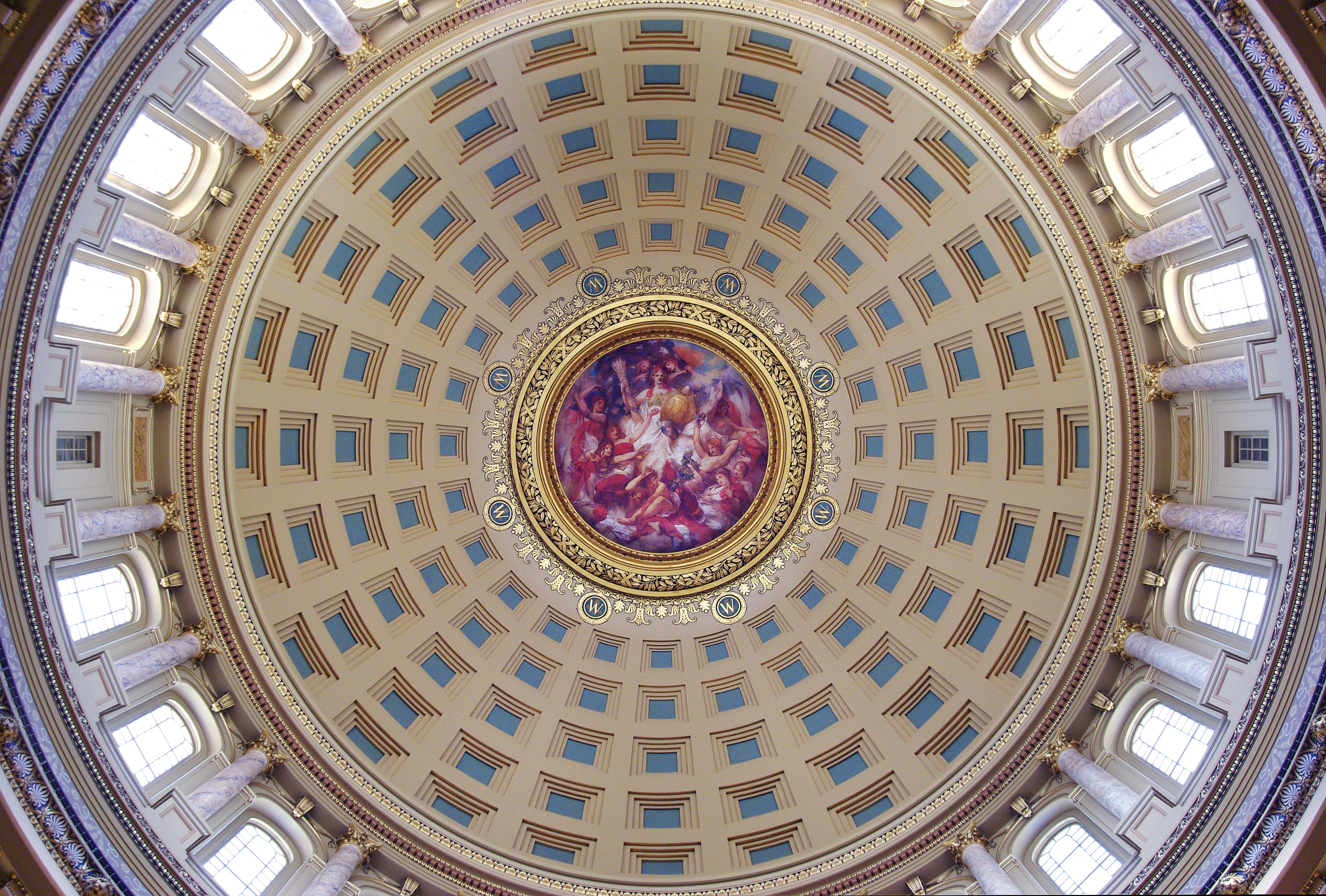
Dome interior

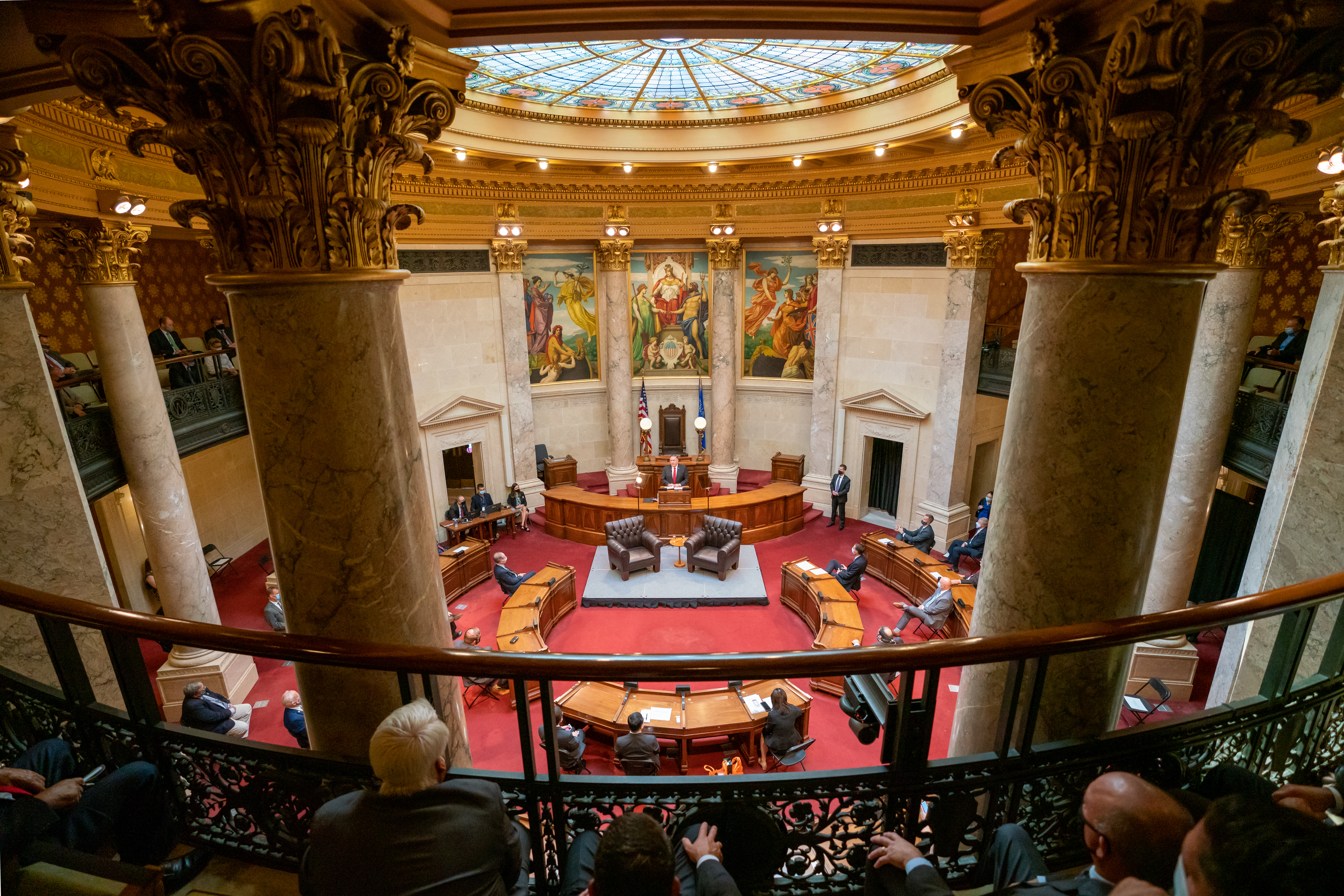
Wisconsin State Senate chambers

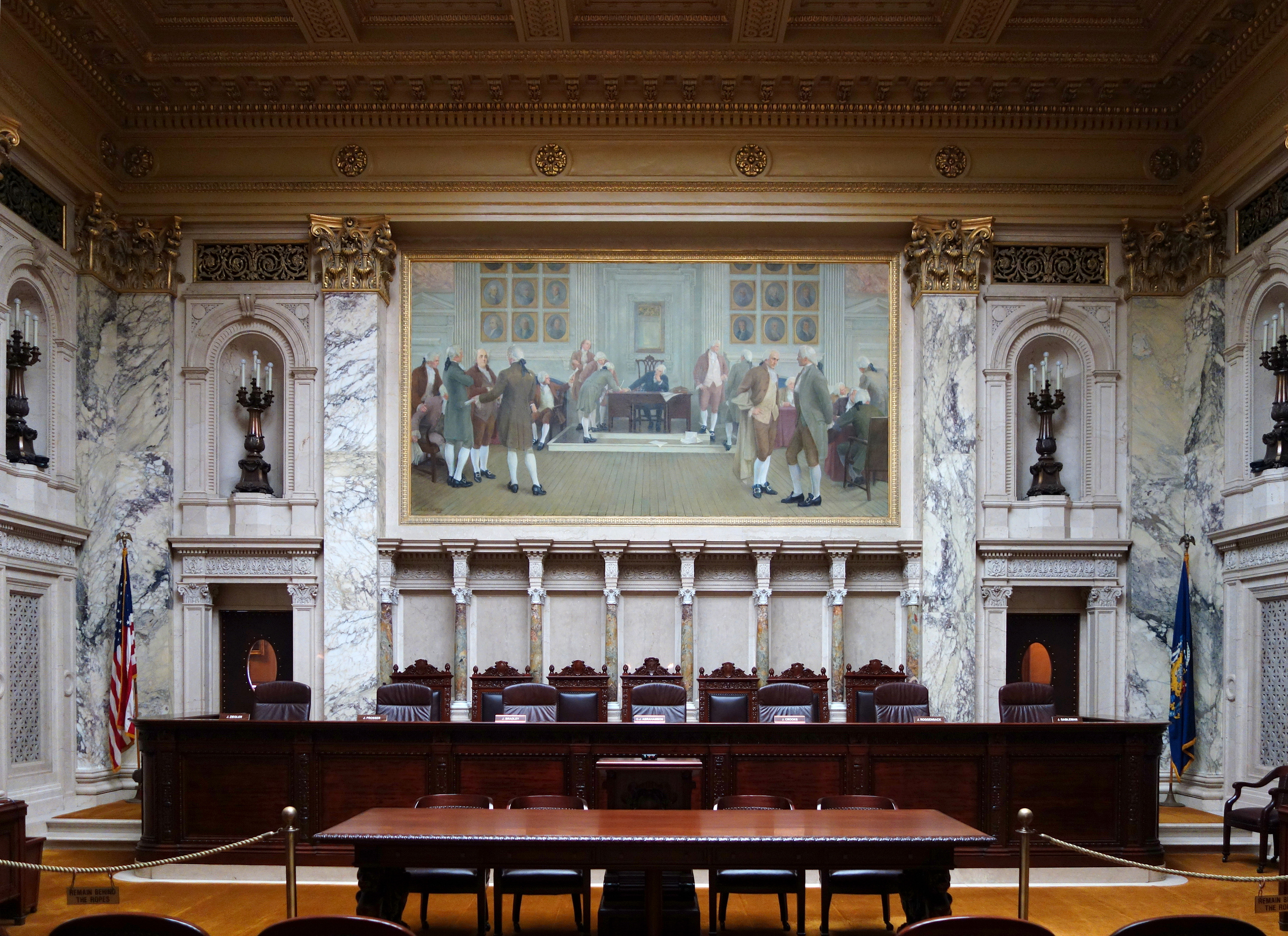
Wisconsin Supreme Court chambers

== See also ==
- List of state and territorial capitols in the United States
- 2011 Wisconsin protests
- National Register of Historic Places listings in Madison, Wisconsin
- List of National Historic Landmarks in Wisconsin
