= University Square (Madison) =

Coordinates: 43°04′22″N 89°23′54″W

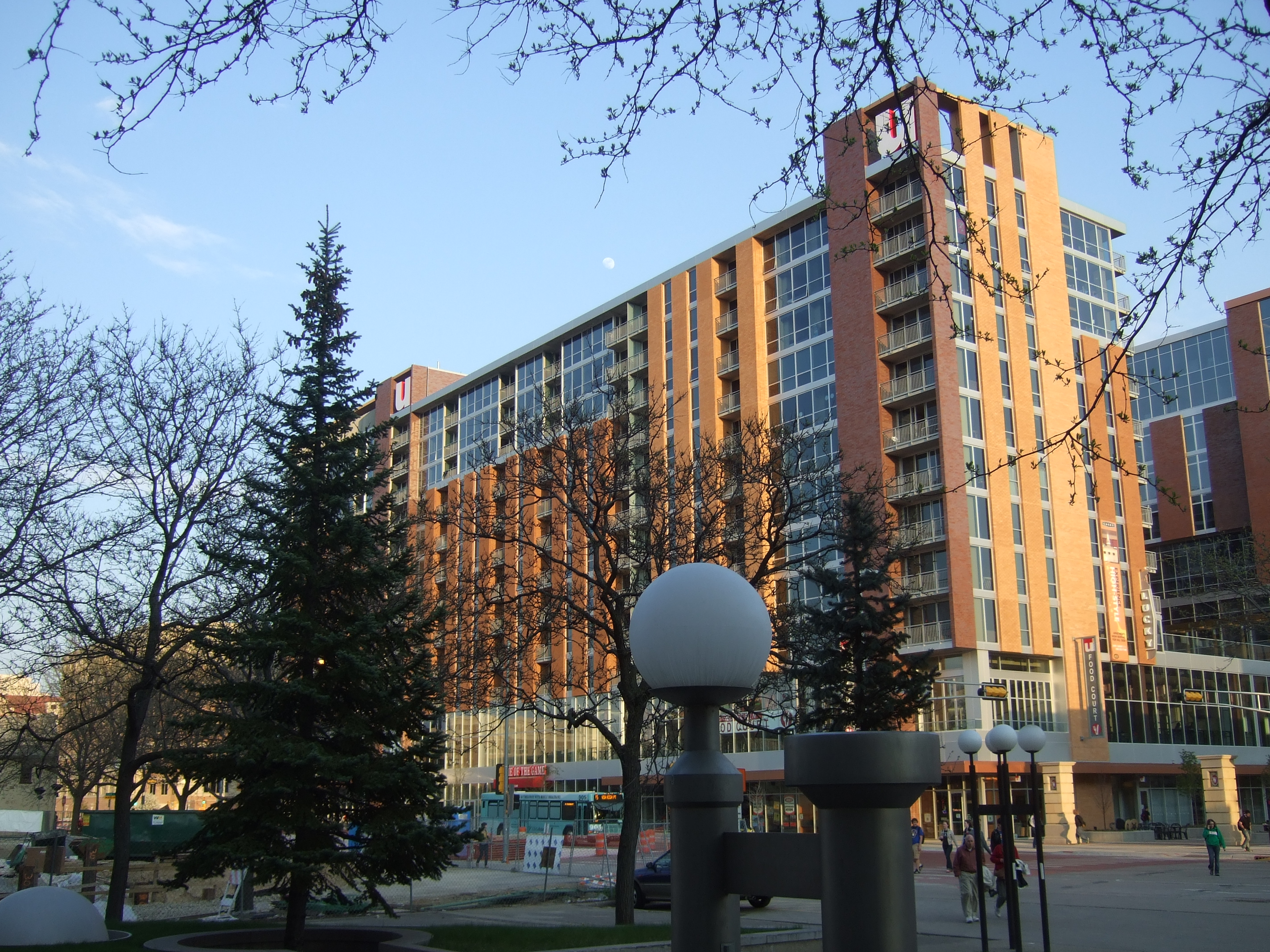
- Location: Madison, Wisconsin
- Address: 324 N. Lake Street
- Developer: Executive Management, Inc
- Owner: University of Wisconsin–Madison
- Architect: Steve Brown apartments
- Floors: 12
- Public transit: Metro Transit

University Square Madison is a 1,100,000-square-foot (100,000 m^{2}) urban infill development in the City of Madison, Wisconsin.

The planning for the University Square Project was started in 1999 by Greg Rice, owner of Executive Management, Inc. Greg chose Potter Lawson, Inc., in 1999 as the architect for the project. After years of planning, construction began on June 2, 2006, and was completed in August, 2008. The developer and majority owner of the project is Executive Management, Inc, a Madison-based development firm, with Steve Brown Apartments and the University of Wisconsin as part owners.

University Square consists of three main parts: a 2-story retail mall owned by Executive Management, Inc; a 10-story apartment tower, Lucky, owned by Steve Brown Apartments; and a 9-story office tower owned by the University of Wisconsin–Madison. It is located off of Johnson Street and University Avenue, and is within a block from Witte Hall and Sellery Hall.

The USquare Food Court previously occupied a large portion of the 2nd floor of University Square and held the National Food Court Eating Championship and the Wisconsin Collegiate Eating Championship. The USquare Food Court closed the following summer. A Buffalo Wild Wings restaurant moved from its State Street location into University Square and opened on August 15, 2011. The former food court is now occupied by UpperHouse, a Christian gathering space.

The university tower portion of the project contains a new Student Activities Center for University student groups, a new home for University Health Services, as well as the Bursar's Office, Registrar's Office, Office of Student Financial Aid, student radio station WSUM, a DoIT Tech Store (where students, faculty, and staff can buy computers, tablets, accessories, and receive service for any university-related technology questions) and other university functions.
