= Churchill Building =

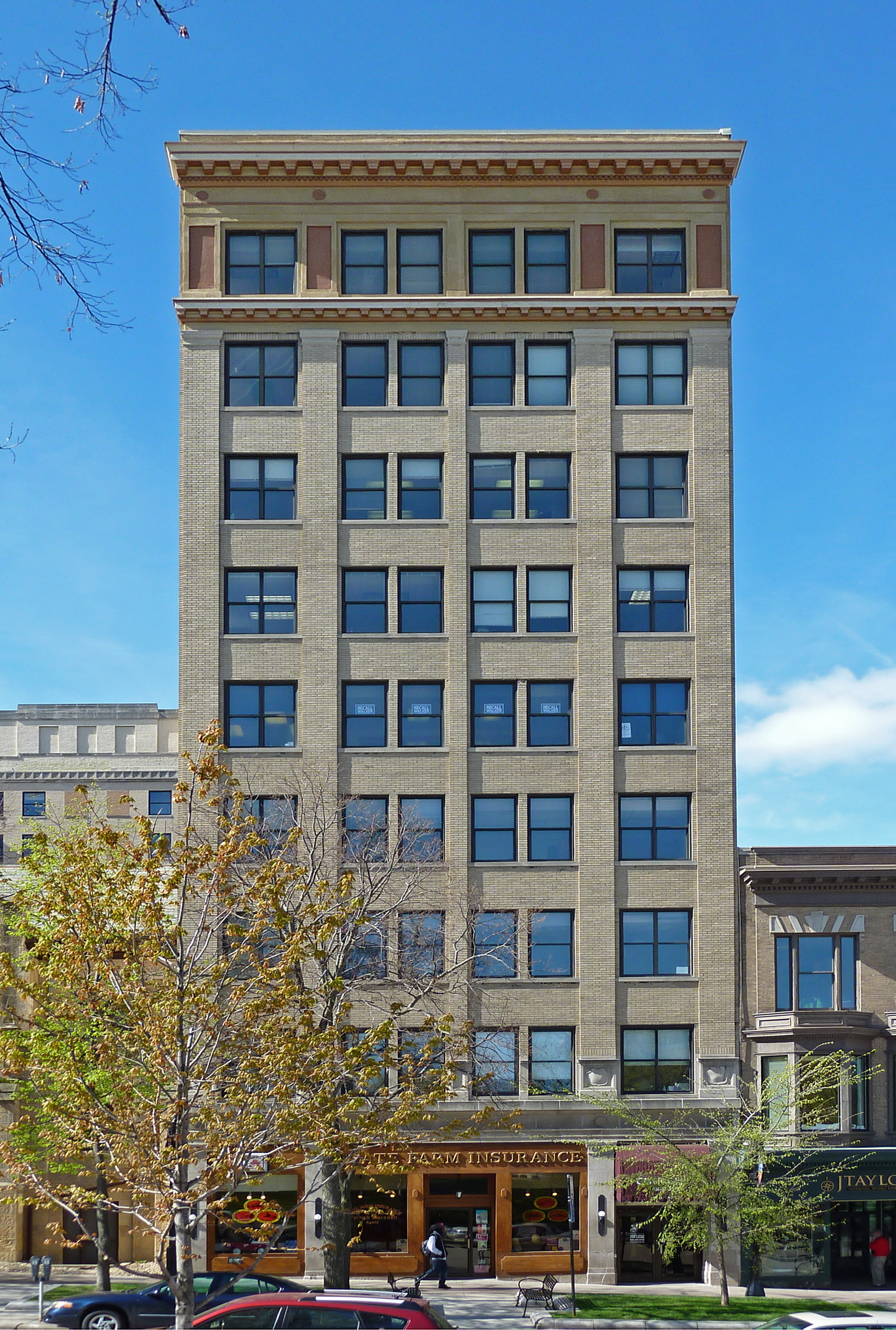

- Location within Wisconsin
- Interactive map showing the location for Churchill Building
- Alternative names: Gay Building

General information
- Status: Completed
- Type: Commercial office
- Architectural style: beaux-arts
- Location: 16 North Carroll Street, Madison, Wisconsin, United States
- Coordinates: 43°04′27″N 89°23′09″W
- Construction started: 1914
- Completed: 1915

Height
- Height: 134 ft (41 m)

Technical details
- Structural system: steel frame
- Floor count: 9
- Lifts/elevators: 2

Design and construction
- Architecture firm: James R. Law

Other information
- Public transit: Metro Transit

The Churchill Building, also known as the Gay Building, is a nine-story, 134-foot-tall (41 m) high-rise building located at 16 North Carroll Street in Madison, Wisconsin. Completed in 1915, it was Madison's first skyscraper. It was the tallest building in Wisconsin outside of Milwaukee, and remained so until 1917 when the Wisconsin State Capitol was completed. The building, like many others built in Madison during the early 1900s, was designed in the Beaux-Arts style.

The building was developed by Leonard Gay, for whom it was originally named, and designed by architect James R. Law, Jr., who later served as mayor of Madison from 1932 to 1943. Because the height of the building interfered with views of the Capitol, its construction drew opposition. The city's landscape architect, John Nolen, led an unsuccessful campaign to stop its construction. After the building was completed, a 90-foot (27 m) height limit was enacted for buildings around the Capitol; as a result, the Gay Building remained Madison's tallest (other than the Capitol) until the Wisconsin Supreme Court struck down the height limit law in 1923, which allowed construction of the taller Belmont Hotel. When the building was completed, there was speculation that extra streetcar service would be needed to handle the increased concentration of people going in and out of the building.

In 1974, developer Don Hovde acquired the building, gutted and renovated it, and changed its name to the Churchill Building. In 2025, the building was added to Wisconsin's Register of Historic Places, and the National Register of Historic Places.

== See also ==
- List of tallest buildings in Madison
