= Madison Isthmus =

Isthmus in Madison, Wisconsin, United States

Coordinates: 43°05′01″N 89°22′18″W

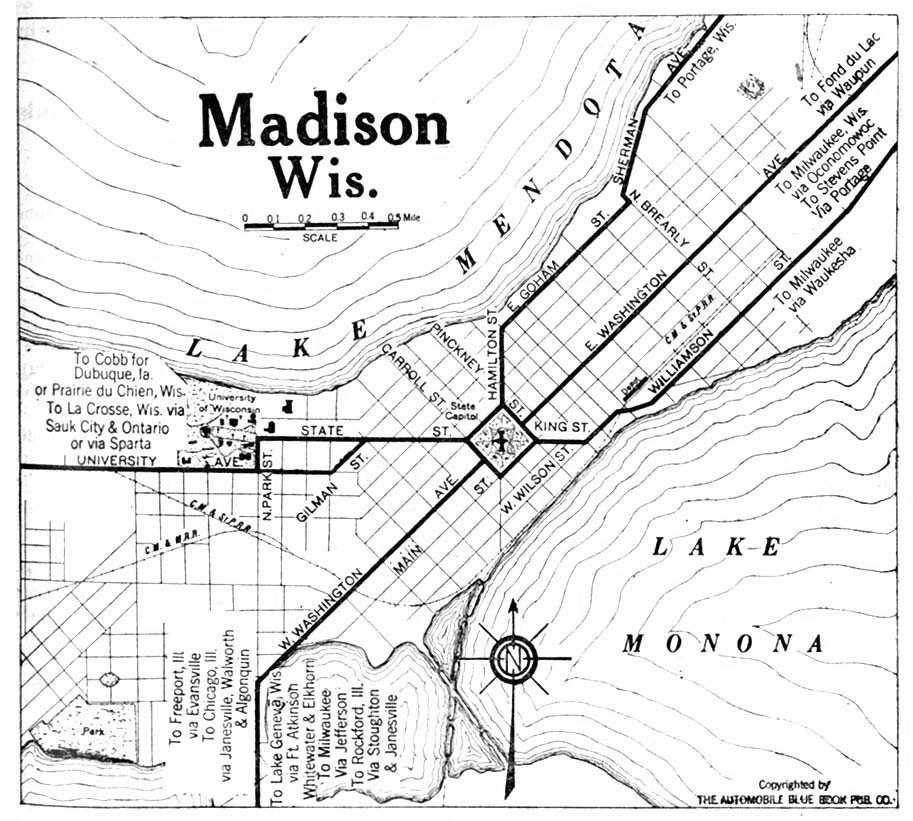
1920 Madison Wisconsin Automobile Blue Book

The Madison Isthmus is where the downtown and near east portion of Madison, Wisconsin is situated, between Lake Mendota and Lake Monona. It is located between Madison's northeast side to the east and the University of Wisconsin campus to the west.

== History ==
After visiting the area in 1829, land speculator and judge James Duane Doty purchased 1,200 acres (490 ha) of land on the isthmus. By 1836 Doty had convinced the Wisconsin Territory legislature to relocate the capital to the site from its original location in Belmont. Construction of the Capitol began the following year, in 1837.

== Physical characteristics ==
The southwestern portion of the Isthmus is home to the Wisconsin State Capitol, State Street, and Madison's main business and financial districts. The Yahara River crosses the isthmus at its northeastern end, connecting Lake Mendota to Lake Monona.

The street grid within the isthmus is laid out in a southwest-to-northeast pattern. Three main arterial roads connect east and west Madison along the Isthmus: U.S. Highway 151 (US 151, East Washington Avenue), East Johnson Street, and East Gorham Street. The Williamson (Willy) Street business district is also located completely on the isthmus.

Madison is one of two major U.S. cities built on an isthmus, the other being Seattle, Washington.

== See also ==
- Isthmus — a free weekly alternative newspaper distributed throughout Dane County
