= Dane County Courthouse =

Coordinates: 43.0712°N 89.3839°W

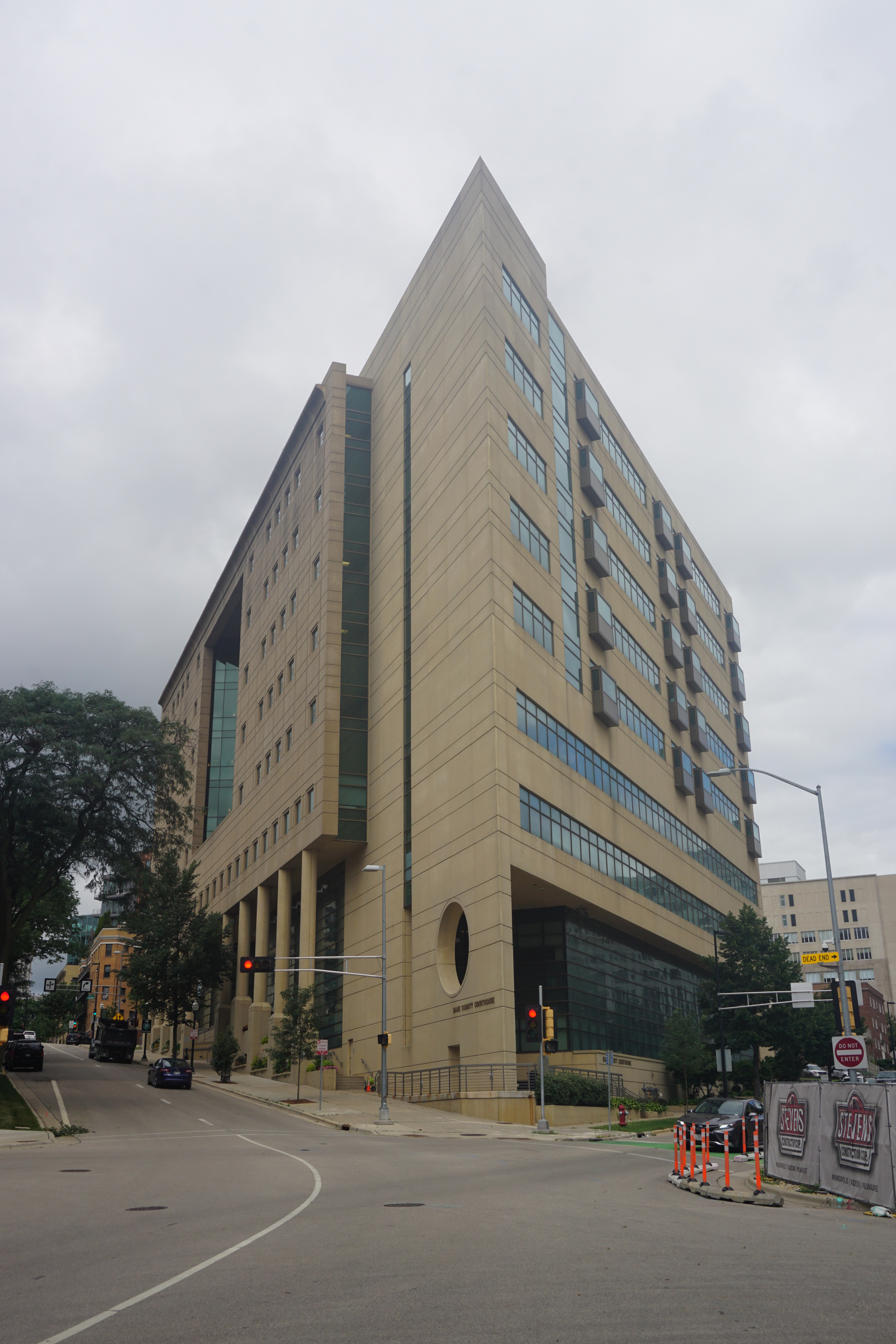
- The courthouse in August 2022
- Interactive map of the Dane County Courthouse area

General information
- Completed: 2005
- Cost: $44 million

Technical details
- Floor count: 8

The Dane County Courthouse is a courthouse located in the city of Madison in Dane County, Wisconsin. The eight-story low-rise early-modernism building, finished in 2005, required 16 years of planning and construction as well as $44 million to complete and was the first "green" building constructed by the County of Dane. In 2013 the probate division of the court became paperless, and in 2016 the remainder of the courthouse followed.
