= State Office Building (Madison, Wisconsin) =

- U.S. National Register of Historic Places
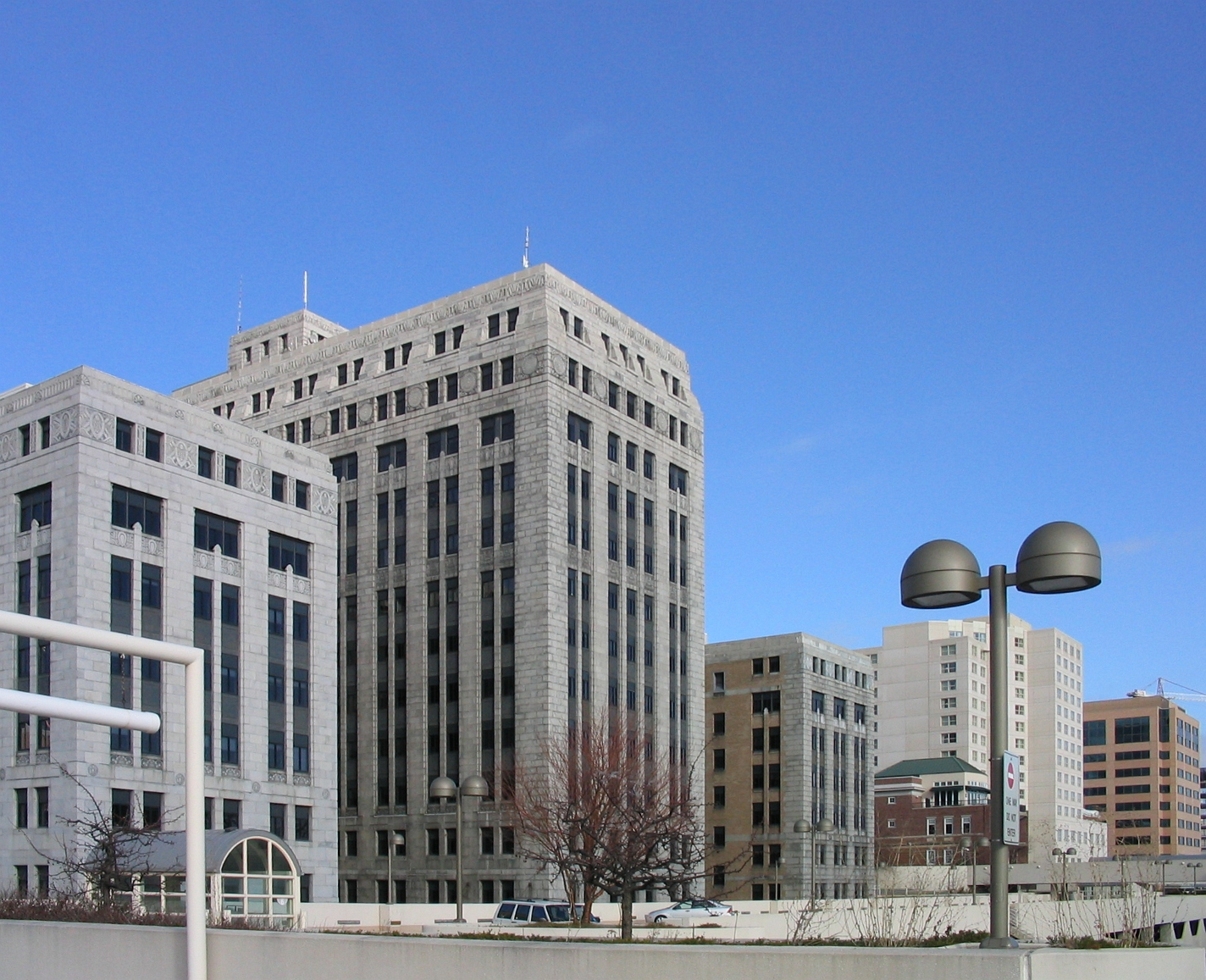
- State Office Building, south side

- Location within Wisconsin Location within the United States
- Location: 1 W. Wilson St., Madison, Wisconsin
- Coordinates: 43°4′19″N 89°22′54″W
- Area: 1.5 acres (0.61 ha)
- Built: 1931, 1939, 1956
- Architect: Peabody, Arthur
- Architectural style: Art Deco
- NRHP reference No.: 82000658
- Added to NRHP: January 28, 1982

The State Office Building is an 11-story, 177-foot-tall (54 m) high-rise located in downtown Madison, Wisconsin, United States. The complex was built in three separate stages between 1931 and 1959, with the main section being completed in 1939. It is built in an art deco style, and it is the tallest office building in downtown Madison.

The building was added to the National Register of Historic Places in 1982, considered the best representative of intact large-scale Art Deco architecture in Madison. It is also significant for its connection to the Public Works Administration.

== Design ==
As Wisconsin's state government outgrew existing facilities, the legislature recognized the need for more office space in Madison. In 1929 State Architect Arthur Peabody designed this building. His design has an E-shaped footprint, with the arms of the E reaching toward Lake Monona. The wing that is the center arm of the E is most prominent, standing eleven stories. Other parts of the E are six stories tall. The top stories taper in, and the public exterior is clad in gray granite.

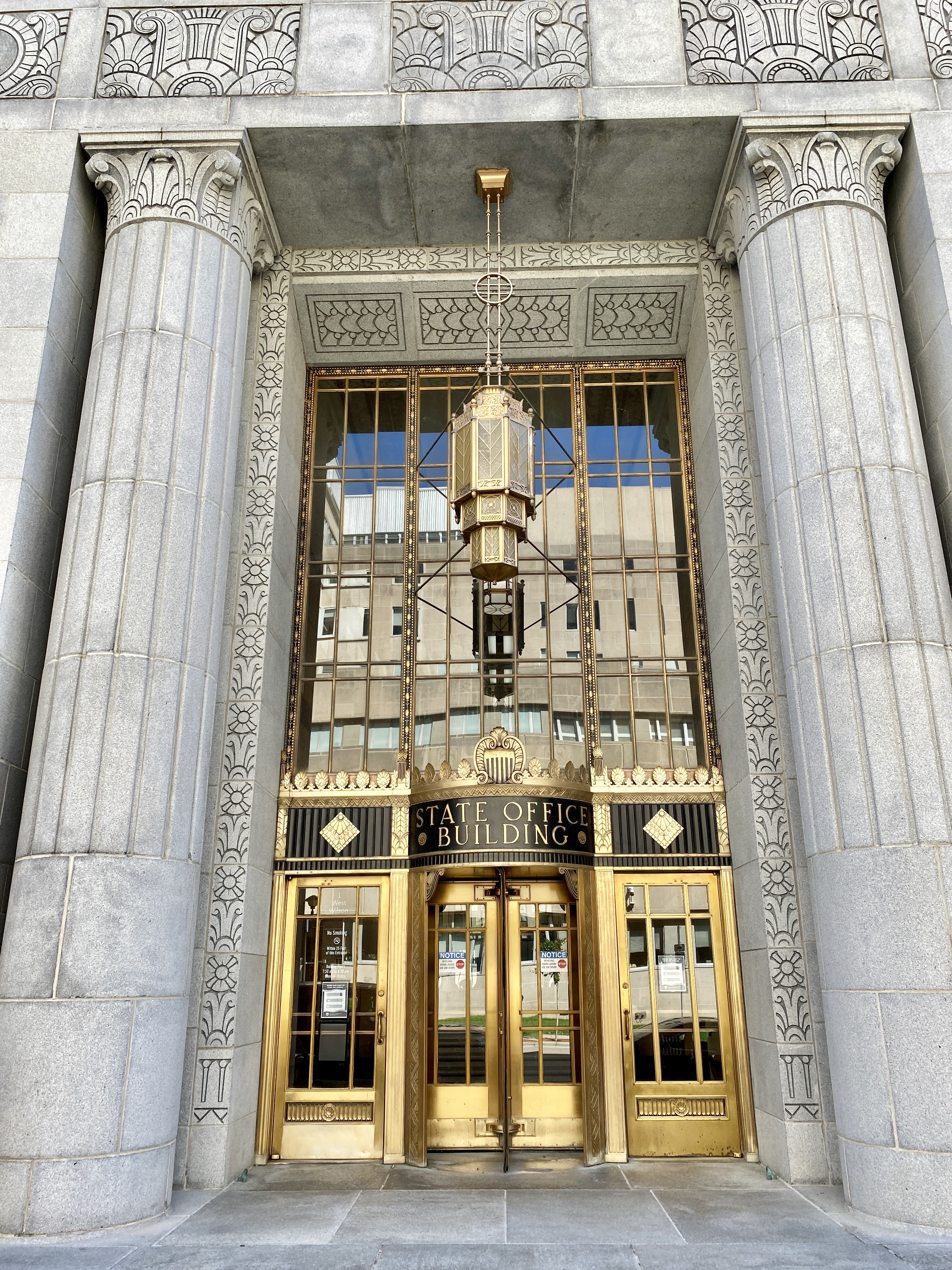
Main entrance on Wilson Street

Art Deco style is characterized by an emphasis on verticality and classical motifs, and this building has them. The two-story entrance on Wilson Street is flanked by colossal fluted columns and lit by bronze lamps. Windows decorated with stylized shields and acanthus leaves are grouped into columns separated by stone pilasters topped with stylized torches. Inside, the lobby has a terrazzo floor and the walls and ceiling are decorated with Appalachian Fossil Gray marble, Appalachian Dark, Kasota Yellow, and Westfield Green. The ceiling has a border of terracotta fans, shells and flowers. Other common spaces are decorated with different marbles.

== Construction of the building ==
The building was constructed in phases, with funding tight during the Great Depression. The north wing was built from 1930 to 1931, with J.H. Findorff & Sons as general contractor. The central wing was completed in 1939 with J.P. Cullen & Sons as general contractor. Total cost for the first two phases was $1,832,000, with $824,400 of that funded by a grant from the New Deal Public Works Administration. The south wing was finally completed in 1956, with Cullen again the general contractor and new State Architect Roger Kirschhoff supervising. The last wing cost about $3.5 million.

The masonry wall construction of the first and main units built lack a water drainage system, albeit typical for their 1930s vintage.

== Recent ==
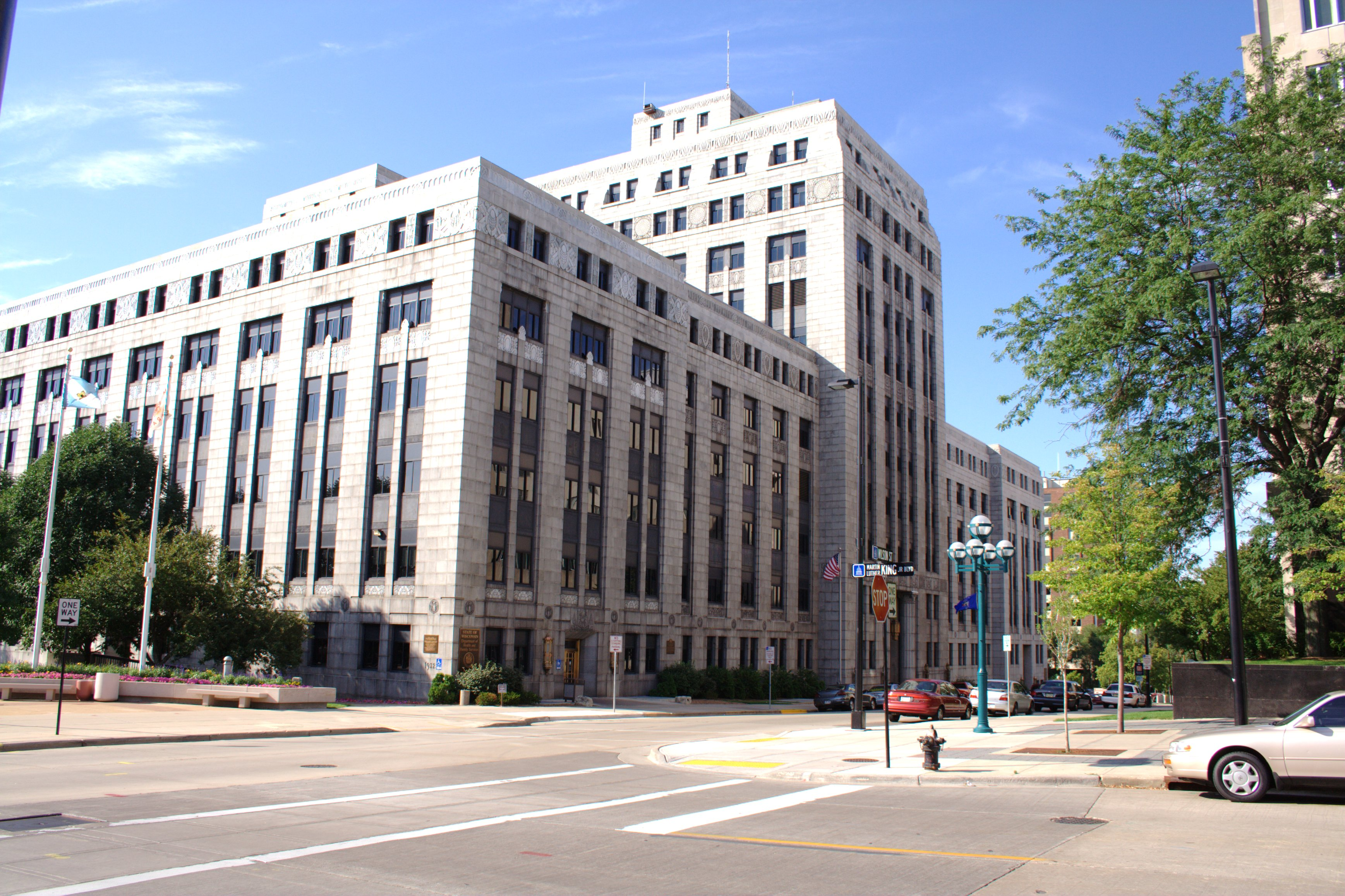
The State Office Building's north side, facing Wilson Street

As of 2025, the building is occupied by the Wisconsin Department of Health Services, but DHS plans to move to other quarters, and the state plans to sell the building.

== See also ==
- List of tallest buildings in Madison
