= State Street (Madison) =

Pedestrian mall and attraction in Madison, Wisconsin, US

Coordinates: 43°4′29.4″N 89°23′34″W

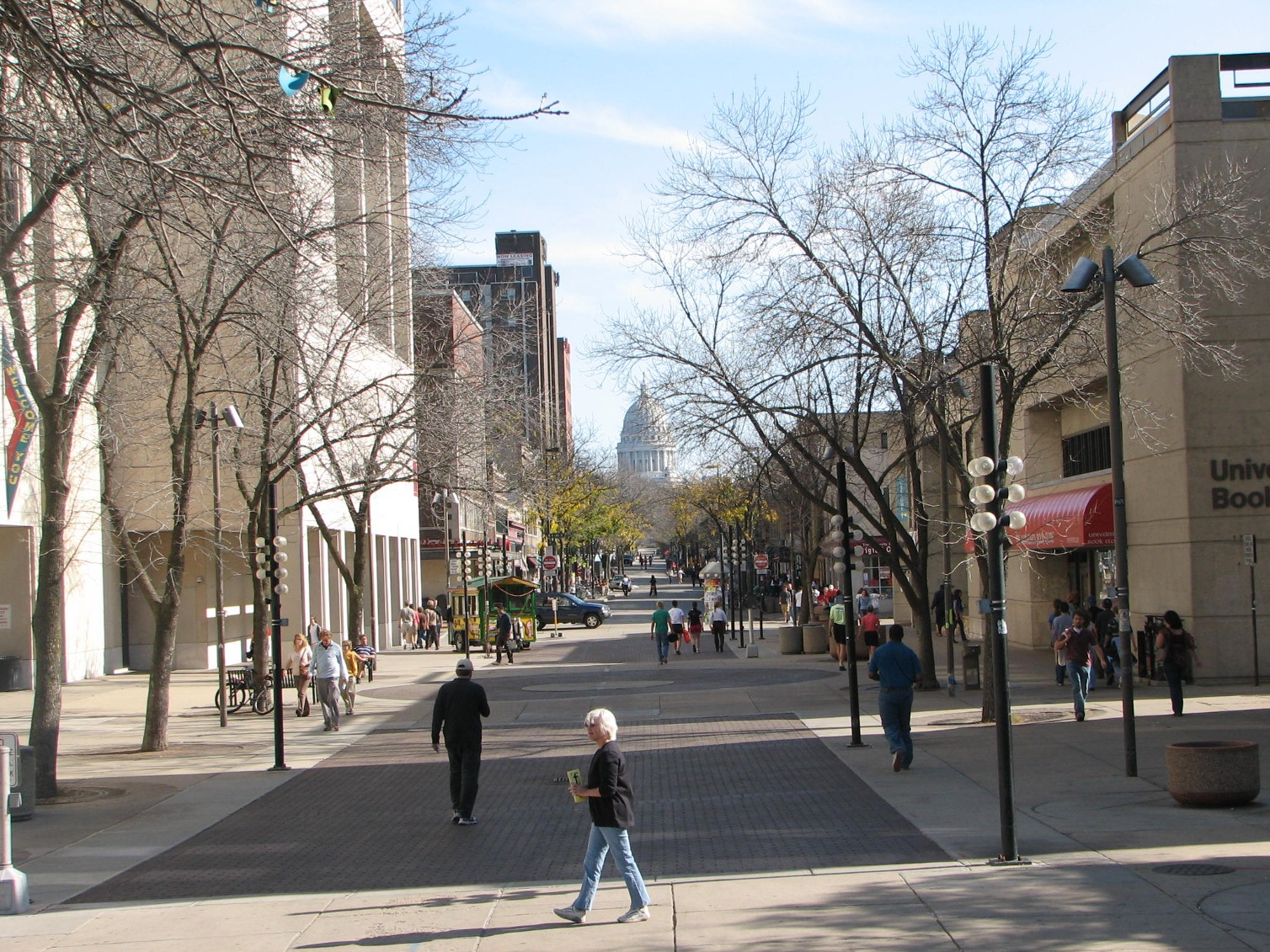
- State St. from Library mall, October 2007
- Interactive map of State Street
- Length: 0.78 mi (1.26 km)
- Location: Madison, Wisconsin, US

Construction
- Construction start: June 1974

State Street is a pedestrian zone located in downtown Madison, Wisconsin, United States, near the State Capitol. The road proper extends from the west corner of land comprising the Capitol (on the southwestern edge of the Madison Isthmus, at the corners of Carroll and Mifflin Streets) westward to Lake Street, adjoining the campus of the University of Wisconsin–Madison at Library Mall.

== History ==
The street was a conventional four-lane undivided road until 1974, when a proposal was passed by the City of Madison to turn it into a pedestrian mall. Construction on that project began in late June, 1974, with an initial estimated completion budget of $15 million. This conversion left the street as a two-lane limited-access road, with extra-wide sidewalks created on both sides of the now-narrower street. The east–west road allows only city buses, fire apparatus, police cars, bicycles, delivery vehicles, and pedestrian traffic.

Today, the street hosts a variety of shops, bars, and restaurants and is popular for its small-town appeal, street musicians, jugglers and other types of busking, making it a common tourist attraction. Places of interest on State Street are the Overture Center for the Arts, the Madison Museum of Contemporary Art, and the Memorial Library Mall.

During the summer of 2020, the economic impact of the COVID-19 pandemic caused 31 out of the 150 businesses located on State Street to close their doors. Additionally, widespread looting and vandalism occurred on State Street in May and June 2020 as a result of protests and riots related to the murder of George Floyd in Minneapolis. An estimated 75 businesses were vandalized and some were looted and robbed causing the Mayor to issue a state of emergency.

Just as business owners on State Street began removing boarded up windows and barricades, the shooting of Jacob Blake in Kenosha lead to further civil unrest in August and September 2020. Madison police used tear gas to disperse the rioters. A $300,000 fund was established to assist business owners affected by the rioting.

== Halloween ==
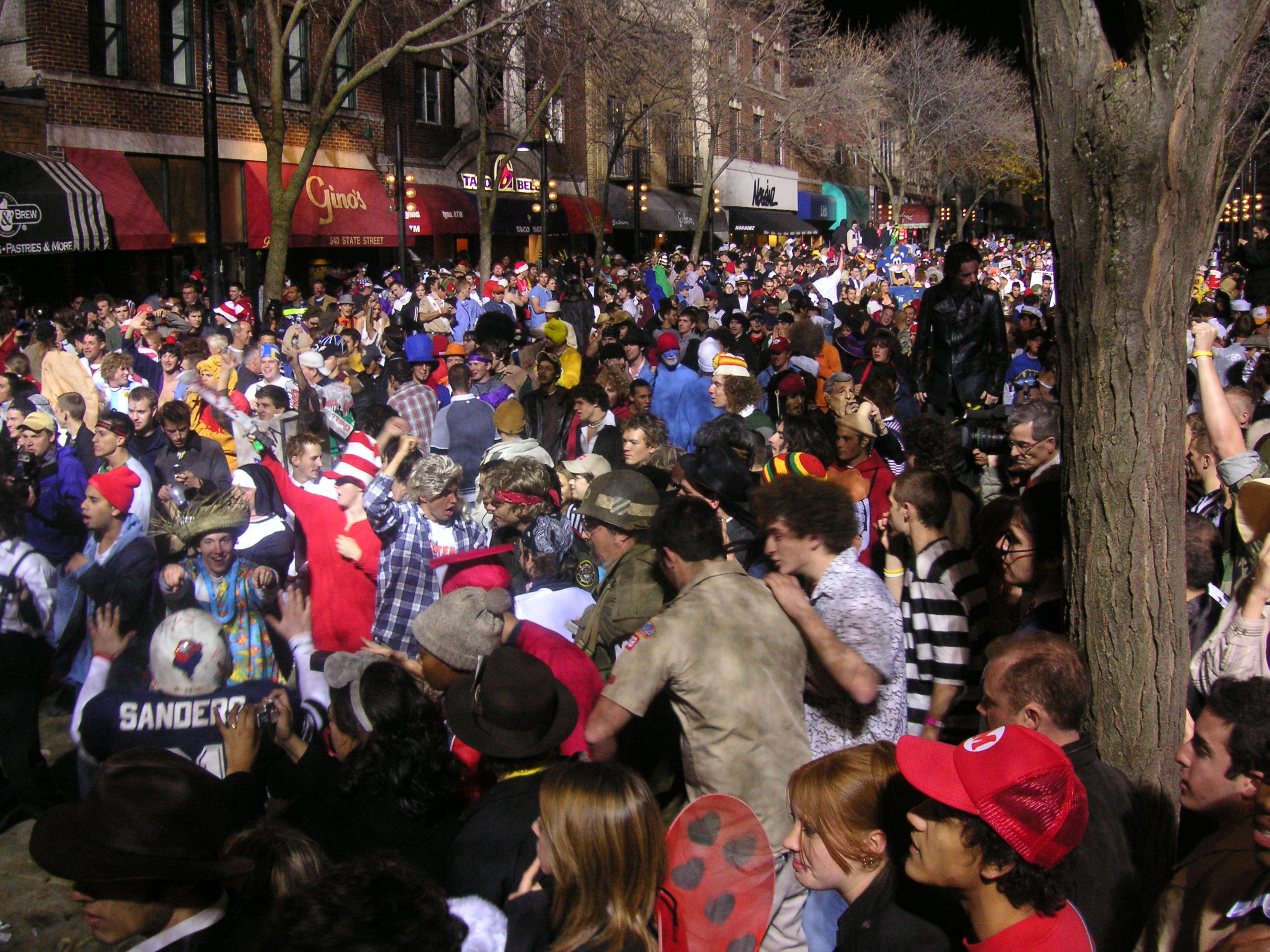
State Street on Halloween 2005

Since the late 1970s, State Street gained recognition as a gathering place for tens of thousands of party-goers from several states on Halloween. Once sponsored by the student government at UW-Madison, the party's popularity waned throughout the 1980s and 1990s until it saw a massive boom in the early 2000s. Since 2006, the State Street Halloween party, as a result of years of riotous behaviors, has become a city sanctioned event called "Freakfest" that is now headlined by nationally known musical acts.
