= Madison Waterworks =

- U.S. National Register of Historic Places
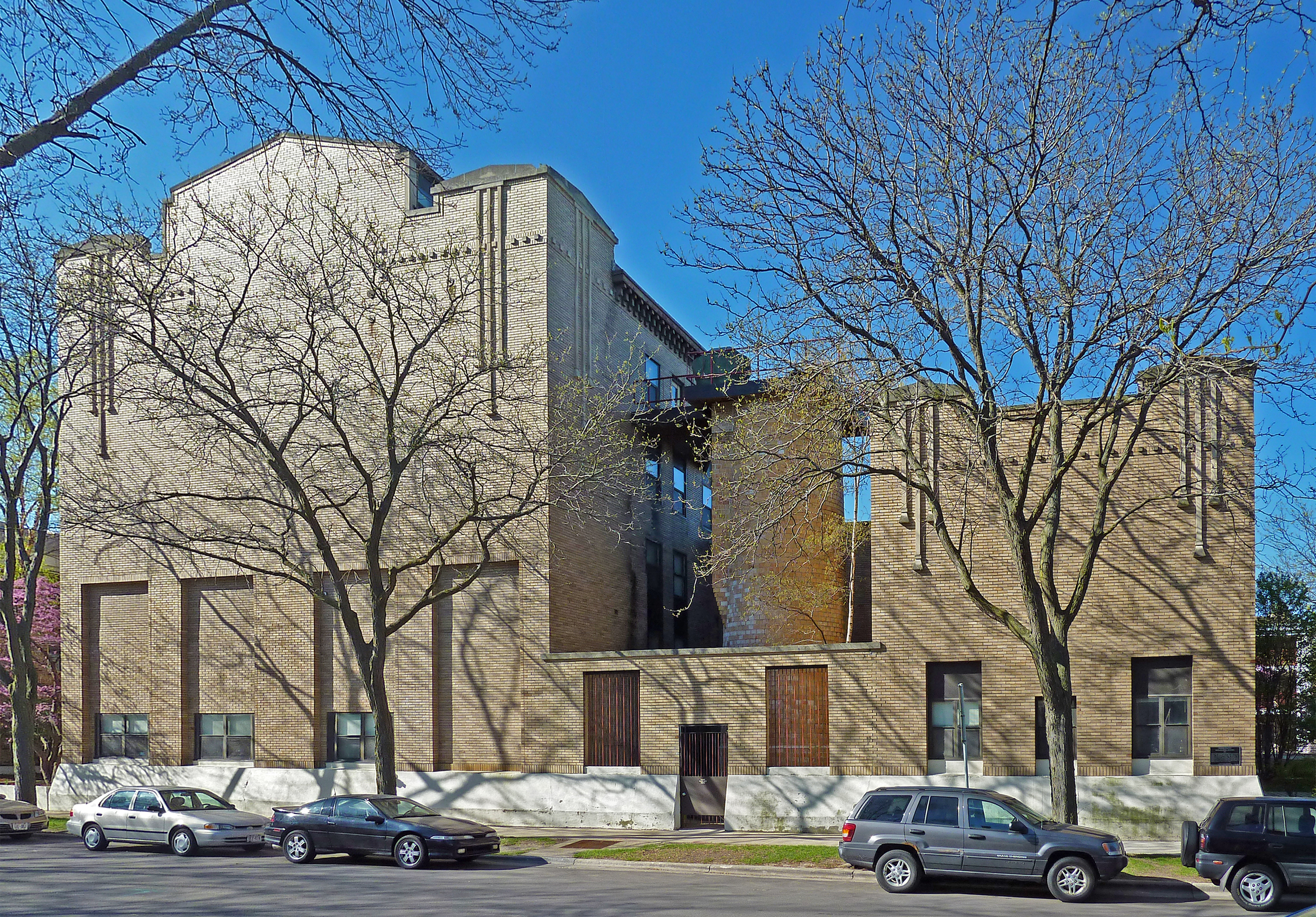

- Location within Wisconsin Location within the United States
- Location: E. Gorham St. between N. Franklin and N. Hancock St., Madison, Wisconsin
- Coordinates: 43°04′49″N 89°22′59″W
- Area: 0.4 acres (0.16 ha)
- Built: 1917
- Architect: Balch & Lippert
- Architectural style: Prairie School
- NRHP reference No.: 80000125
- Added to NRHP: August 18, 1980

Madison Waterworks, also known as Nichols Station, is a historic building on East Gorham Street between North Franklin and North Hancock in Madison, Wisconsin. The building was built in 1917 as part of an effort to overhaul Madison's municipal water system; in addition to its new pumping station, the city also began supplying its water system from Lake Mendota rather than artesian wells. To maintain the city's water supply during construction, the new pumping station was built around the original. Architects Balch & Lippert designed the building in a functional interpretation of the Prairie School style with mock turrets, a parapet along the roof, and several gables. The city reused elements of the design in many of the later buildings it built for the water system. The building originally included two Allis-Chalmers steam pumping engines, one of which still remained when the station was decommissioned in 1976; according to the Historic American Engineering Record, it is a rare surviving example of a large steam pumping engine.

The building was added to the National Register of Historic Places on August 18, 1980.
