= Strømsgodset Church =

Church in Buskerud, Norway

- Strømsgodset kirke
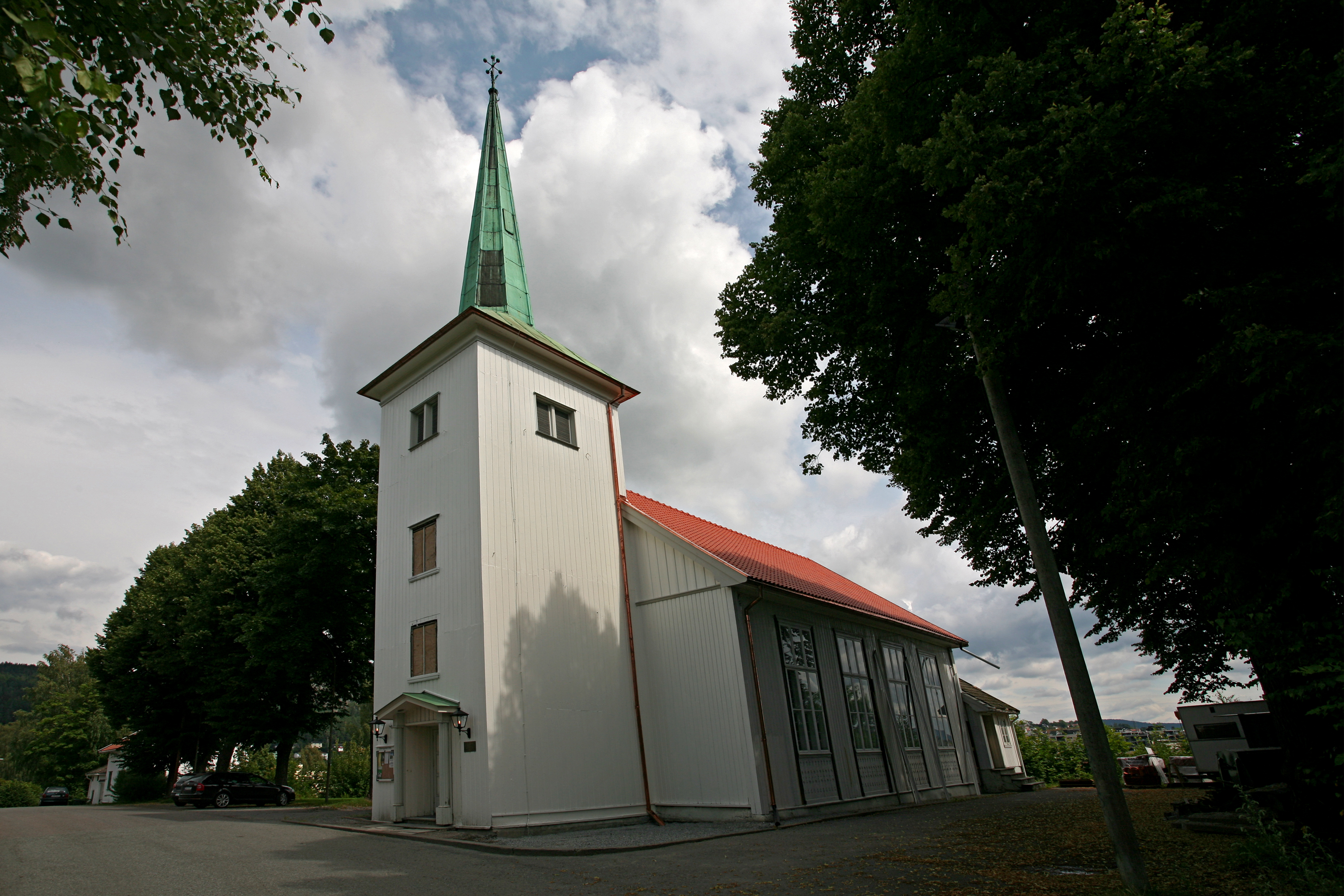
- View of the church
- Strømsgodset Church
- 59°44′33″N 10°11′13″E
- Location: Drammen Municipality, Buskerud
- Country: Norway
- Denomination: Church of Norway
- Churchmanship: Evangelical Lutheran

History
- Status: Parish church
- Founded: 1 Jan 1843
- Consecrated: 17 Dec 1843

Architecture
- Functional status: Active
- Architect: Christian Heinrich Grosch
- Architectural type: Rectangular
- Completed: 1843 (183 years ago)

Specifications
- Capacity: 250
- Materials: Wood

Administration
- Diocese: Tunsberg bispedømme
- Deanery: Drammen og Lier prosti
- Parish: Strømsgodset
- Norwegian Cultural Heritage Site
- Type: Church
- Status: Automatically protected
- ID: 84987

Strømsgodset Church (Norwegian: Strømsgodset kirke) is a parish church of the Church of Norway in Drammen Municipality in Buskerud county, Norway. It is located in the borough of Strømsgodset in the city of Drammen. It is the church for the Strømsgodset parish which is part of the Drammen og Lier prosti (deanery) in the Diocese of Tunsberg. The white, wooden church was built in a rectangular design in 1843 using plans drawn up by the architect Christian Heinrich Grosch. The church seats about 250 people.

== History ==
Plans for the new Strømsgodset Church were submitted in 1842. The church was designed by Christian H. Grosch, who at that time was working on the restoration and reconstruction of the nearby Bragernes Church and Strømsø Church. Construction began on New Year's Day in 1843, and the church was consecrated on 17 December 1843.

The church is a wooden long church with a tower on the west and. On the east end, there is a sacristy extension from the 1880s. The church has paneling both outside and inside. It was renovated for the centenary in 1943 under the leadership of Wilhelm Karlsson and Carsten Lien. The church was repainted in 1968 in consultation with Odd Helland at the Norwegian Directorate for Cultural Heritage.

== See also ==
- List of churches in Tunsberg
