= Tranby Church =

Church in Buskerud, Norway

- Tranby kirke
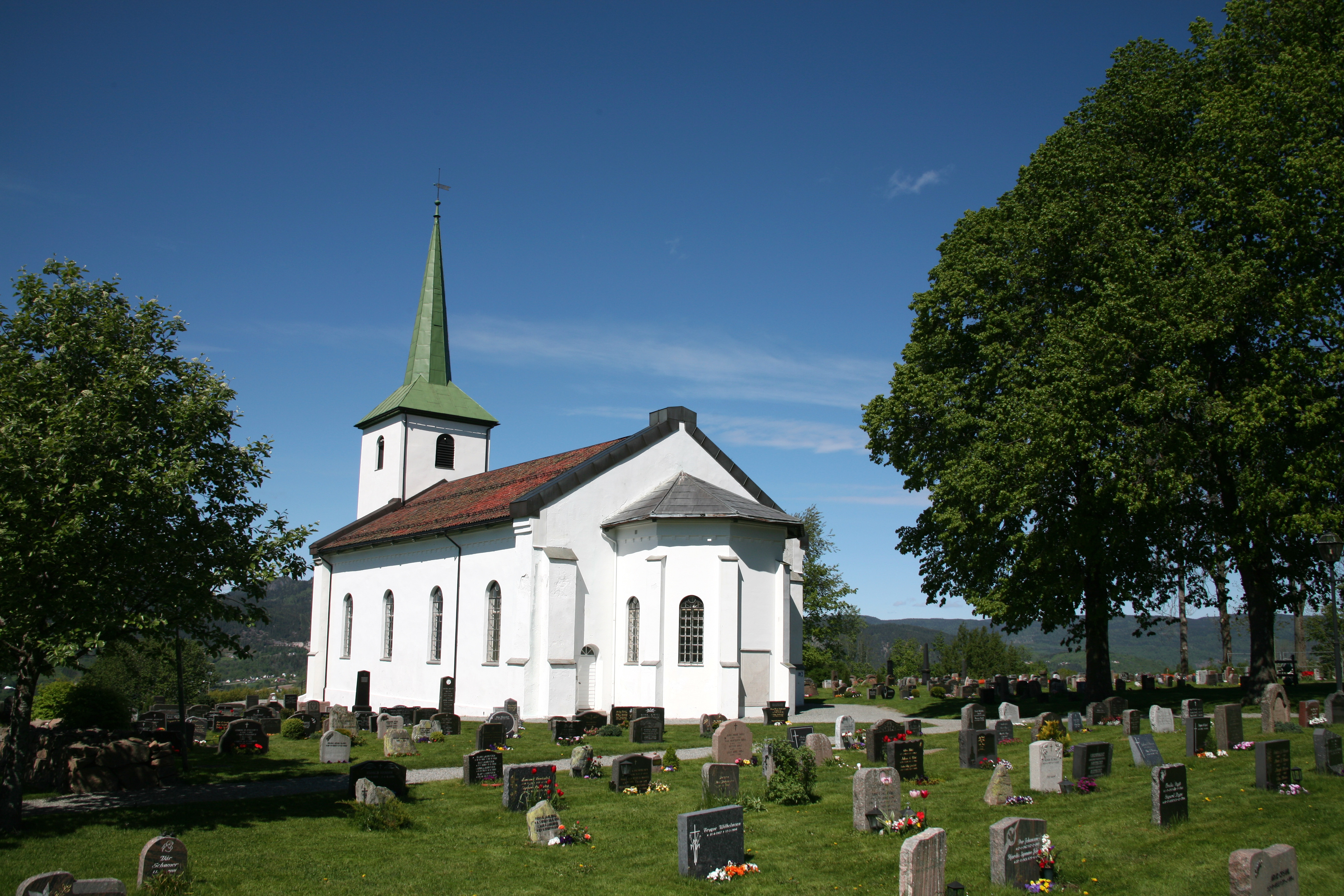
- View of the church
- Tranby Church
- 59°48′38″N 10°15′26″E
- Location: Lier Municipality, Buskerud
- Country: Norway
- Denomination: Church of Norway
- Previous denomination: Catholic Church
- Churchmanship: Evangelical Lutheran

History
- Status: Parish church
- Founded: c. 12th century
- Consecrated: 19 Dec 1855

Architecture
- Functional status: Active
- Architect(s): Heinrich Ernst Schirmer and Wilhelm von Hanno
- Architectural type: Long church
- Completed: 1855 (171 years ago)

Specifications
- Capacity: 225
- Materials: Stone

Administration
- Diocese: Tunsberg
- Deanery: Drammen og Lier
- Parish: Tranby og Lierskogen
- Norwegian Cultural Heritage Site
- Type: Church
- Status: Not protected
- ID: 85662

Tranby Church (Norwegian: Tranby kirke) is a parish church of the Church of Norway in Lier Municipality in Buskerud county, Norway. It is located in the village of Tranby. It is one of the churches for the Tranby og Lierskogen parish which is part of the Drammen og Lier prosti (deanery) in the Diocese of Tunsberg. The white, stone church was built in a long church design in 1855 using plans drawn up by the architects Heinrich Ernst Schirmer and Wilhelm von Hanno. The church seats about 225 people.

== History ==
The earliest existing historical records of the church date back to the year 1400, but the church was not built that year. The medieval church was a small stone long church with a rectangular nave and a smaller rectangular choir. The building was dedicated to the Archangel Michael. After the Reformation, Tranby became an annex chapel to Frogner Church, which is about 4 kilometres (2.5 mi) away on the other side of the valley, however it served as the main church for the parish after the 1651 fire that burned the Frogner Church until it was repaired. The church, like most other churches in Norway, was sold into private ownership during the Norwegian church sale in 1723 to help the King pay off war debts. In 1752, the church was sold to the local residents of the area. Lier Municipality took over the ownership of the church in 1842. Although some repairs were made, the church building was in poor condition. It was decided to demolish the church and build a new one in its place. The demolition took place in 1854.

The new church in Tranby was designed by the famous architects Heinrich Ernst Schirmer and Wilhelm von Hanno. It was built about 10 metres (33 ft) north and 8 metres (26 ft) west of the previous church. The new church was consecrated on 19 December 1855. It is a long church constructed out of natural stone and brick with plaster both outside and inside. The nave is rectangular, the choir is polygonally finished, and the church has a west tower. In the eastern part of the nave there is a separate sacristy to the north and a baptismal waiting room to the south. The year of consecration 1855 can be seen above the west entrance, while the spire's wind vane came into place a couple of years later and bears the year 1857.

== See also ==
- List of churches in Tunsberg
