= Bragernes Church =

Church in Buskerud, Norway

- Bragernes kirke
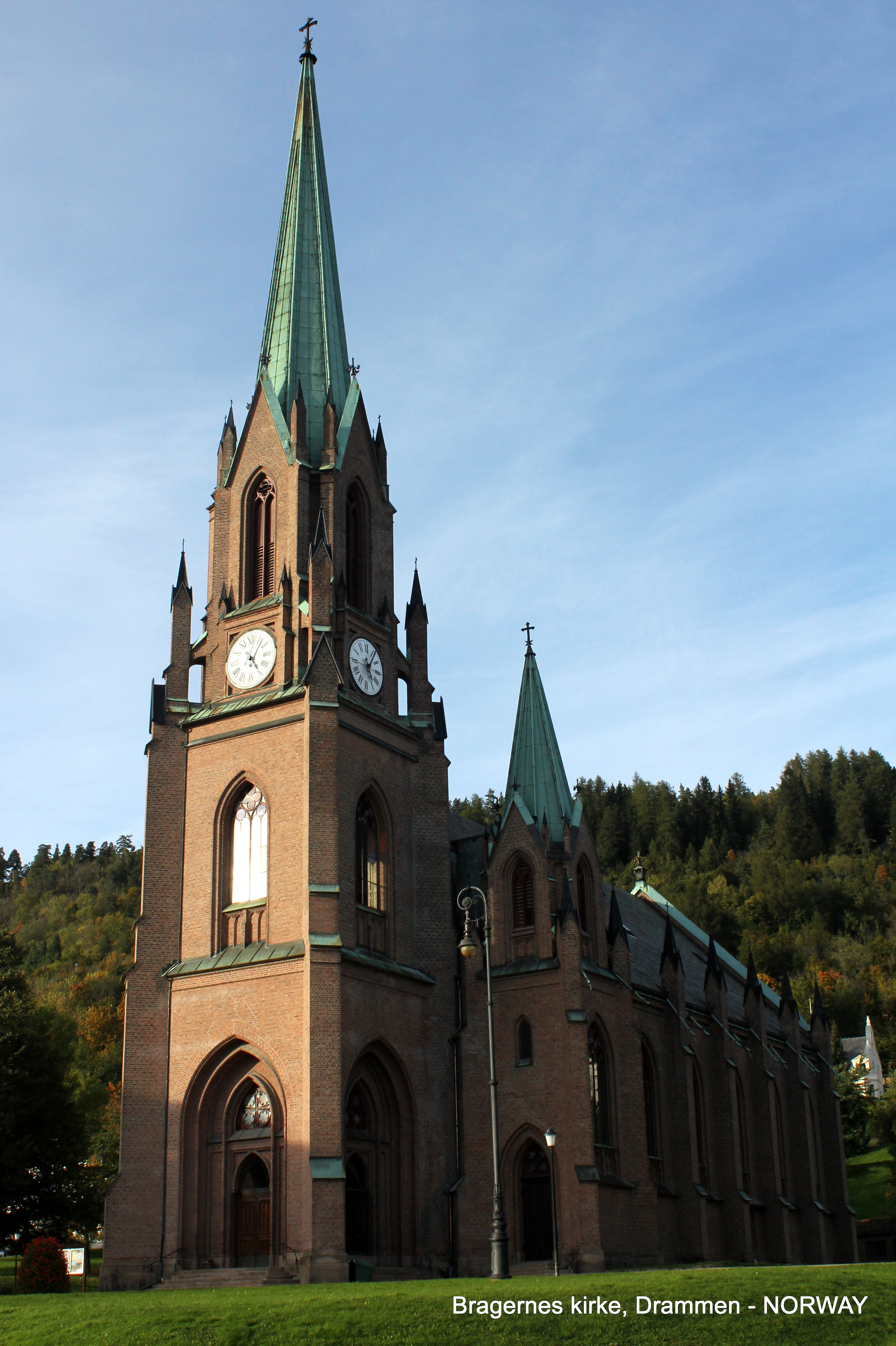
- View of the church
- Bragernes Church
- 59°44′48″N 10°12′24″E
- Location: Drammen Municipality, Buskerud
- Country: Norway
- Denomination: Church of Norway
- Churchmanship: Evangelical Lutheran
- Website: Official website

History
- Status: Parish church
- Founded: 1628
- Consecrated: 12 July 1871

Architecture
- Functional status: Active
- Architect: Ernst Robarth Dalin Norgrenn
- Architectural type: Long church
- Style: Neo Gothic
- Completed: 1871 (155 years ago)

Specifications
- Capacity: 600
- Materials: Brick

Administration
- Diocese: Tunsberg
- Deanery: Drammen og Lier
- Parish: Bragernes
- Norwegian Cultural Heritage Site
- Type: Church
- Status: Listed
- ID: 83937

Bragernes Church (Norwegian: Bragernes kirke) is a parish church of the Church of Norway in Drammen Municipality in Buskerud county, Norway. It is located in Bragernes in the city of Drammen. It is the church for the Bragernes parish which is part of the Drammen og Lier prosti (deanery) in the Diocese of Tunsberg. The red brick church was built in a long church design in 1871 using plans drawn up by the architect Ernst Norgrenn. The church seats about 600 people.

== History ==
There had been a settlement at Bragernes (on the north side of the Drammenselva river) for a long time, but the population increased in the 16th and 17th centuries as a shipping port developed. In 1628, the first church was built in Bragernes. It was consecrated on 29 September 1628 and it was an annex chapel to Frogner Church in the nearby Lier prestegjeld. The church was originally called Holy Trinity Church (Norwegian: Hellig Trefoldighets kirke). In 1723, the church became a parish church when the new Bragernes prestegjeld was established. The first church building was located closer to the north bank of the Drammenelva river, about 300 metres (980 ft) southwest of the current buildign. This was a wooden cruciform building that received a new stone tower on the west end of the building in 1699. The church (except for the new tower) was demolished as early as 1708, and a new wooden church building was constructed next to the relatively new stone tower. The original intention was to build a stone church, but the ground on the church site was apparently not suitable for that, so a wooden building was constructed.

The second church at Bragernes was a log building that was consecrated on 19 December 1708. This was also a cruciform church, and its western transept was built up to the eastern edge of the tower. There was a choir in the eastern transept and a sacristy in an extension off of it. The church had entrances through the tower in the west and in the northern and southern transepts. The timber walls were panelled on the inside in 1717, and the outer walls also had panels.

In 1814, this church served as an election church (Norwegian: valgkirke). Together with more than 300 other parish churches across Norway, it was a polling station for elections to the 1814 Norwegian Constituent Assembly which wrote the Constitution of Norway. This was Norway's first national election. Each church parish was a constituency that elected people called "electors" who later met together in each county to elect the representatives for the assembly that was to meet at Eidsvoll Manor later that year.

The church was originally in Baroque style, but gained a neoclassical feel after a reconstruction by Christian H. Grosch in 1839–1843. This was at the same time as the reconstruction of the nearby Strømsø Church. This church was destroyed in the city fire of 1866. The altarpiece must have been saved, because it later found its way to Frogner Church.

After the fire, the church site was moved about 300 metres (980 ft) further to the east. The new site was chosen to sit at the end of the road (Kirkegata) heading north from the bridge that crosses the Drammenselva river. The new town hall and fire station were built along this new road also. An architectural competition was announced to design the new church and Ernst Robarth Dalin Norgrenn was chosen. H. Guttormsen and G. Keppler responsible for the masonry and woodwork, respectively. The church was consecrated on 12 July 1871. The new church was a relatively large three-nave brick church in a neo-Gothic style. On both sides of the choir there are auxiliary rooms, of which the west side contains the priest's sacristy. Next to this is a rectangular chapel, and a new sacristy was built between this and the church in 1971. There is a 64-metre (210 ft) tall tower at the entrance. The cemetery is located a couple blocks to the west of the church at the site of the old church.

The pulpit was designed by Ernst Norgrenn, while the baptismal font was by Christian Borch. The altarpiece, Resurrection was painted by Adolph Tidemand. It was copied in many Norwegian churches. The church organ has 38 voices and was built in the romantic style of organ builder Carsten Lund Organ Builders of Copenhagen (Carsten Lund Orgelbyggeri).

== Media gallery ==

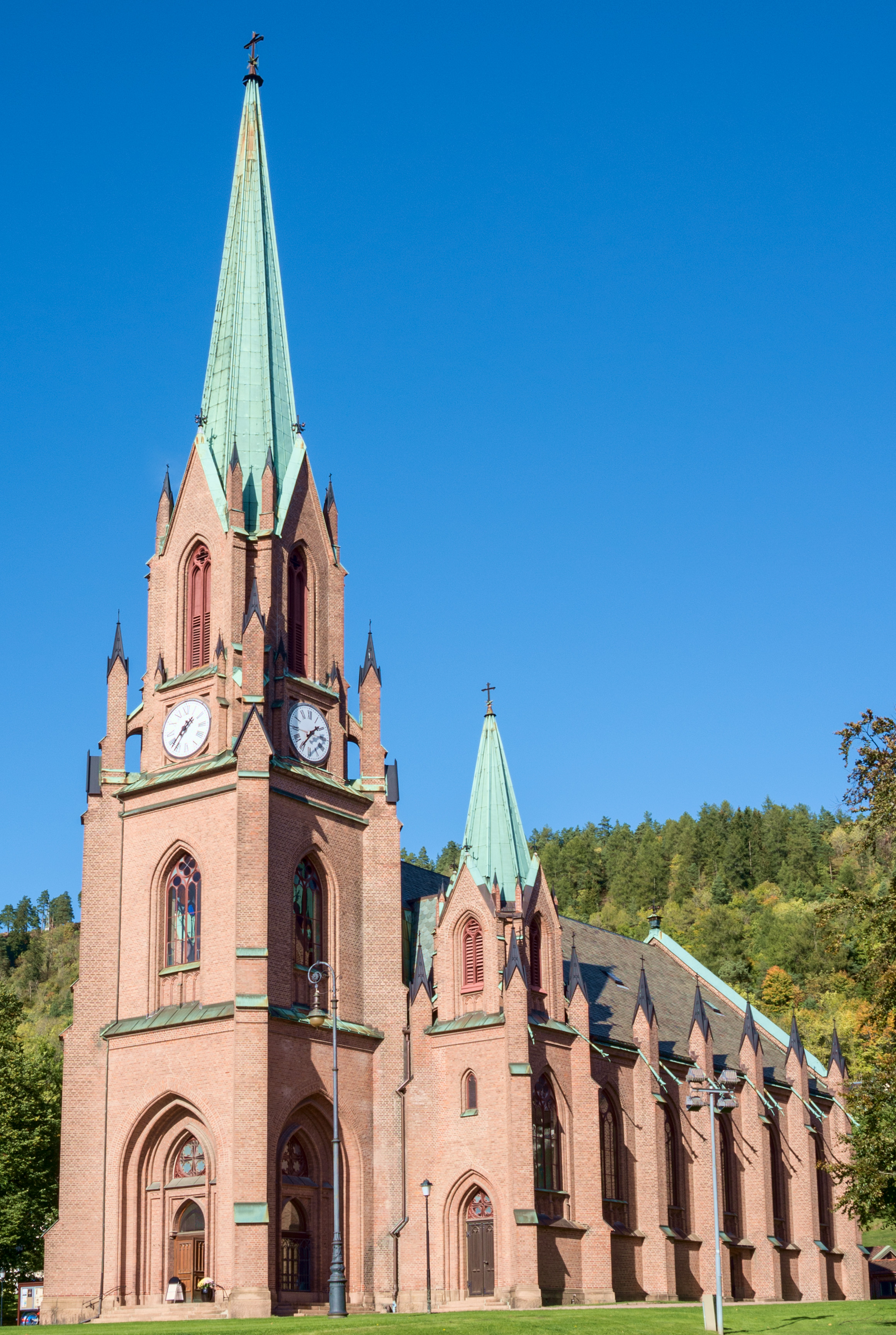

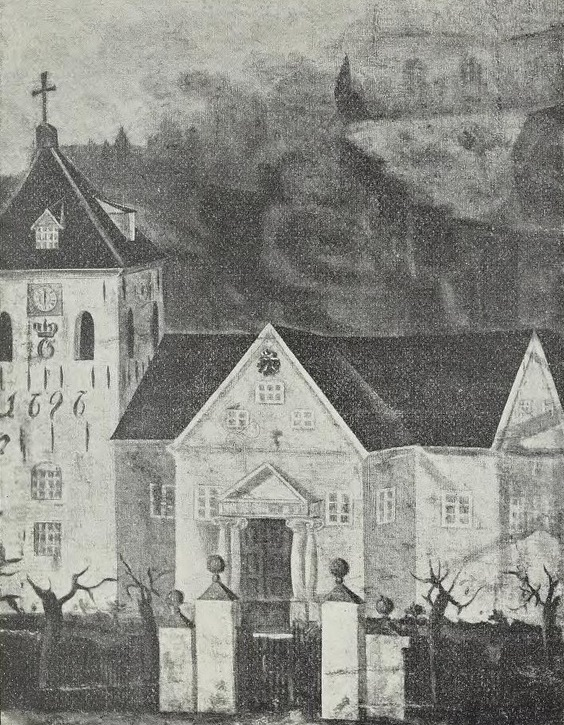
Old church c. 1800

Church ruins after the fire in 1866

== See also ==
- List of churches in Tunsberg
