= Strømsgodset =

Former municipality in Vestfold county in Norway

Coordinates: 59°44′21″N 10°10′19″E

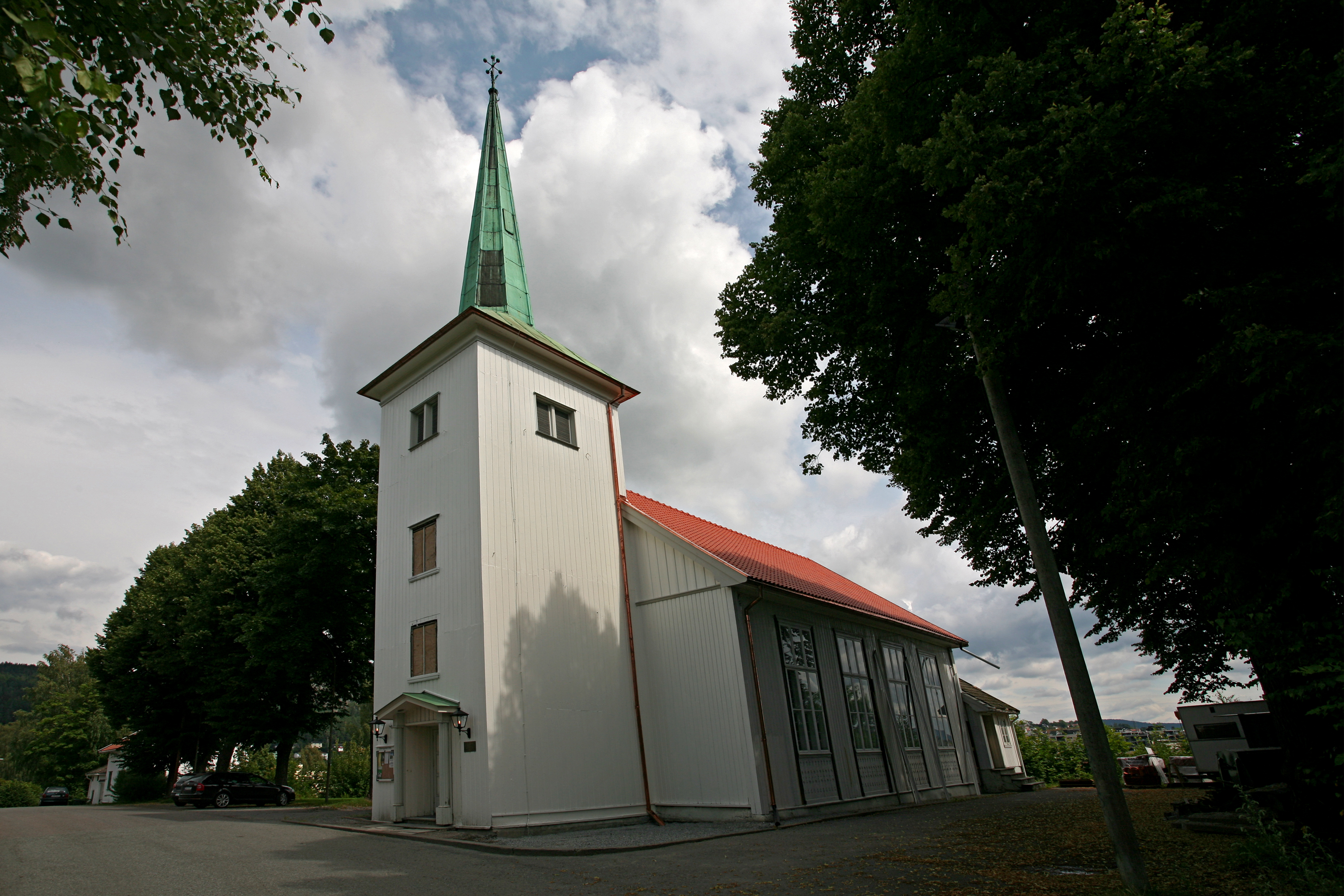
Strømsgodset Church

Strømsgodset is a former municipality in Vestfold county (from 1964 Buskerud county) in Norway which is today a part of the city of Drammen.

== History ==
Strømsgodset was originally a small rural annex to the city parish of Bragernes (Drammen). But since this annex belonged to the county of Vestfold, while the city belonged to the county of Buskerud, it had to be established as a formannskapsdistrikt of its own on 1 January 1838. (The law of formannskapsdistrikt also required a division between cities and rural districts.) The small size of this formannskapsdistrikt was, however, a problem - and it had to be merged with the larger municipality of Skoger on 1 January 1844. Before the merger Strømsgodset had a population of 731. Skoger (with Strømsgodset) was merged with Drammen on 1 January 1964 - and it was then transferred from the county of Vestfold to the county of Buskerud. Today, Strømsgodset forms the eastern part of the borough of Gulskogen in Drammen. It is known mainly for its football team, Strømsgodset IF.

== Strømsgodset Church ==
The Strømsgodset Church (Norwegian: Strømsgodset kirke) is a wooden church constructed in a rectangular shape, dating from 1843. It was designed by the architect Christian H. Grosch. The church has a rectangular chapel, nave and chancel have equal width and height. On its 100th anniversary in 1943 the church underwent a renovation led by architect Wilhelm Karlsson and headteacher Carsten Lien. Norwegian poet, novelist and newspaper editor Per Sivle was buried in the church cemetery.

== The name ==
The meaning of the name is 'the estate (gods) of the noble farm of Strøm'. The old farm Strøm (Norse Straumr) is located at the bank of Drammenselva, and it is named after the stream (straumr) in the river there. (The name is not related to Strømm in the same county, which is named after another farm with the same meaning.)
