= Strømsø Church =

Church in Buskerud, Norway

- Strømsø kirke
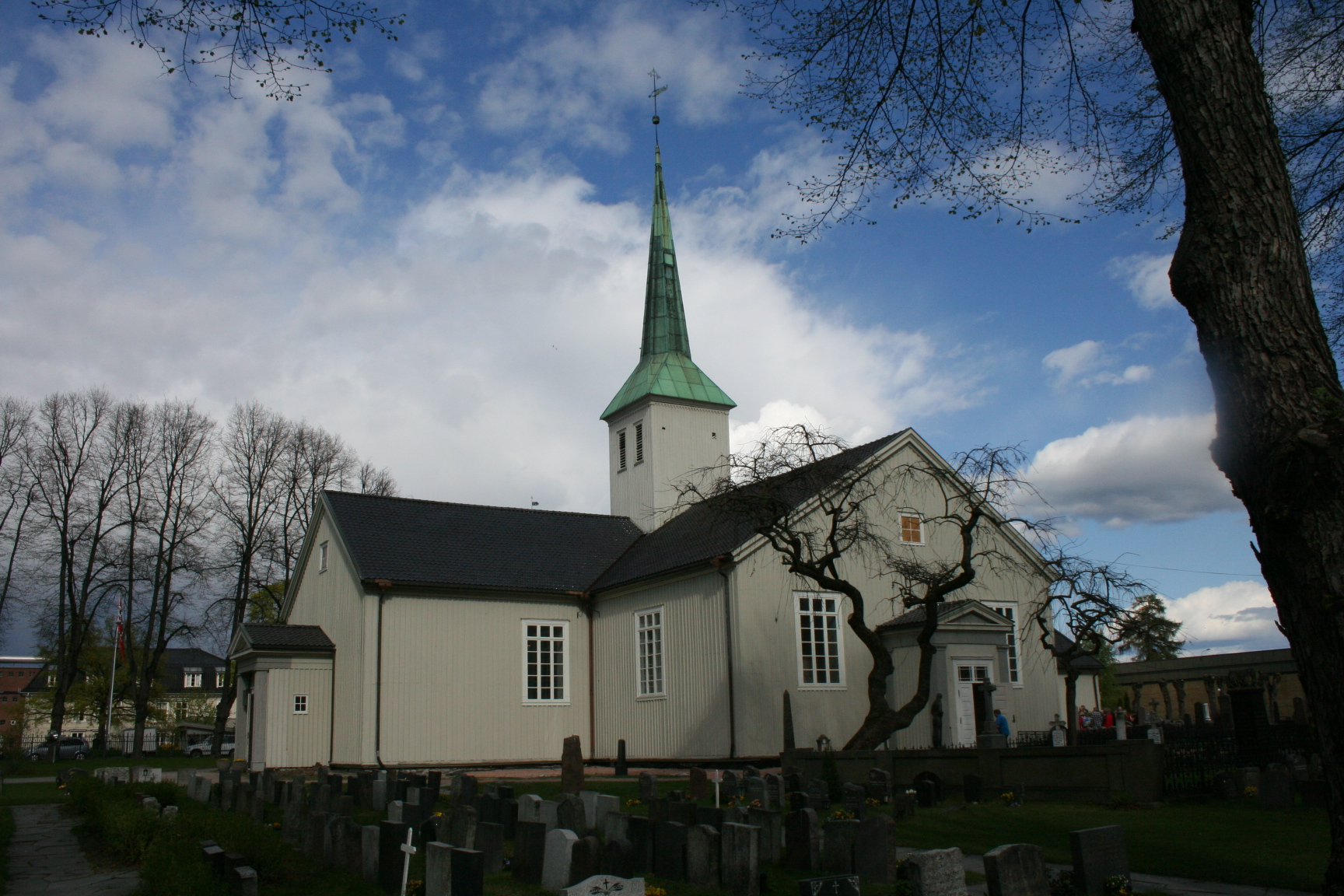
- View of the church
- Strømsø Church
- 59°44′10″N 10°12′30″E
- Location: Drammen Municipality, Buskerud
- Country: Norway
- Denomination: Church of Norway
- Churchmanship: Evangelical Lutheran

History
- Status: Parish church
- Founded: 1667
- Consecrated: 6 May 1667

Architecture
- Functional status: Active
- Architect(s): Erik Pedersen and Torger Hansen
- Architectural type: Cruciform
- Completed: 1667 (359 years ago)

Specifications
- Capacity: 540
- Materials: Wood

Administration
- Diocese: Tunsberg bispedømme
- Deanery: Drammen og Lier prosti
- Parish: Tangen og Strømsø
- Norwegian Cultural Heritage Site
- Type: Church
- Status: Automatically protected
- ID: 84989

Strømsø Church (Norwegian: Strømsø kirke) is a parish church of the Church of Norway in Drammen Municipality in Buskerud county, Norway. It is located in the borough of Strømsø in the city of Drammen. It is one of the churches for the Tangen og Strømsø parish which is part of the Drammen og Lier prosti (deanery) in the Diocese of Tunsberg. The white, wooden church was built in a cruciform design in 1667 using plans drawn up by the architects Erik Pedersen and Torger Hansen. The church seats about 540 people.

== History ==
What is now the city of Drammen was once two towns on either side of the Drammenselva river. The Bragernes side got the new Bragernes Church in 1628. Problems with crossing the river meant that residents on the other side of the river applied for permission in 1664 to build a separate church on the other side of the river in Strømsø. Work began the following year to construct the new Strømsø Church, led by the master builders Erik Pedersen and Torger Hansen and the master carpenter Anders Paaske. The church was consecrated by the priest Hans Rosing on 6 May 1667. The church was originally paid for by the merchants of Strømsø, who also took care of its operation (which was also financed by paying for chairs and graves). The municipality took over the care of the church in 1856. Strømsø was originally an annex to Bragernes Church, but became a separate parish in 1843.

The church was originally built using log construction. The building is cruciform and the eastern transept is 13 metres (43 ft) wide and it houses the chancel with a sacristy at the eastern end of it. The other three transepts are 16 metres (52 ft) wide and have seating and a second floor seating gallery. There is a central tower rising above the center of the building. In 1702 the log walls were covered over with wood panels. In 1839–1843 the interior was considerably changed according to plans by Christian H. Grosch.

== See also ==
- List of churches in Tunsberg
