= Log house moulder =

Machine to prepare logs for construction use

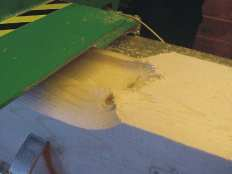
Detail how the cutter moulds the beam

A log house moulder is a machine used to shape logs for building a log home. Shaping creates the correct profile for stacking and joining logs. This process may involve removing the bark, milling into a cylinder, and/or planing into flat surfaces. Log house moulders may be machines capable of processing large volumes of unlimited length logs, or more portable units which leverage a chainsaw as a motor.

== Capabilities ==
Industrial log through-pass moulders centralize several steps of wood preparation, weighting up to 11,000 kilograms and able to process up to 1,000 meters of logs per 8 hours. Barked or debarked green or dry logs are fed into such a machine one after another. Logs are milled into shape which, depending on style, results in cylindrical or square beams. These different profiles are customizable depending on construction method: Swedish cope, Tongue&groove, D-log, bevel-edged, etc. This configuration is accomplished through affixing different saw teeth to produce flat, curved, or notched cuts. While permanent log house moulders are powered by electricity, portable sawmills use a chainsaw driven milling cutter.

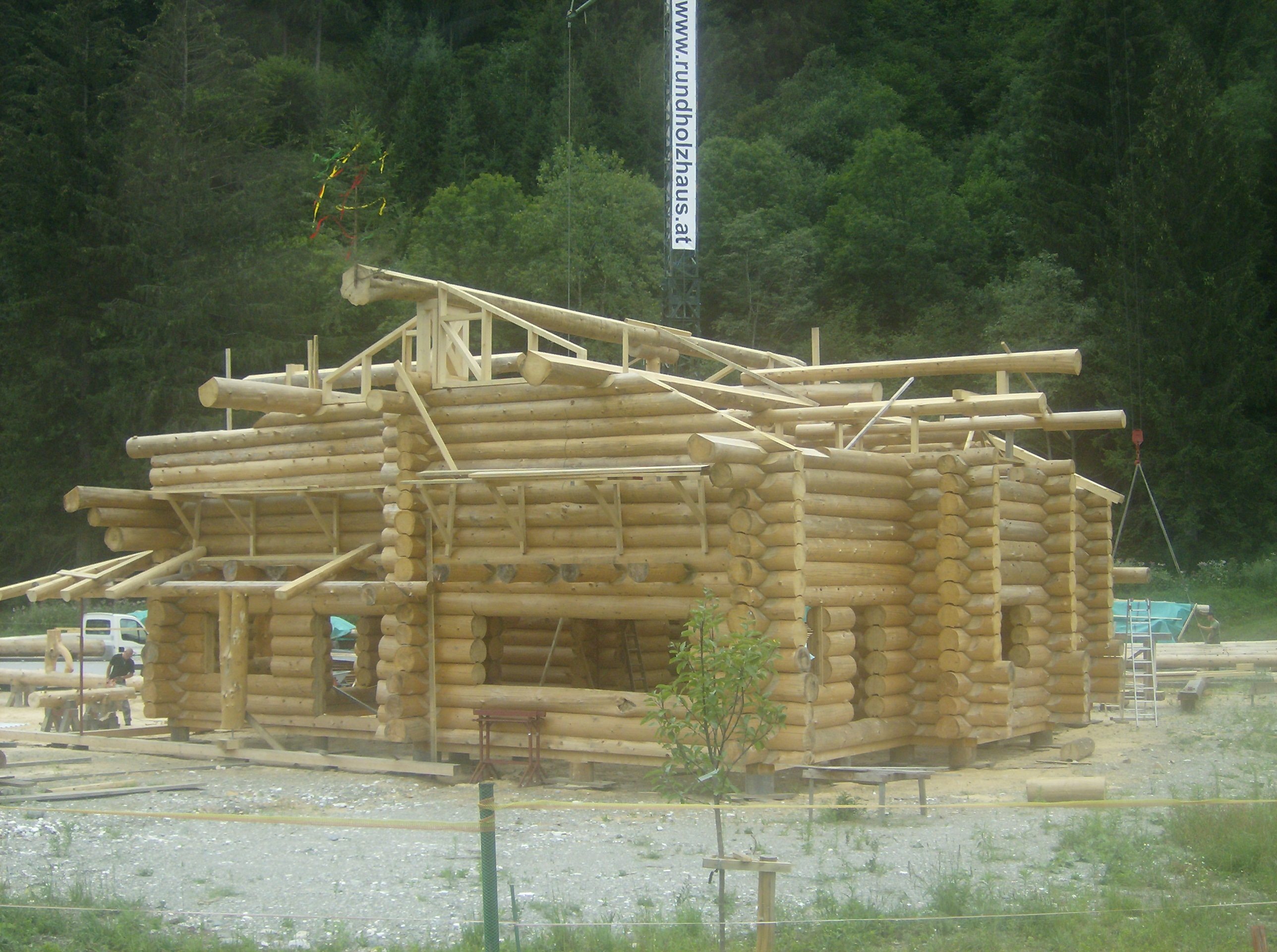
A log home under construction
