= Frogner Church (Buskerud) =

Church in Buskerud, Norway

- Frogner kirke
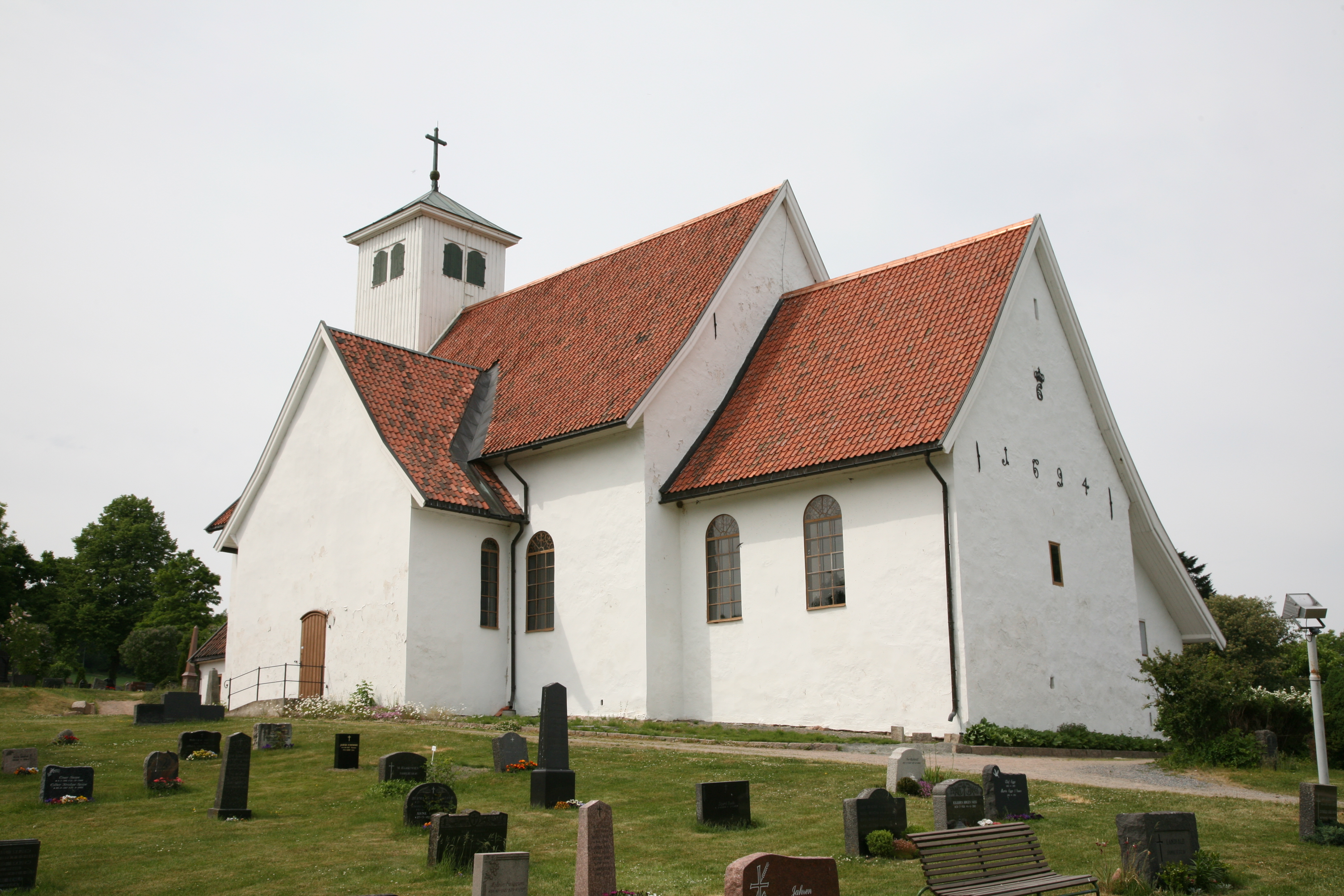
- View of the church
- Frogner Church
- 59°46′44″N 10°13′25″E
- Location: Lier Municipality, Buskerud
- Country: Norway
- Denomination: Church of Norway
- Previous denomination: Catholic Church
- Churchmanship: Evangelical Lutheran

History
- Status: Parish church
- Founded: 12th century
- Consecrated: 26 Oct 1694

Architecture
- Functional status: Active
- Architectural type: Cruciform
- Completed: 1694 (332 years ago)

Specifications
- Capacity: 350
- Materials: Stone

Administration
- Diocese: Tunsberg
- Deanery: Drammen og Lier
- Parish: Frogner
- Norwegian Cultural Heritage Site
- Type: Church
- Status: Automatically protected
- ID: 84301

Frogner Church (Norwegian: Frogner kirke) is a parish church of the Church of Norway in Lier Municipality in Buskerud county, Norway. It is located southwest of the village of Lierbyen. It is one of the churches for the Frogner parish which is part of the Drammen og Lier prosti (deanery) in the Diocese of Tunsberg. The white, stone church was built in a cruciform design in 1694 using plans drawn up by an unknown architect. The church seats about 350 people.

== History ==
The earliest existing historical records of the church date back to the year 1327, but the church was not built that year. The first church in Lier was likely a stone church built during the 12th century. On 9 June 1651, lightning struck the church and it burned down. After the fire, the ruins were inspected and determined that the extensive damage meant the church had to be rebuilt. For some reason, however, it was not rebuilt. There is evidence that a temporary building was constructed in 1658, but it was quite a while before a proper building was erected. In 1692, the local people turned to the king with a plea for help and he agreed to build a new church. Drawings were prepared, and masonry work began in the summer of 1693, as the new church was built on the foundations of the old one. The new church was consecrated on 26 October 1694, over 40 years since the previous church was destroyed.

The new building was a stone cruciform design with 350 seats. The nave is rectangular and relatively long, while the choir is narrower and almost square. In the middle of the nave there are relatively short transepts, and the church has a sacristy on the north side of the choir. It seems that the shape corresponds to the shape of the church that burned.

The church, like most other churches in Norway, was sold into private ownership during the Norwegian church sale in 1723 to help the King pay off war debts. In 1752, the church was sold to the local residents of the area. In 1842, Lier Municipality took over the ownership of the church.

=== Election church ===
In 1814, this church served as an election church (Norwegian: valgkirke). Together with more than 300 other parish churches across Norway, it was a polling station for elections to the 1814 Norwegian Constituent Assembly which wrote the Constitution of Norway. This was Norway's first national election. Each church parish was a constituency that elected people called "electors" who later met together in each county to elect the representatives for the assembly that was to meet at Eidsvoll Manor later that year.

== Media gallery ==
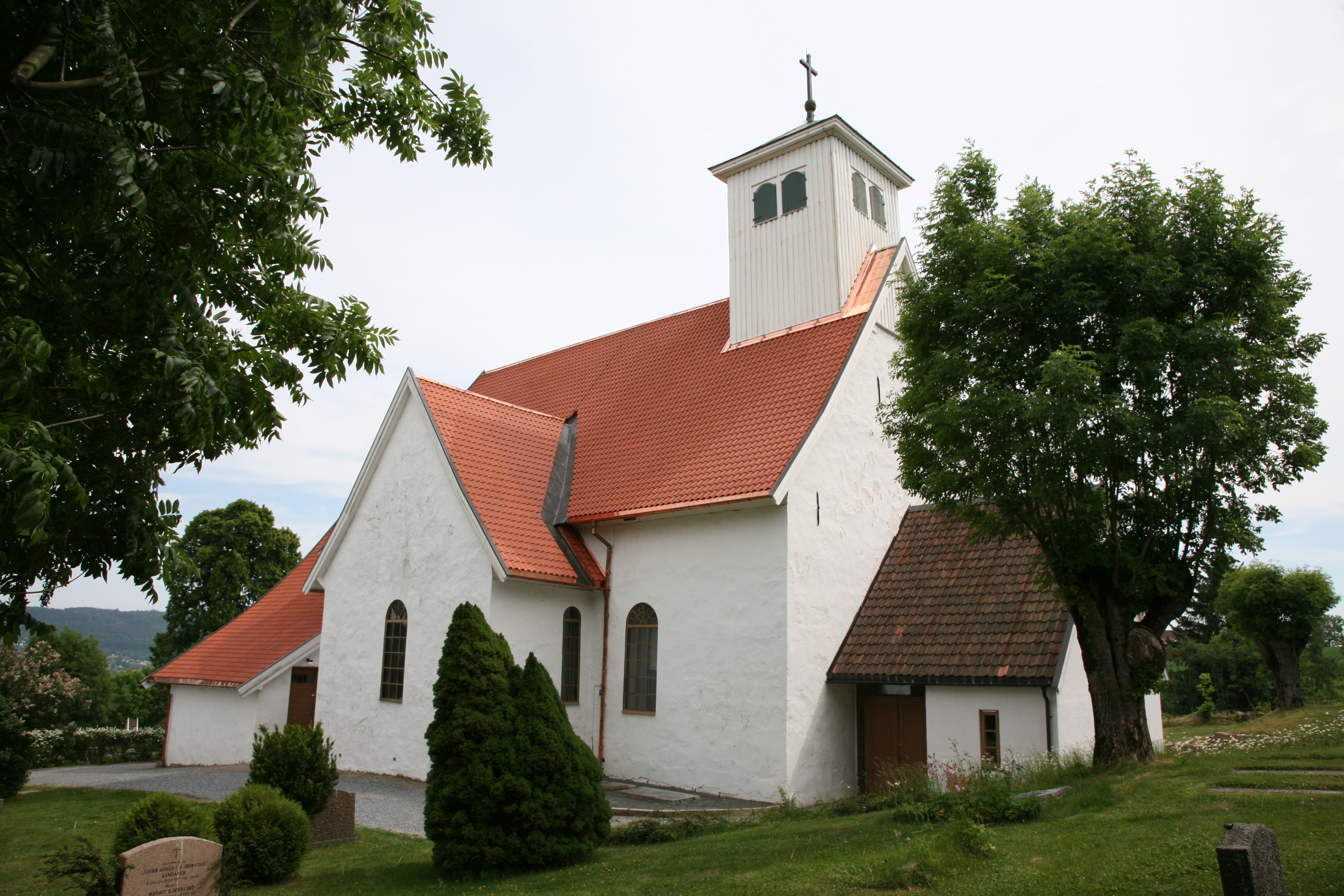

== See also ==
- List of churches in Tunsberg
