= Bragernes =

Area of Drammen, Norway

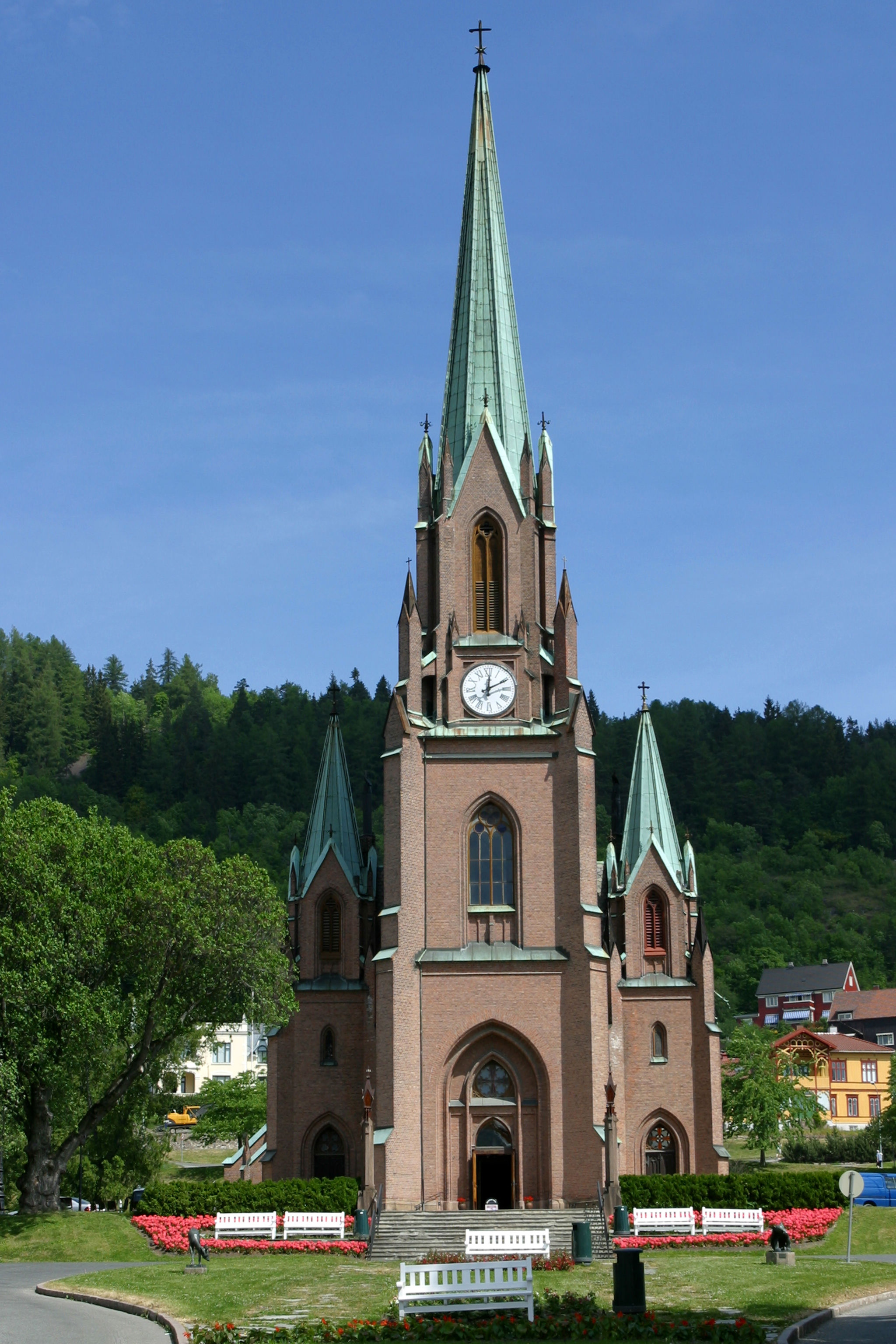
Bragernes Church

Bragernes is one of the central areas of the city of Drammen in Buskerud, Norway, on the north side of the Drammen River (Drammenselva).

== Bragernes Church ==
Bragernes Church (Bragernes kirke) was erected in 1871 in neo-Gothic style in the heights towards the hill. Its altarpiece with the Resurrection by Adolph Tidemand has been copied in many other churches within Norway. The carillon has 35 bells.

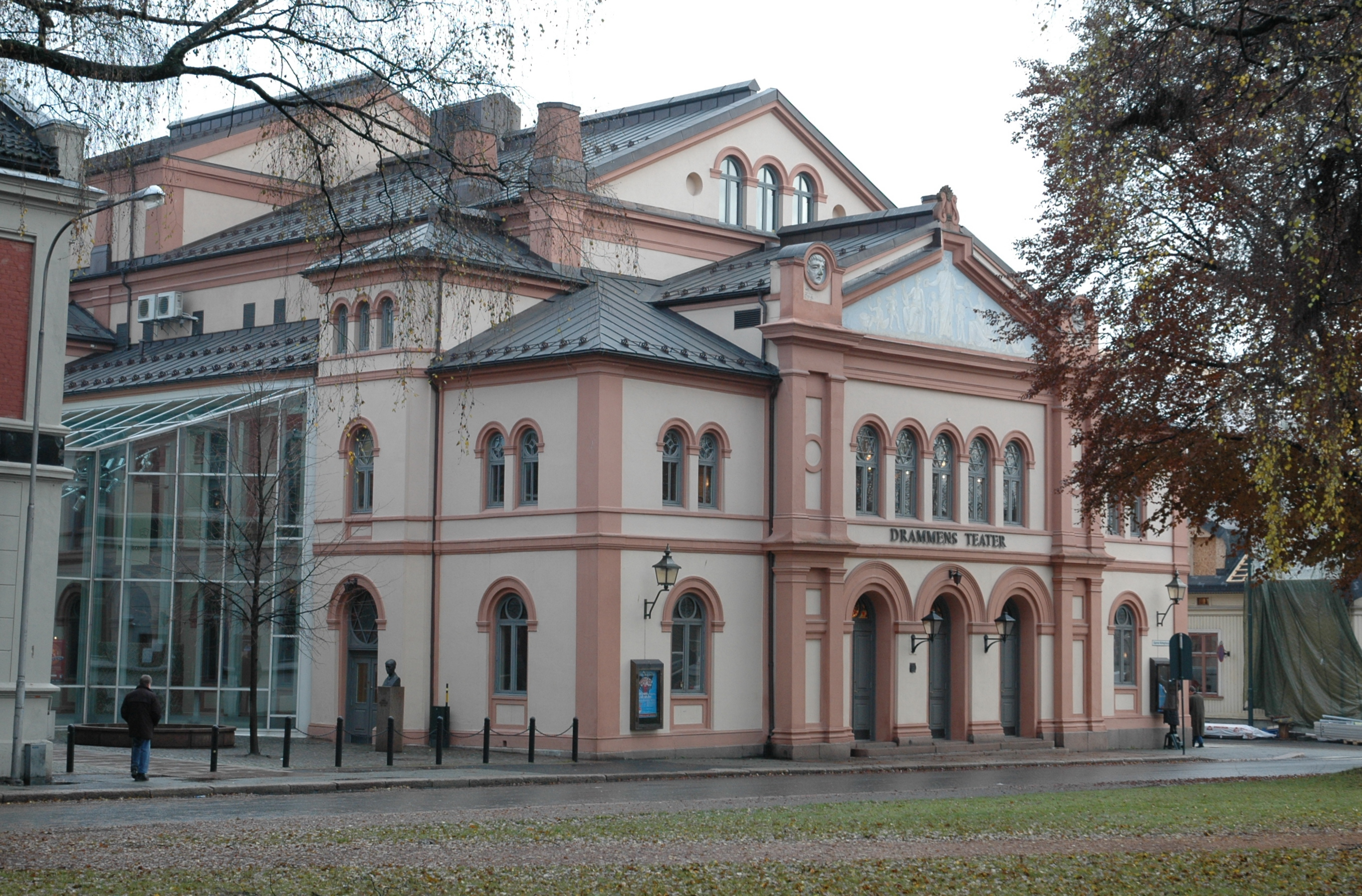
Drammen Theater

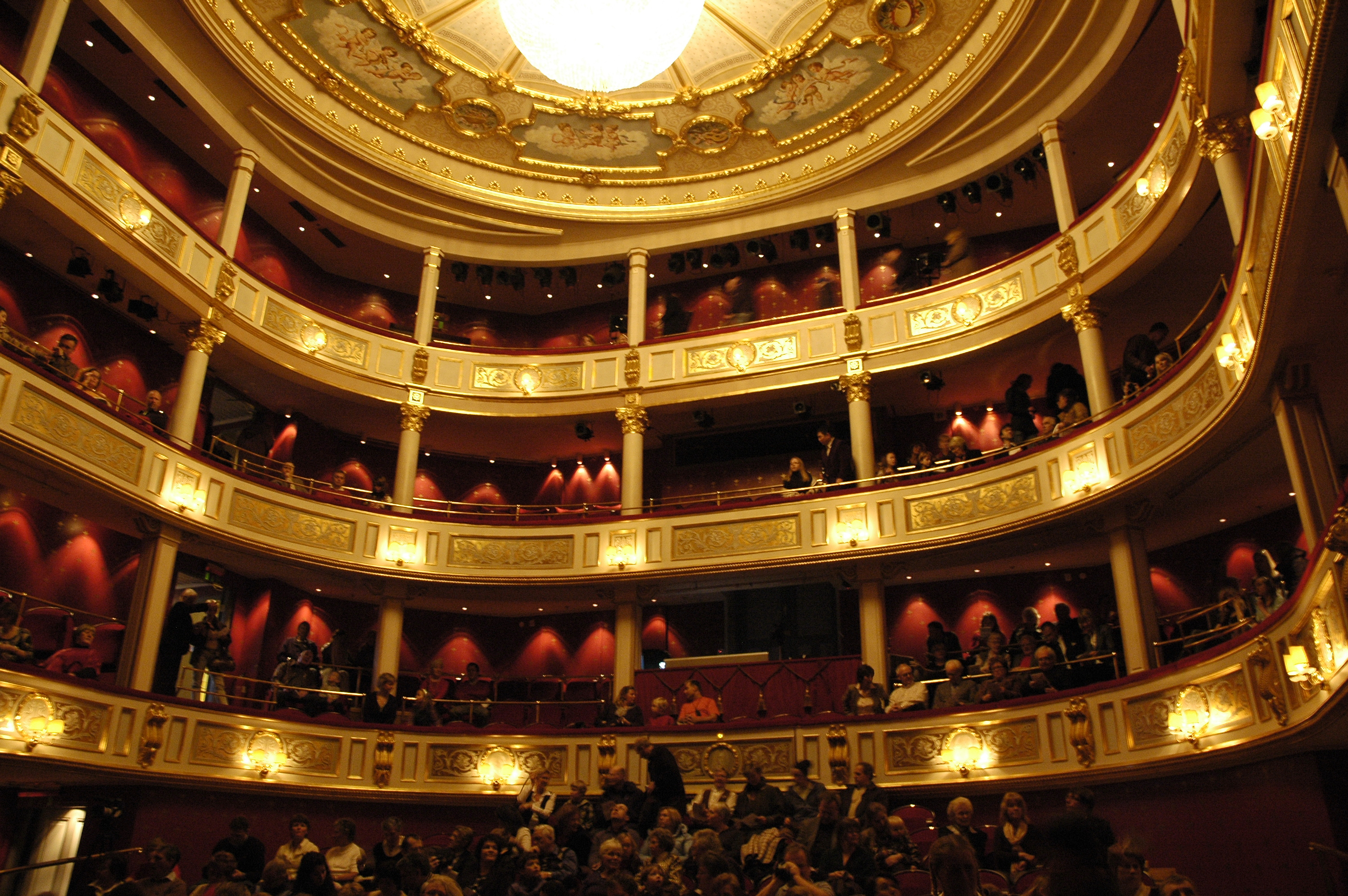
Interior of Drammen Theater

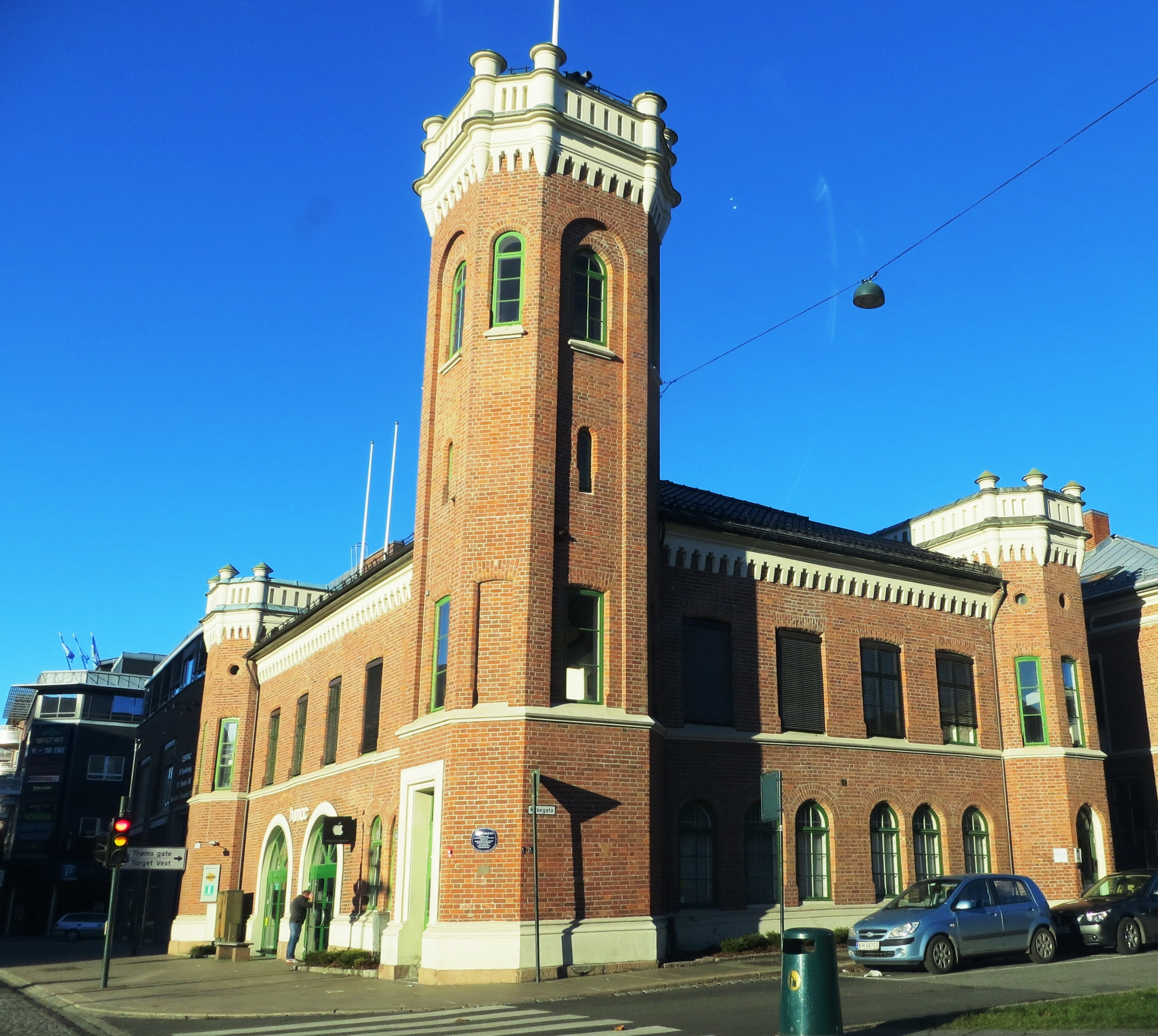
Old Firehouse, dating from 1867

== Drammen Theater ==
Drammen Theater (Drammens Teater) in Drammen was built in 1869 and was designed by Swedish architect Emil Victor Langlet (1824-1898). The theater was designed by the same model as Parisian theaters as the Châtelet, and performed in a complex Renaissance style with symmetrical facades and round arched windows. The theater was the first modern theater house in the country and was regarded as one of the most beautiful in the Nordic countries.

A fire in December 1993 destroyed Drammen Theater and an exact copy was rebuilt on the site.

== Bragernes Square ==
Bragernes Square (Bragernes Torg), the main square in Drammen, is Norway's largest square.
