= Log house =

House built from wooden logs

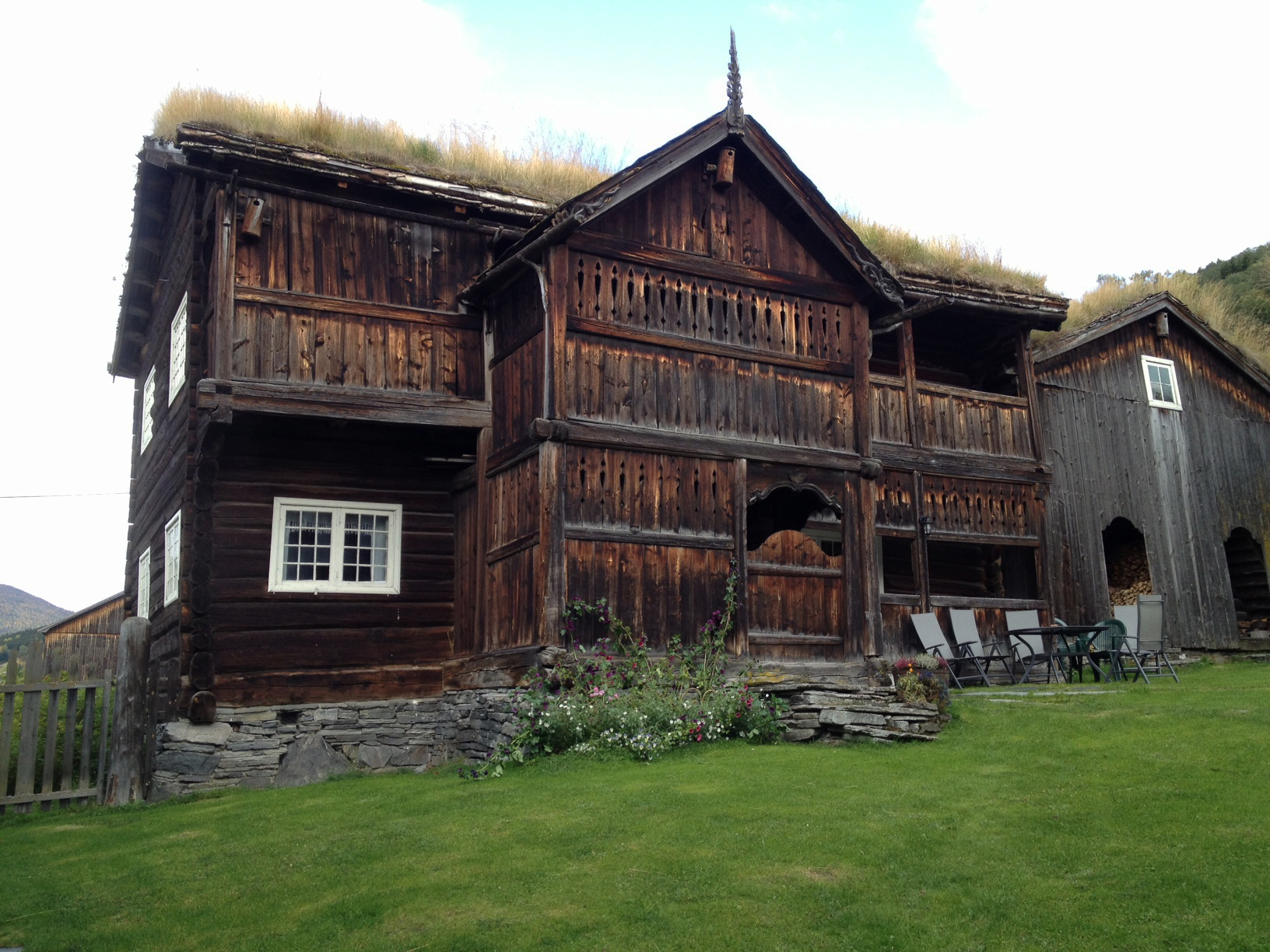
A 17th-century log farmhouse in Heidal, Norway

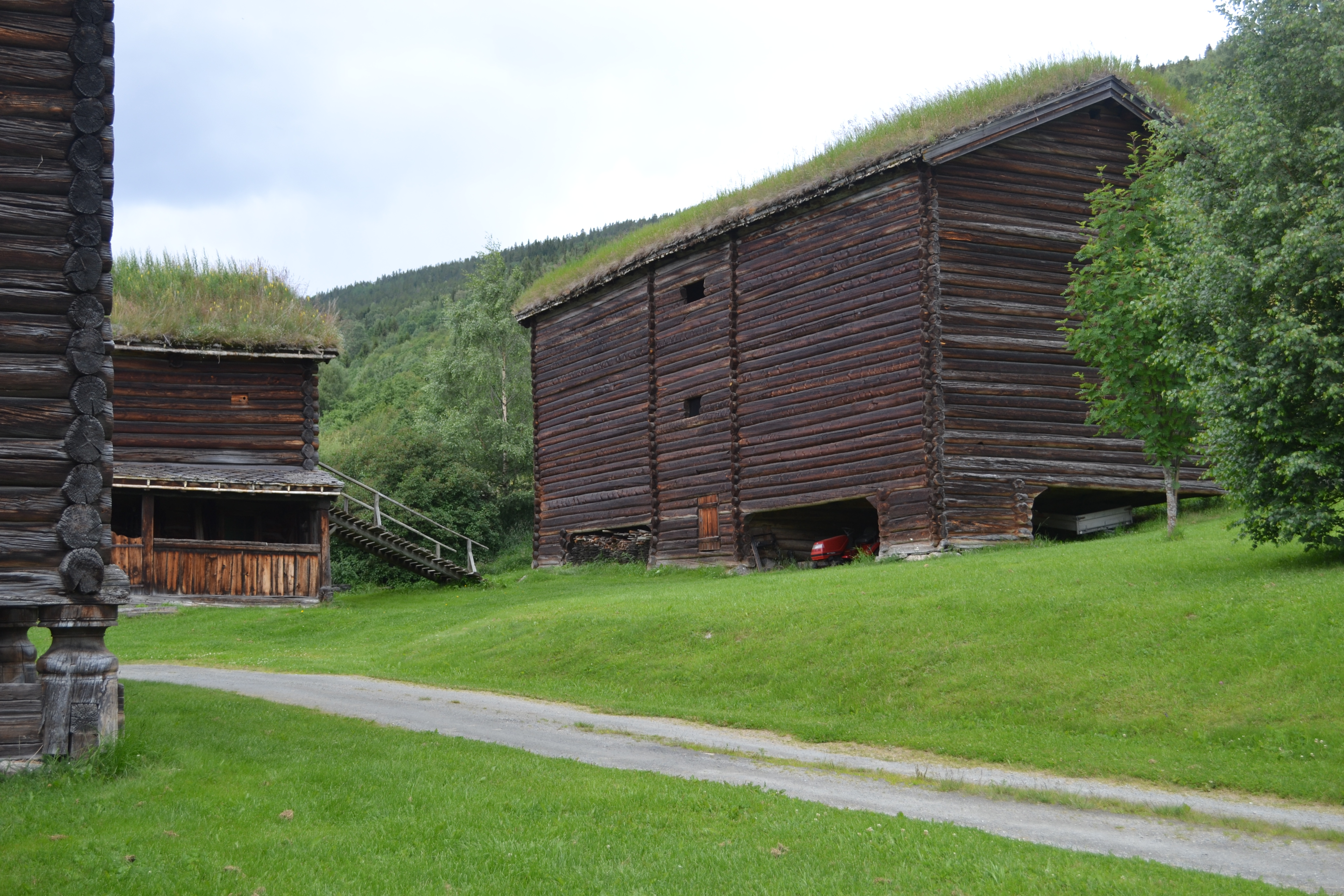
17th-century log buildings in Heidal, Norway; the corner house is a horse stable and log barn

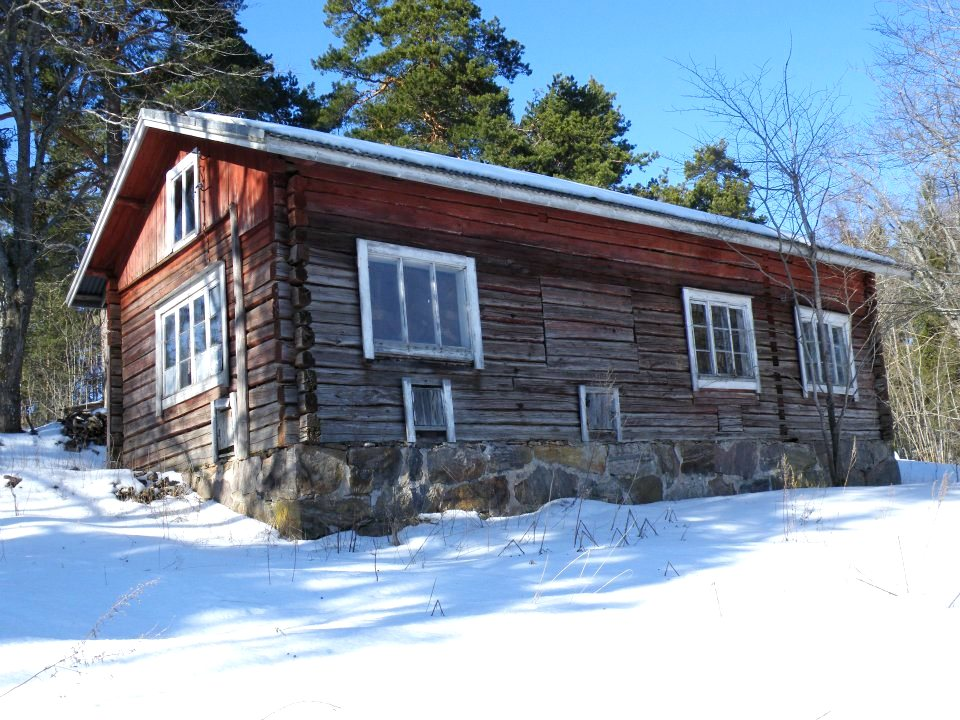
A log house in Pargas, Finland

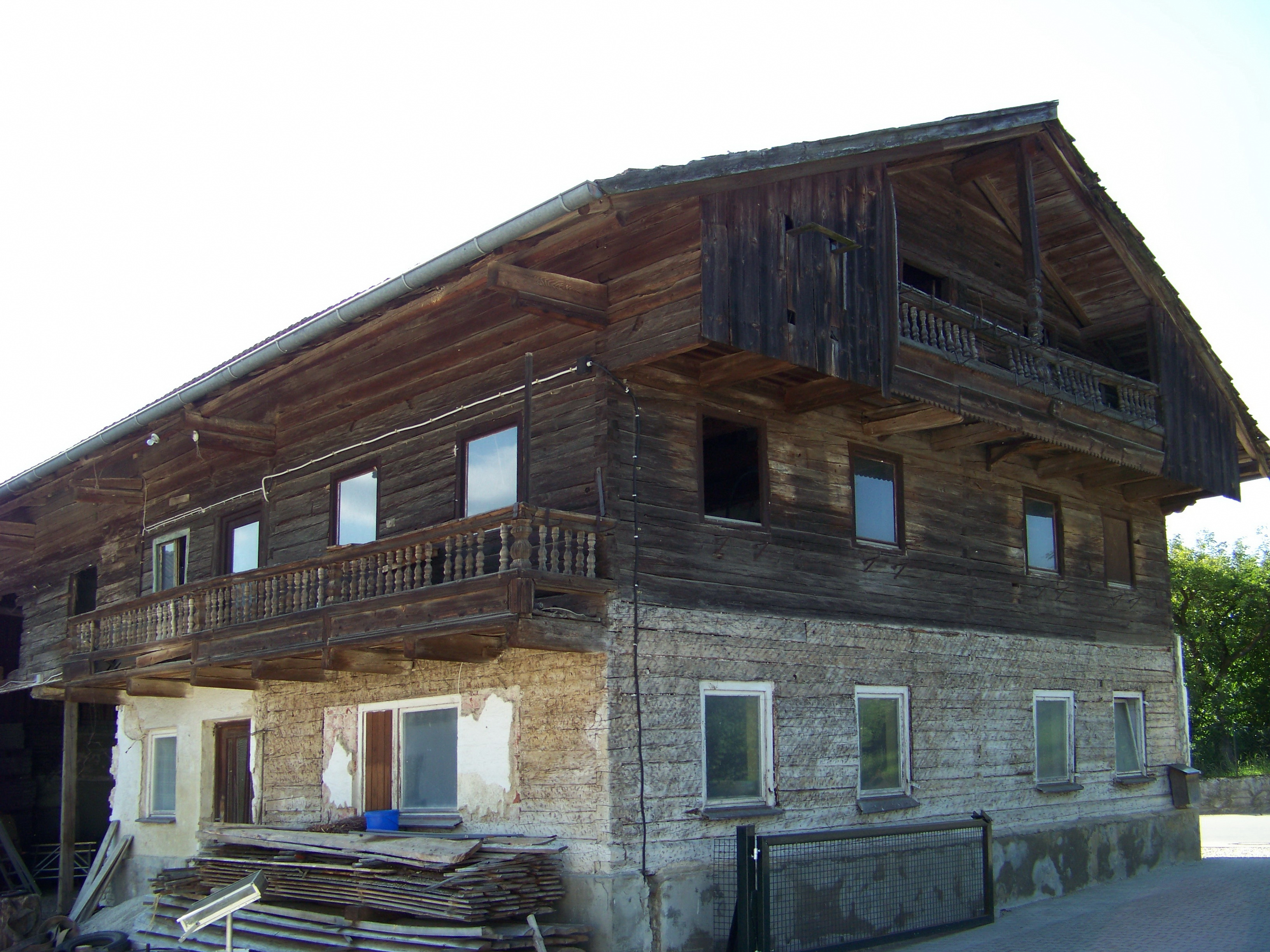
A log building, known as Blockbau, in Bavaria, Germany

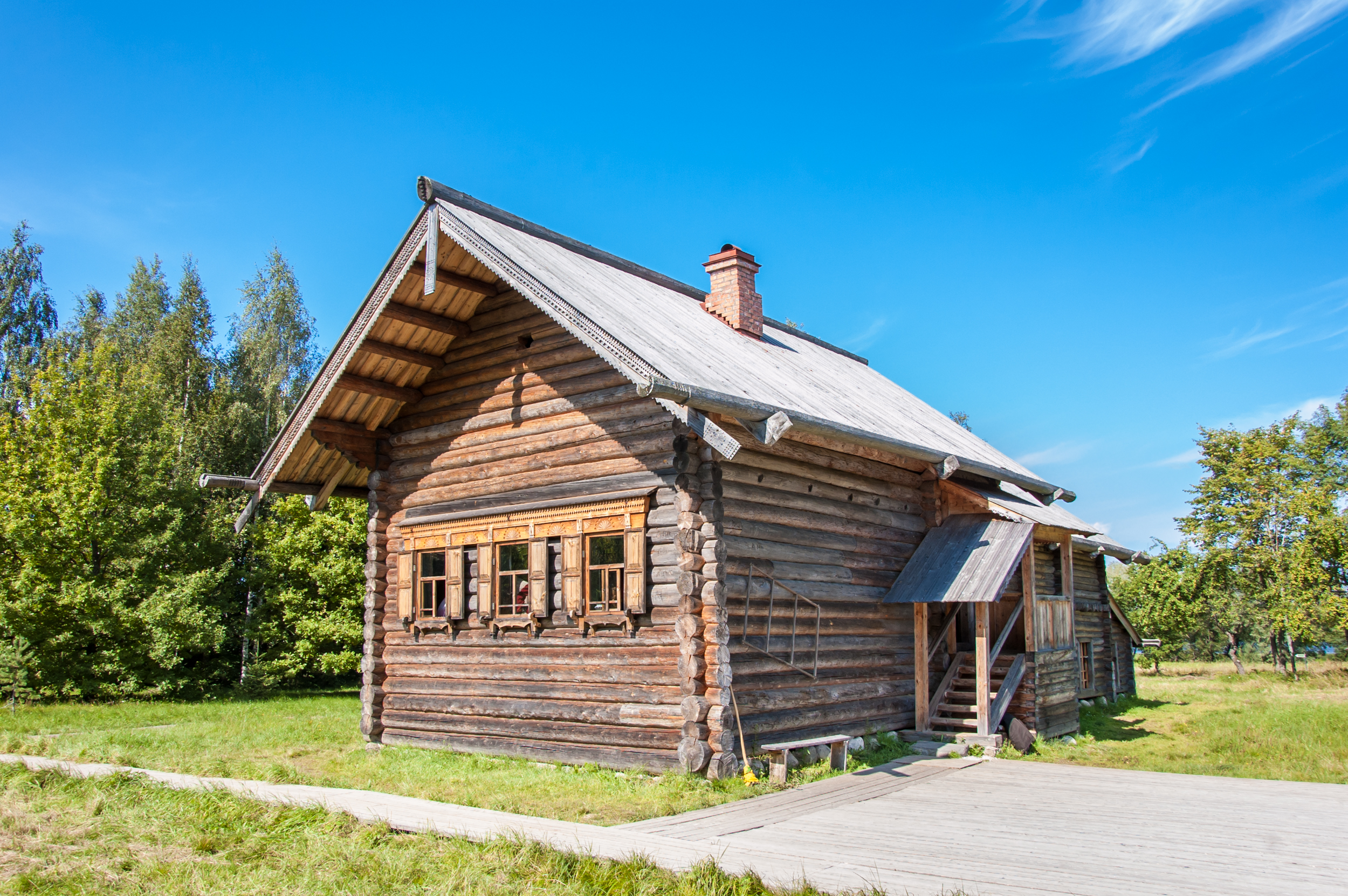
A Russian-style log house

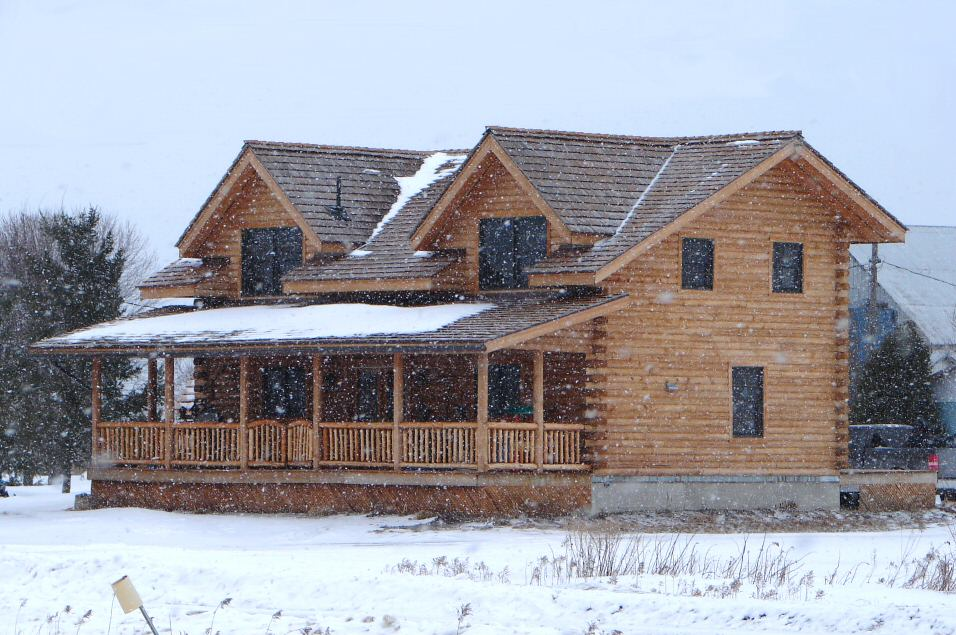
An American-style log house

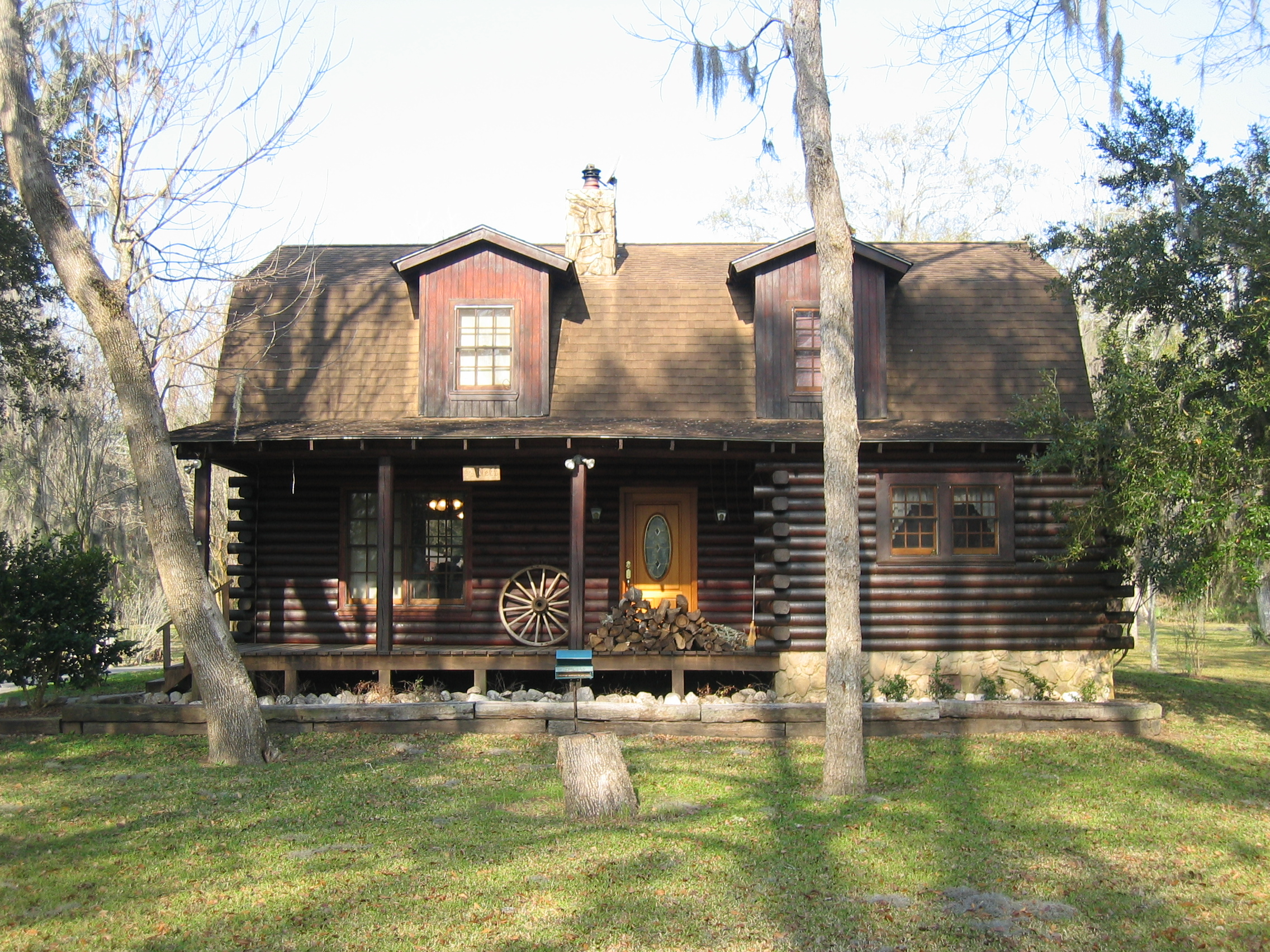
A milled log house

A log house, or log building, is a structure built with horizontal logs interlocked at the corners by notching. Logs may be round, squared or hewn to other shapes, either handcrafted or milled. The term "log cabin" generally refers to a smaller, more rustic log house, such as a hunting cabin in the woods, that may or may not have electricity or plumbing.

== History ==
Log construction was the most common building technique in large regions of Sweden, Finland, Norway, the Baltic states, and Russia, where straight and tall coniferous trees, such as pine and spruce, are readily available. It was also widely used for vernacular buildings in Eastern Central Europe, the Alps, the Balkans and parts of Asia, where similar climatic conditions prevail. In warmer and more westerly regions of Europe, where deciduous trees predominate, timber framing was favoured instead.

The two initial primary styles of log houses included:

- Sawn logs, which had logs sawn to a standard width but with their original heights.
- Milled, or machine-profiled, logs, made with a log house moulder and constructed with logs run through a manufacturing process, converting them into timbers consistent in size and appearance

Handcrafted log houses have been built for centuries in Fennoscandia and Fenno-Ugric areas such as Karelia, Lapland, and Eastern parts of Finland. Also in Scandinavia, Russia and Eastern Europe, and were typically built using only an axe, knife and log scriber.

Settlers from northern Europe brought the craft of log cabin construction to North America in the early 17th century, where it was quickly adopted by other colonists and Native Americans. C. A. Nothnagle Log House, built in New Jersey circa 1640, is likely the oldest log cabin in the United States.

Pre-fabricated log houses for export were manufactured in Norway from the 1880s until around 1920 by three large companies: Jacob Digre in Trondheim, M. Thams & Co. in Orkanger, and Strømmen Trævarefabrik at Strømmen. They were factory-built from sawn or milled logs, numbered and dismantled for transportation, and reassembled on the buyer's site. Buyers could order standard models from catalogs, custom-made houses designed by architects employed by the companies, or houses of their design. Log houses from Thams were exhibited at the Exposition Universelle (1889) in Paris.

The first American milled log houses appeared on the market in the 1920s, using pre-cut and shaped logs rather than hand-hewn ones. Many log houses today are milled, mainly because they require less labor-intensive fieldwork than handcrafted houses. About 500 companies in North America build the handcrafted, scribe-fit type of log house.

== Components ==
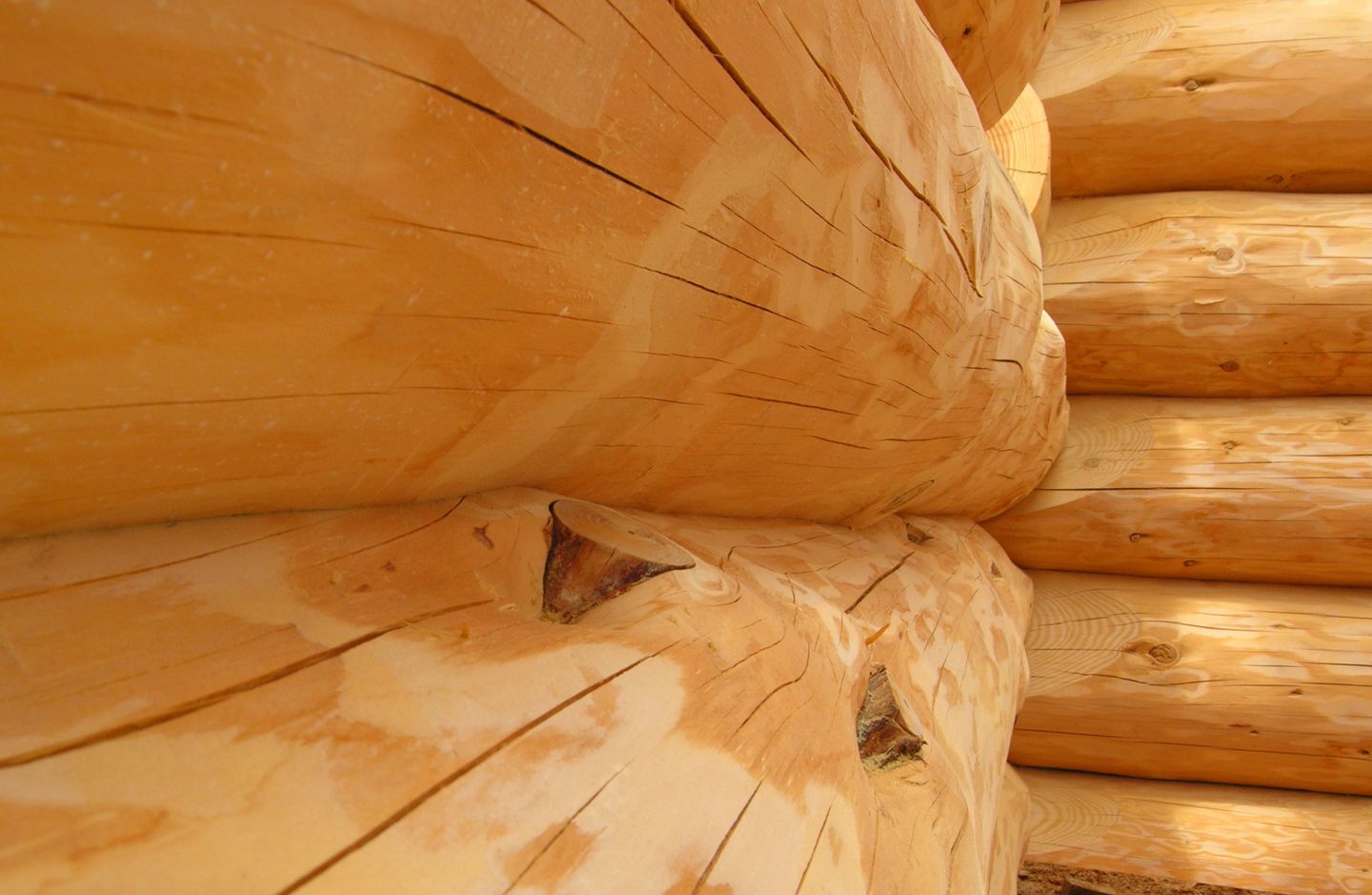
Scribe-fit logs

The logs in log houses have a varying degree of moisture content; all logs have moisture when freshly cut. Handcrafted logs moisture will naturally leave the timber, drying it out until it stabilizes with its climate. This drying-out causes movement and shrinking of the log's diameter. As logs and timbers dry, the differential shrinkage (radial versus tangential) causes small cracks (known as "checks") to open slowly over time. Checking is a natural process in both air- and kiln-dried logs. This occurs in all log houses regardless of construction method or how the timber is allowed to dry, and is considered normal.

Milled logs are processed in a different manner from handcrafted logs. Logs destined to become milled logs may become one of several types, depending on the desired quality and results.

=== Green logs ===
Logs that are cut from the butt forest, brought to a mill or to a log-house construction yard, have their bark removed and are used to build a log-house shell, handcrafted log houses, or sent through profiling machines usually referred to as "green" logs if they have not been air- or kiln-dried. "Green" does not refer to color, but to moisture content. The actual moisture content of "green" logs varies considerably with tree species, the season in which it was cut, and whether sapwood or heartwood is being measured. Green logs may have a moisture content ranging from about 20% to 90%.

One type of air-dried log is "dead standing," which refers to trees which have died from natural causes (bug kill, virus, fire etc.) and cut down after they died. Standing dead trees may be cut one month or several decades after they died, so the term "dead standing" does not necessarily mean the logs have dried down to equilibrium moisture content. Dead standing logs can be green, or more-or-less dry.

After construction, green logs dry in service in the log building. Within about four years, green logs which are part of a completed log house reach equilibrium with local conditions and have an equilibrium moisture content of between 6% and 12%, which varies by local climate, season and location.

=== Air-dried logs ===
Some log home companies let the fresh-cut logs (or milled timbers) sit outside in the open air to dry naturally. The timbers may be stacked with spacers (known as "stickers") between them. This process allows the moisture content of the logs to naturally fall as the timber dries. In areas of high humidity, it may require as much as one year per inch of log thickness to dry. Arid climates may require less. A log with a diameter of 8 inches will usually reach equilibrium in about 18 months in the Rocky Mountains of North America. Air circulation is critical or the logs may begin to rot before properly drying, especially in humid regions. If the logs are to be dried to equilibrium with the local climate the process may take several years, depending on the location and size of the timbers. In some environments, the logs must be kept under some type of roof or cover to reduce the impact of rain storms on the drying process.

Once the logs have dried for the desired length of time, they are profiled prior to shipping. Profiling usually does not take place until shortly before shipment, to ensure that the logs stay as uniform as possible. It is uncertain whether this process is advantageous; it depends on many factors such as local climate, wood species, its size, and the location of the log structure.

=== Kiln-dried logs ===
Mills that have a kiln on site have the option of artificially accelerating the drying process. Green timber is placed inside a large oven, where heat removes moisture from them; however, they can suffer severe checking and cracking if the kiln controls are not properly monitored during the drying process. Use of a kiln can reduce the drying time from many months to several weeks. Kiln-drying usually results in an average moisture content of 18–20% ("average" means the average moisture content of the outside and the center of the log).

In North America, logs reach equilibrium moisture content at about 6% and 12%; since most kiln-dried logs are dried down to about 18% to 20% moisture content, kiln-dried logs can be expected to shrink and settle over time, but to a lesser extent than green logs.

=== Glue-laminated timber ===
"Laminated" or "engineered" logs are a different approach to log-house building. Full trees or (alternatively) sawn cants (unfinished logs to be further processed) are brought to a mill with a dry kiln, the bark is removed and the trees are sawn into boards usually no more than two inches thick. These boards are then taken to the dry kiln, where (because of their size) they can be dried without causing severe damage to the wood. Timber destined for glue lamination must be brought down below 15% moisture before the lamination process will work, so typically these timbers are dried to around 8–10% moisture. The drying process varies on the species of lumber, but can be done in as little as a week. Once the drying process is complete the planks are sent through a surfacer (or planer), which makes the face of the lumber perfectly smooth. These planks travel to a machine, which then spreads a special glue on the interior boards. Now there are also Non-Settling log profiles available.

Depending on the type of glue and type of mill, there are two ways to finish the lamination process. One type of glue reacts with radio-frequency (RF) energy to cure the glue in minutes; the other uses a high-pressure clamp, which holds the newly reassembled timbers under pressure for 24 hours. Once the glue has dried, the result is a "log cant" that is slightly larger than the buyer's desired profile. These log cants are run through a profiler, and the end result is a log that is perfectly straight and uniform. Some mills are capable of joining together small timbers by using a combination of face and edge gluing and a process known as finger- jointing. Boards which would be scrap at another mill may be used in the center of a laminated log or beam to minimize waste.

=== Types of milled logs ===
Milled log homes employ a variety of profiles, which are usually specified by the customer:

- D-shape logs: round on the outside and flat inside
- Full-round logs: fully round inside and out
- Square logs: flat inside and out, and may be milled with a groove which could be chinked. When dealing with milled logs, chinking is a personal preference and not required to seal a house; however, a log house will eventually leak if it is not properly sealed.
- Swedish Cope logs: round inside and out, with a half-moon-shaped groove on the bottom

Nearly every profiled log on the market features an integral tongue and groove milled into the top and bottom of the log; this aids in stacking and reduces the need for chinking. Wood is not airtight, but caulking or chinking improves energy efficiency.

== Construction methods ==
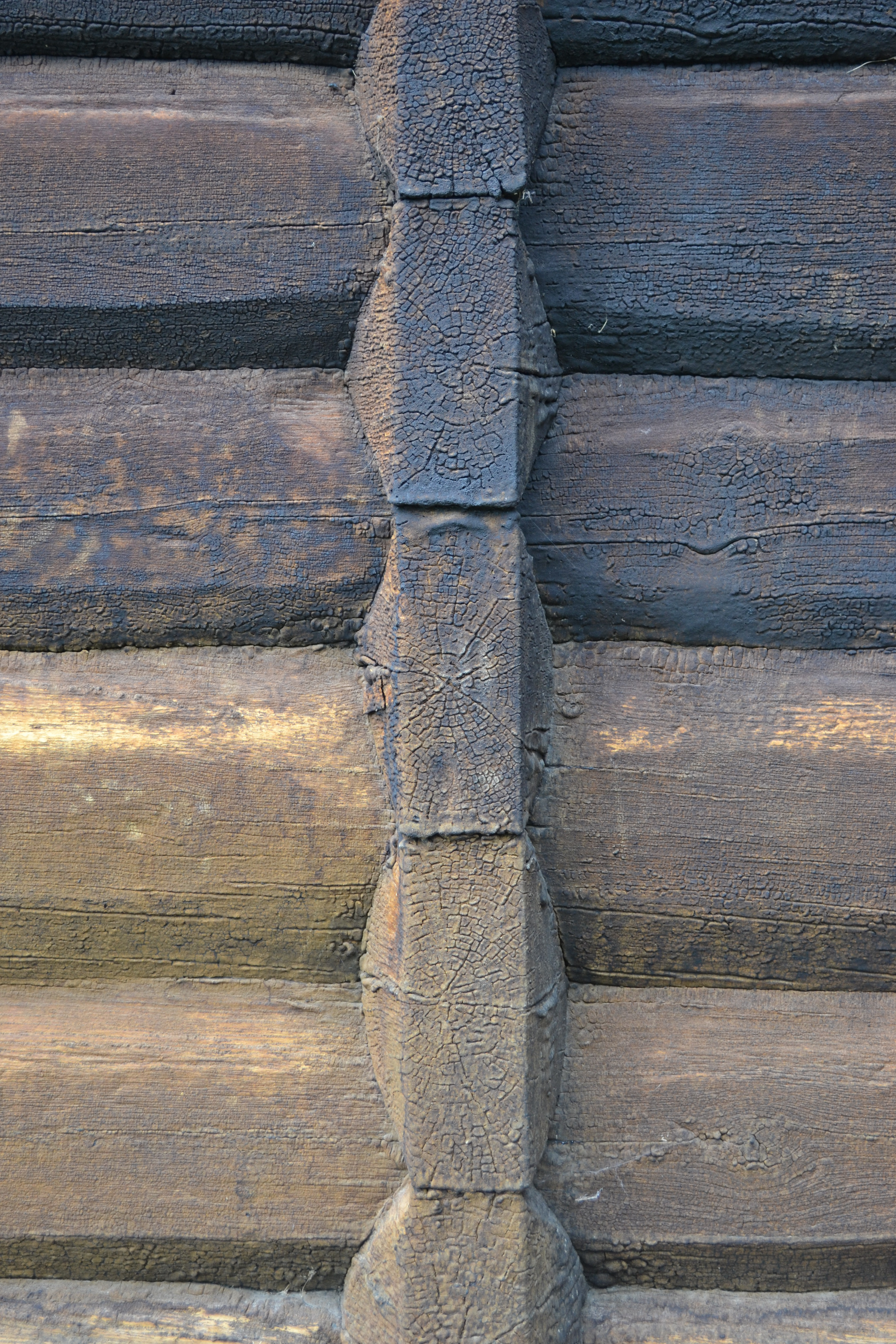
Scandinavian full scribe log construction, an addition to the Lom stave church in Norway

- Scandinavian Full-Scribe, also known as the "chinkless method", is naturally-shaped, smoothly-peeled (drawknifed) logs which are scribed and custom-fitted to one another. They are notched where they overlap at the corners, and there are several ways to notch the logs.
- In the flat-on-flat method, logs are flattened on the top and bottom and then stacked (usually with butt-and-pass corners).
- Milled log houses are constructed with a tongue-and-groove system which helps align one log to another and creates a system to seal out the elements.
- With the tight-pinned butt and pass method, the logs are not notched or milled in any way. They are in a single course and do not overlap; vertical pairs of logs are fastened with tight, load-bearing steel pins.

=== Corner styles ===
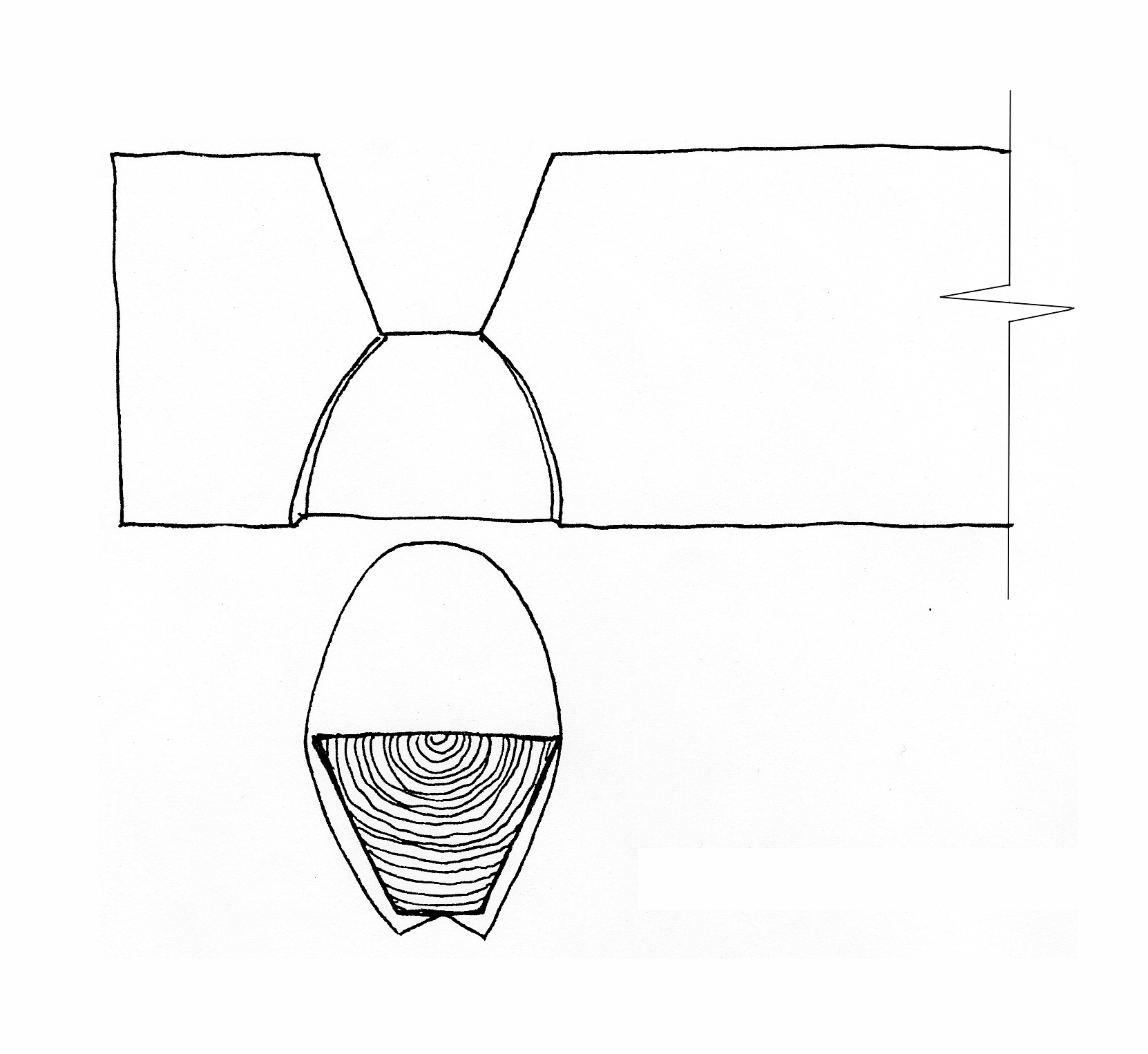
The corner notch in medieval Norwegian log buildings

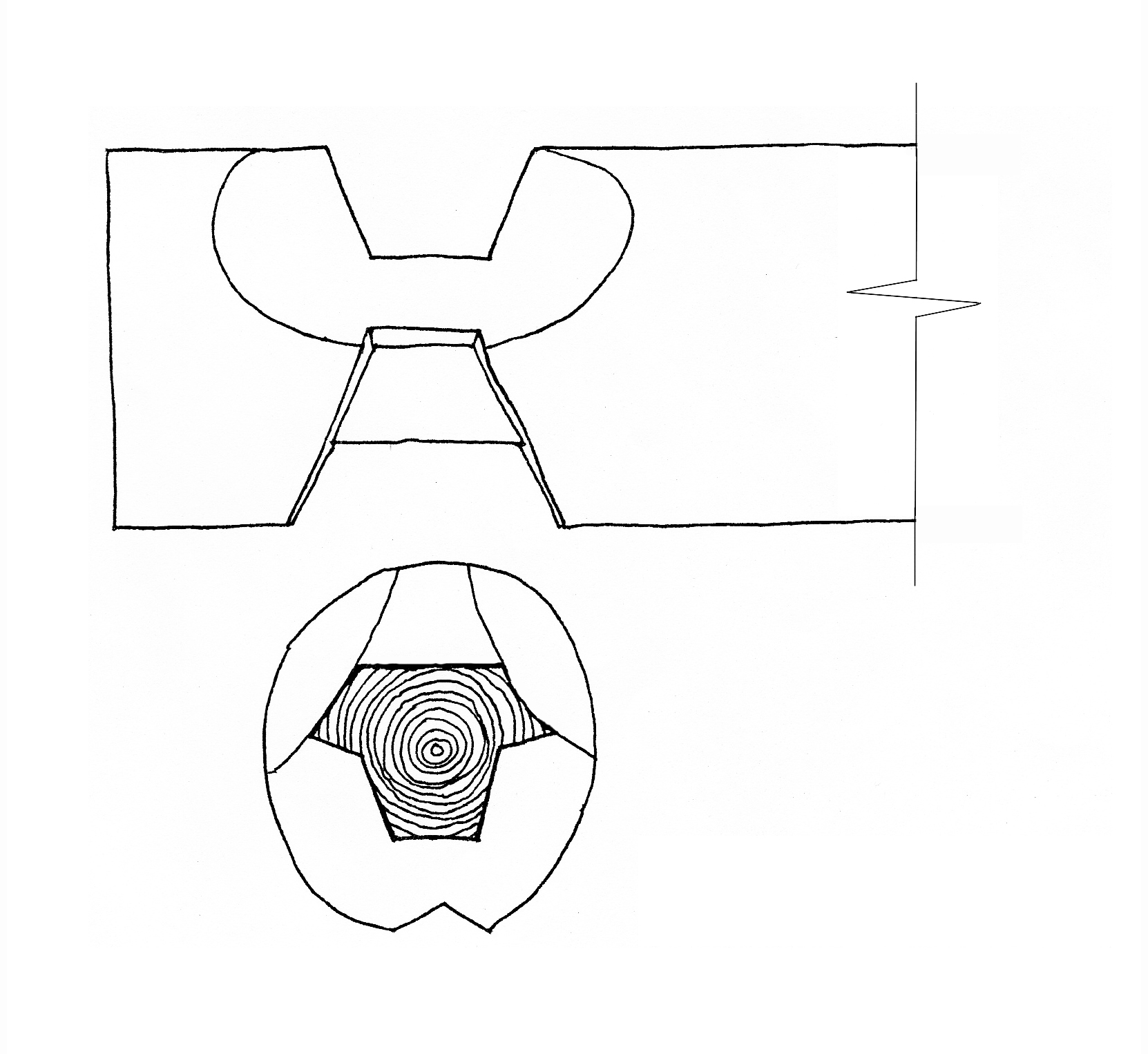
The traditional corner notch used in Norway from the 14th century through the present

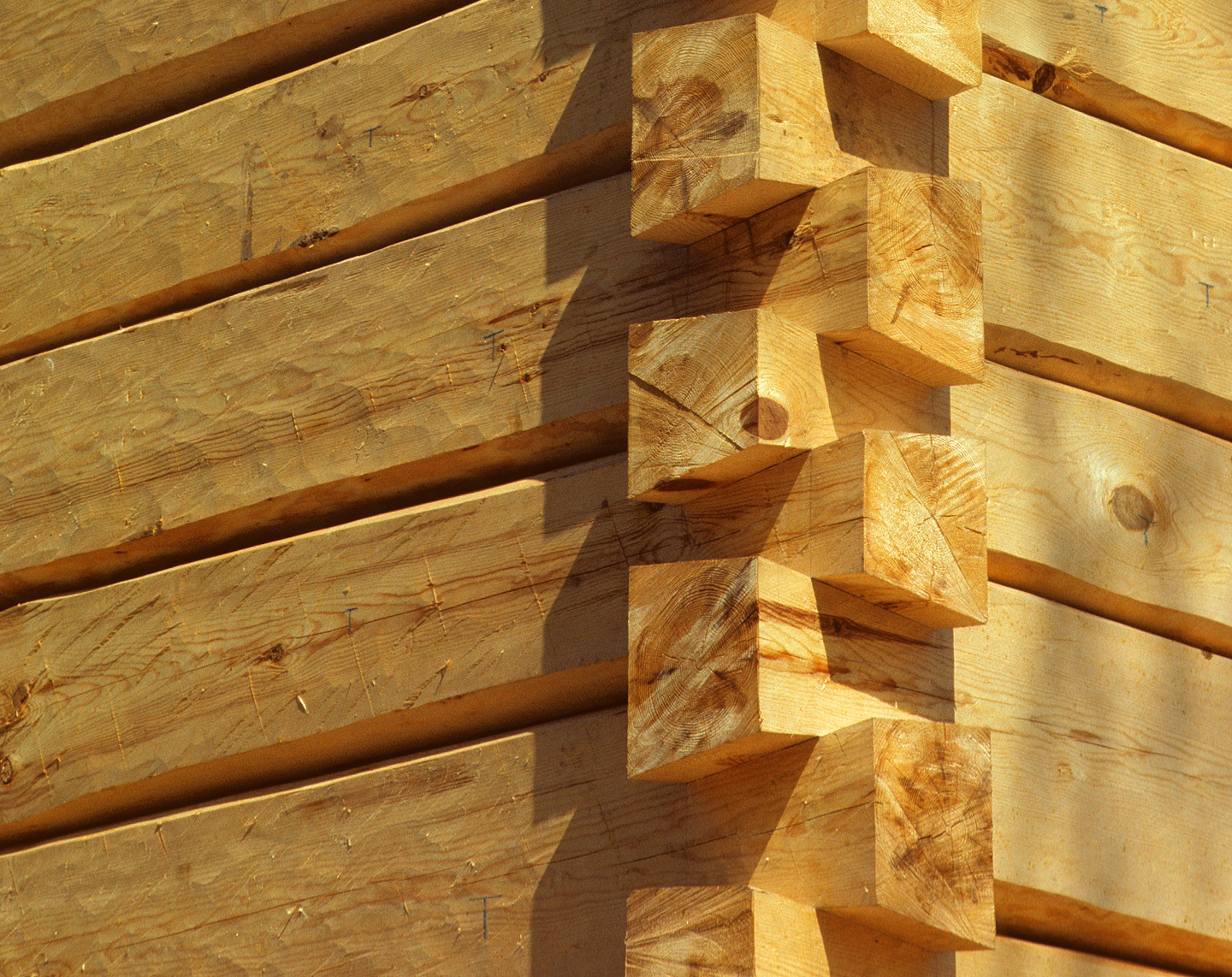
Dovetail corner—handcrafted, full-scribe fit, hand-hewn logs

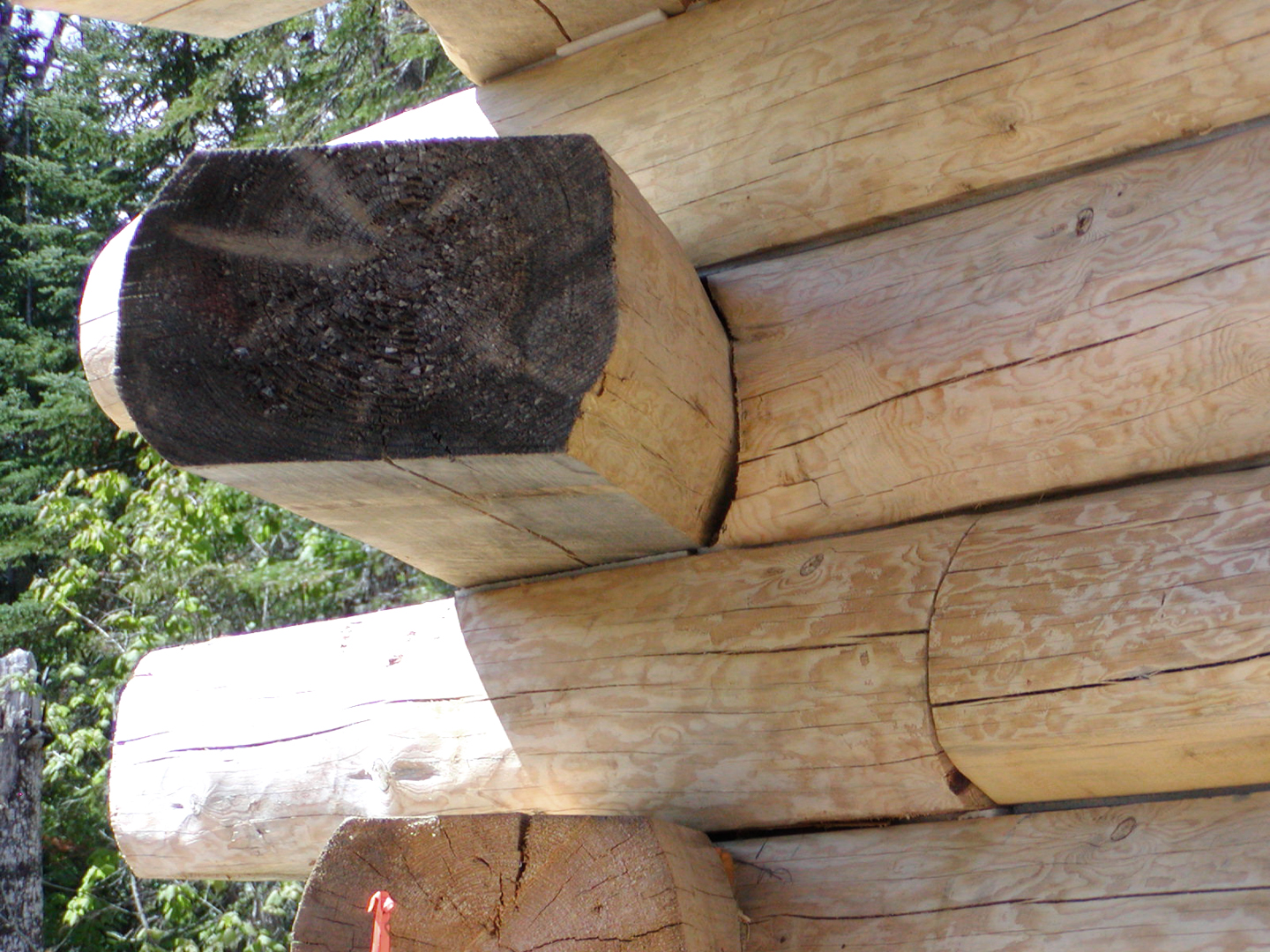
Butt-and-pass corner style logs sawed flat top and bottom

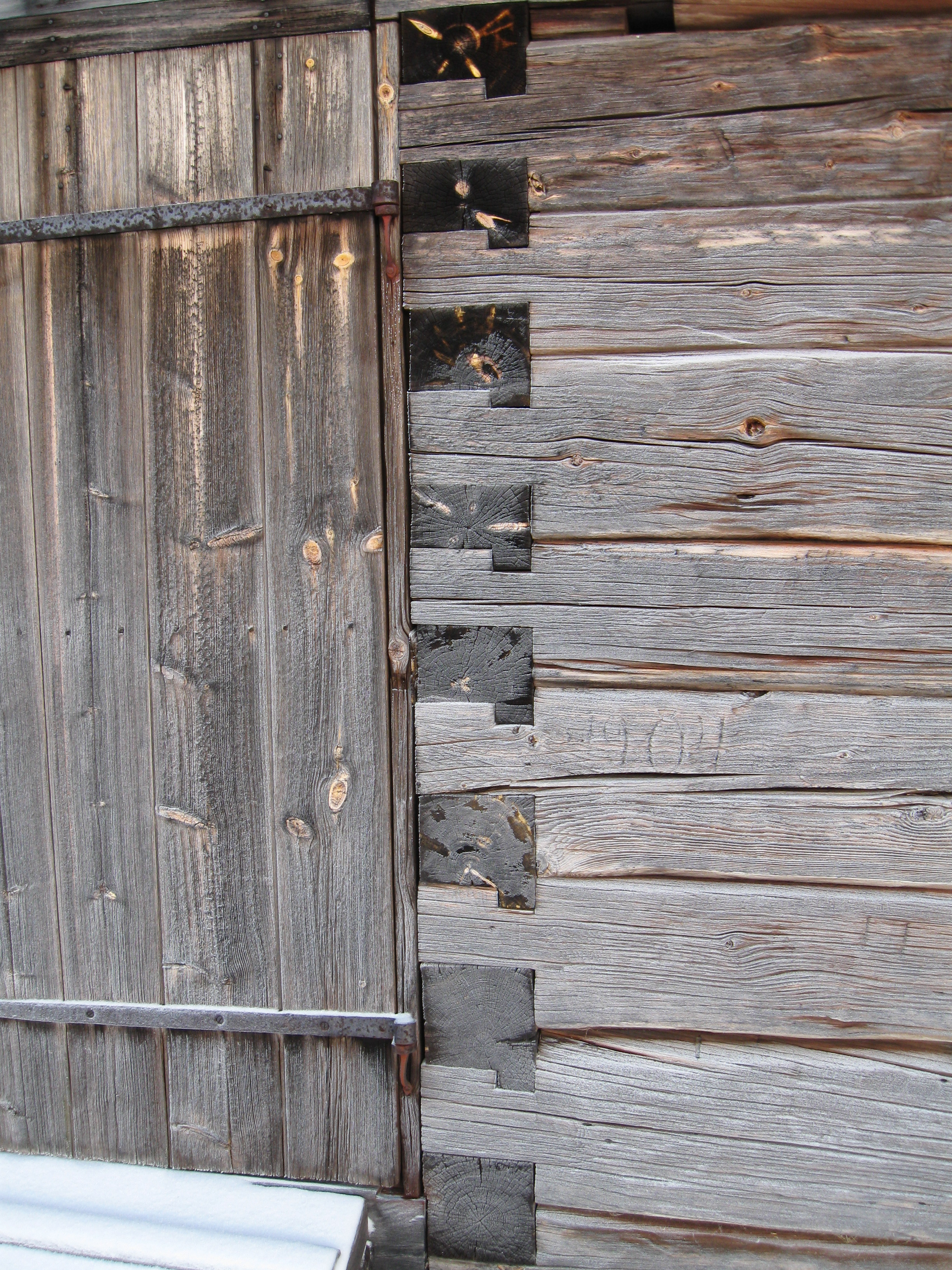
A locked or tooth-edge joint in the door corner of an old wooden storage building at the Lamminaho estate in Vaala, Finland

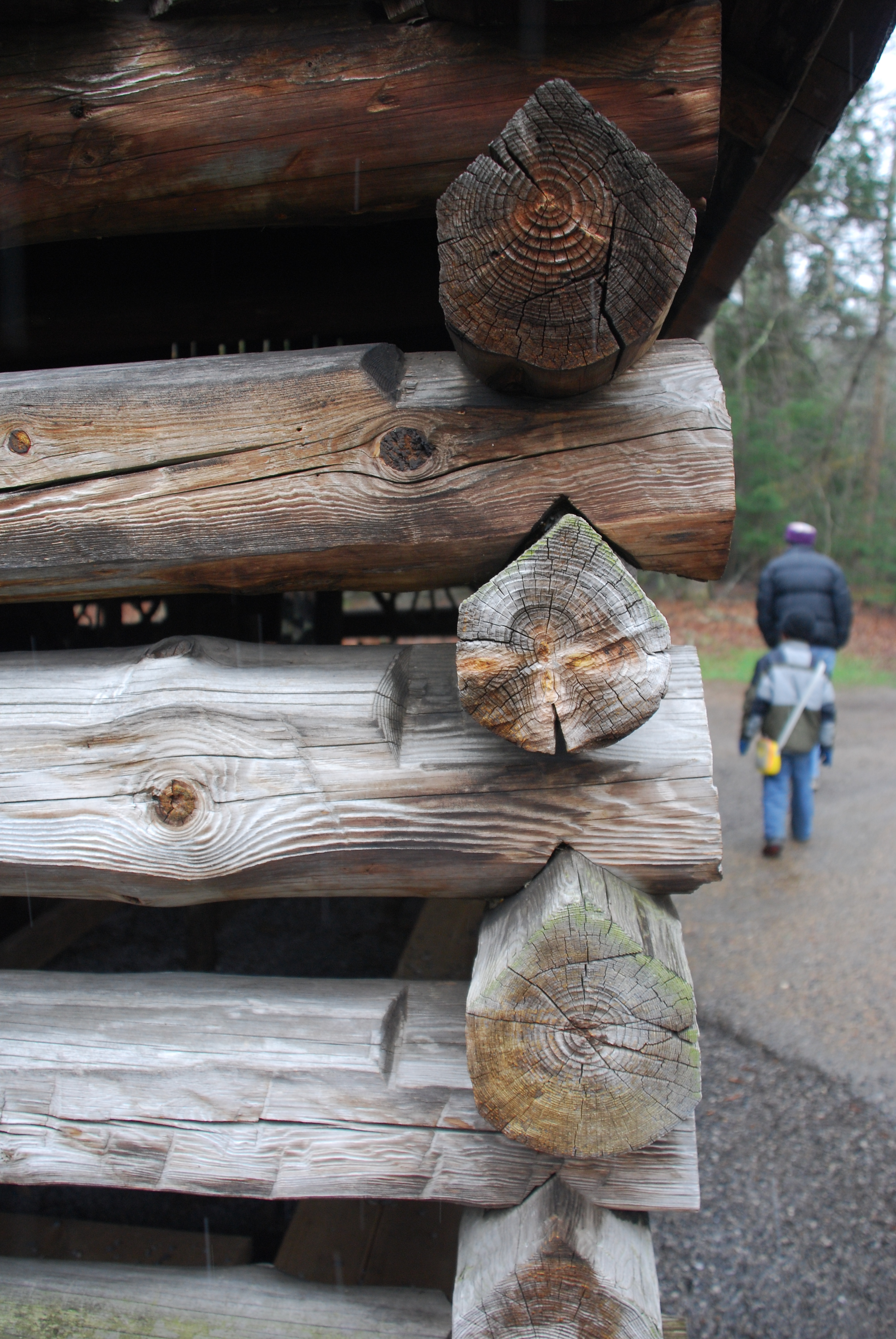
The Cable Mill Blacksmith Shop at Smoky Mountain National Park

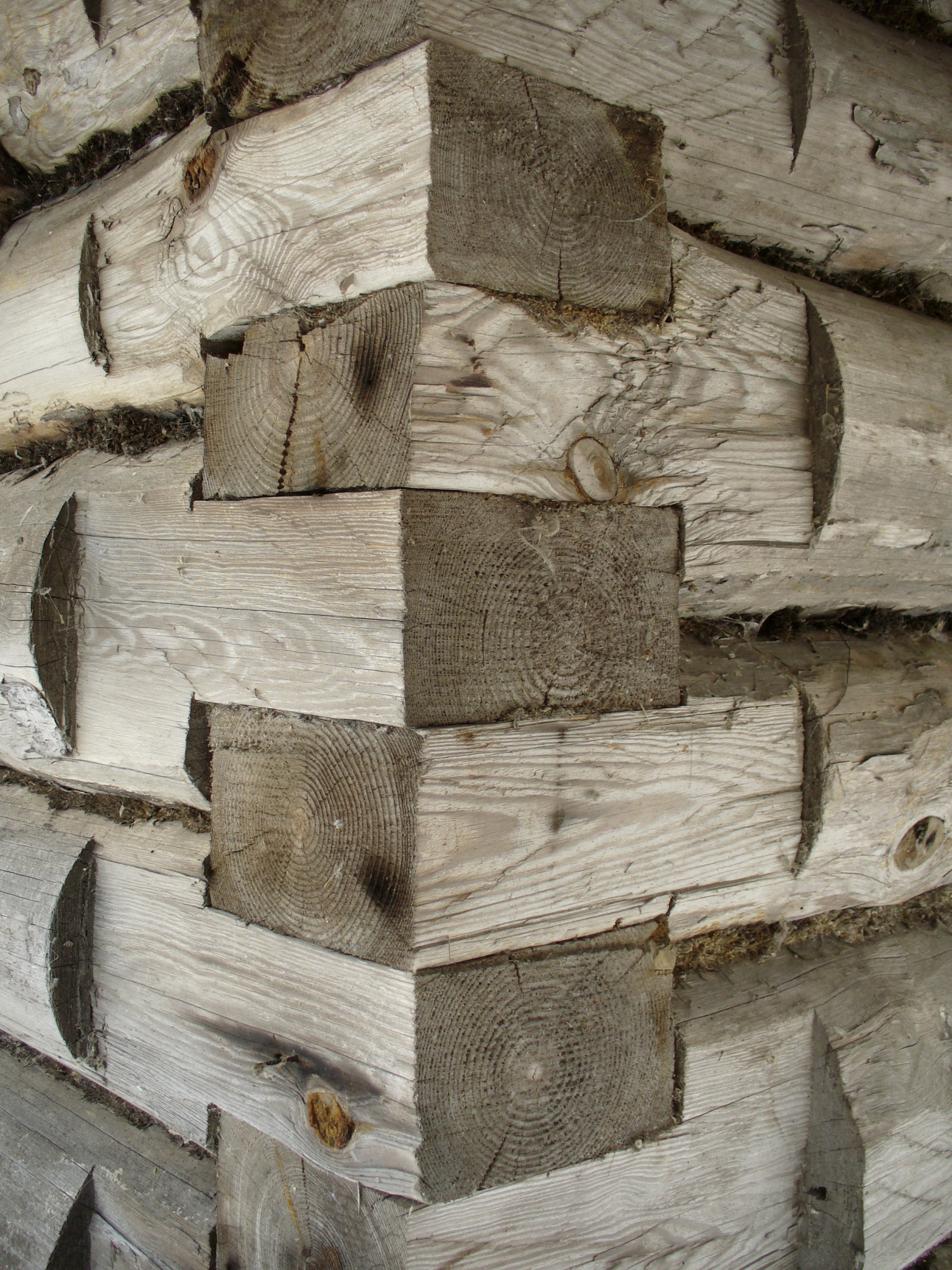
A corner joint in Russia

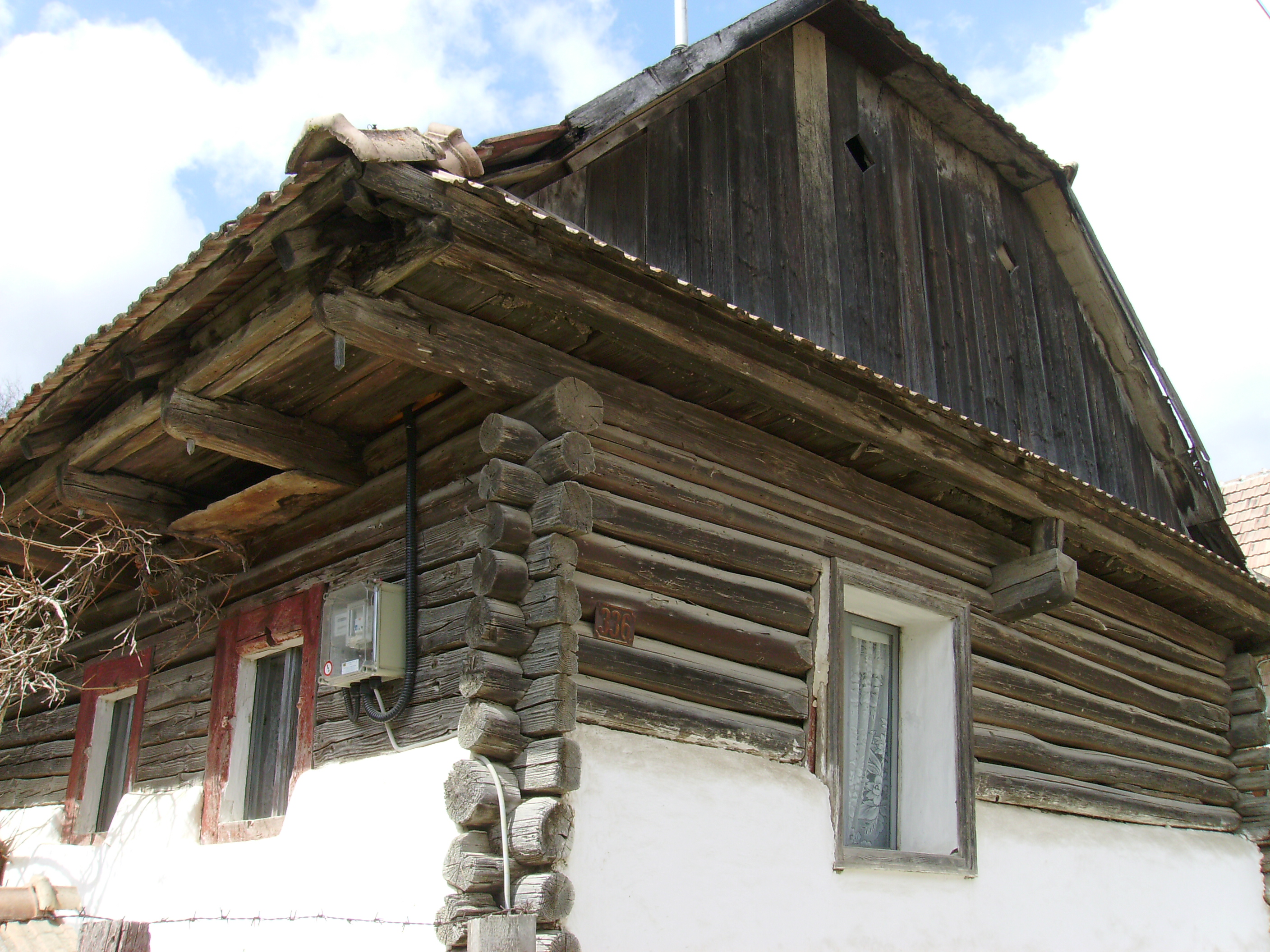
A traditional log house in Rimetea, Transylvania, Romania

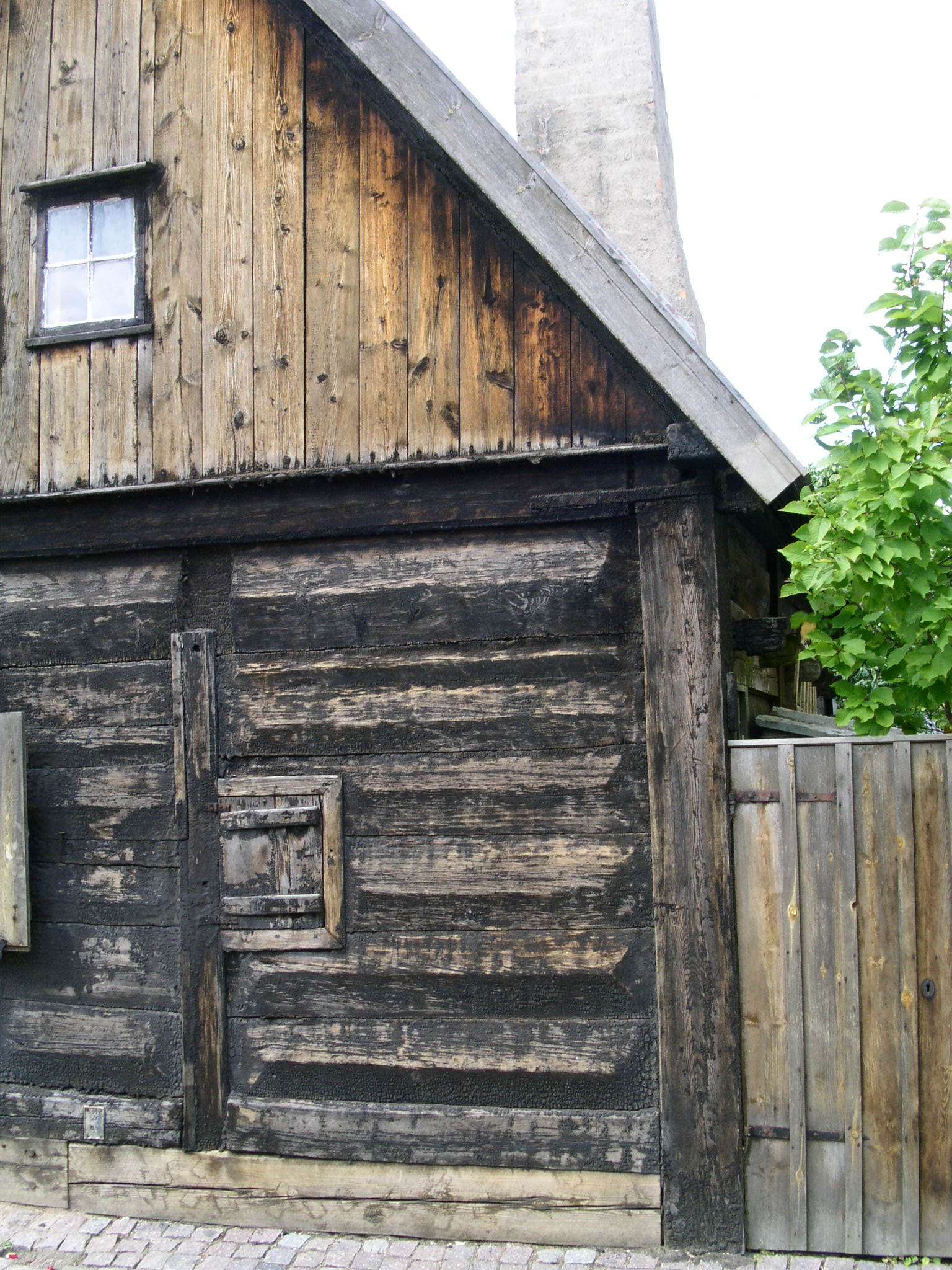
Post-and-plank construction, including timber framing with an infill of logs, at a house in Visby, Sweden

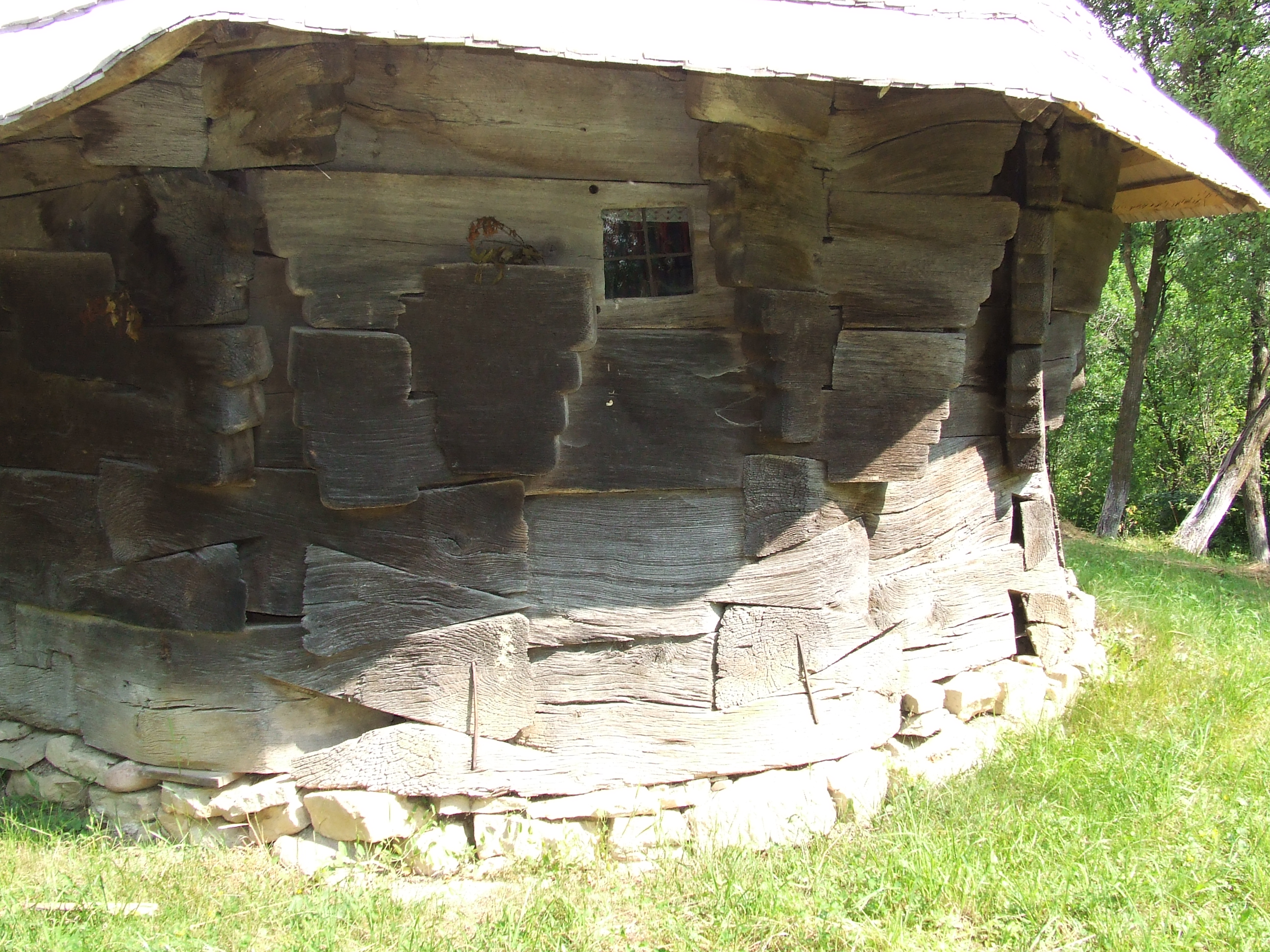
Ornate corner joints on a hexagonal end of a plank church building from 1752 in Sânpaul, Cluj, Romania

- Interlocking saddle notch: Normally seen on D- or full-round profiles, where a notch is cut into the top of one log and the bottom of another; these two logs then interlock, creating a tightly-sealed corner. Also popular in handcrafted, full-scribe log houses.

- Dovetail: Typically seen on square, hewn, or chink-style logs. A dovetail joint is cut on the end of a log, where it would rest in a corner—one to the right and one to the left; this creates a tight, interlocking corner. Handcrafted dovetails can be full dovetail with notch surface slopes in two directions simultaneously, or half dovetail with notch surface slopes in one direction.
- Locked or Tooth-edged joint: Typically seen in square logs. A lock joint is where distinct tooth-like profiles are cut at the end of each log for a tight "locked" fit.
- Butt-and-pass: Unscribed (or milled) logs butt up against each other at the corners without notching
- Saddle notch: Used where two round logs overlap each other near the corners; common with the Swedish cope profile
- Vertical corner post also known as post-and-plank: Typically larger (e.g., 8" x 8") than the wall logs (e.g., 6" x 6"). The wall logs would be "toe nailed" into the corner post.
- Mortise and tenon Joinery: the tenon (tongue) of one log connects to the mortise (hole) of another forming a 90-degree angle to secure the joint.

=== Other methods ===
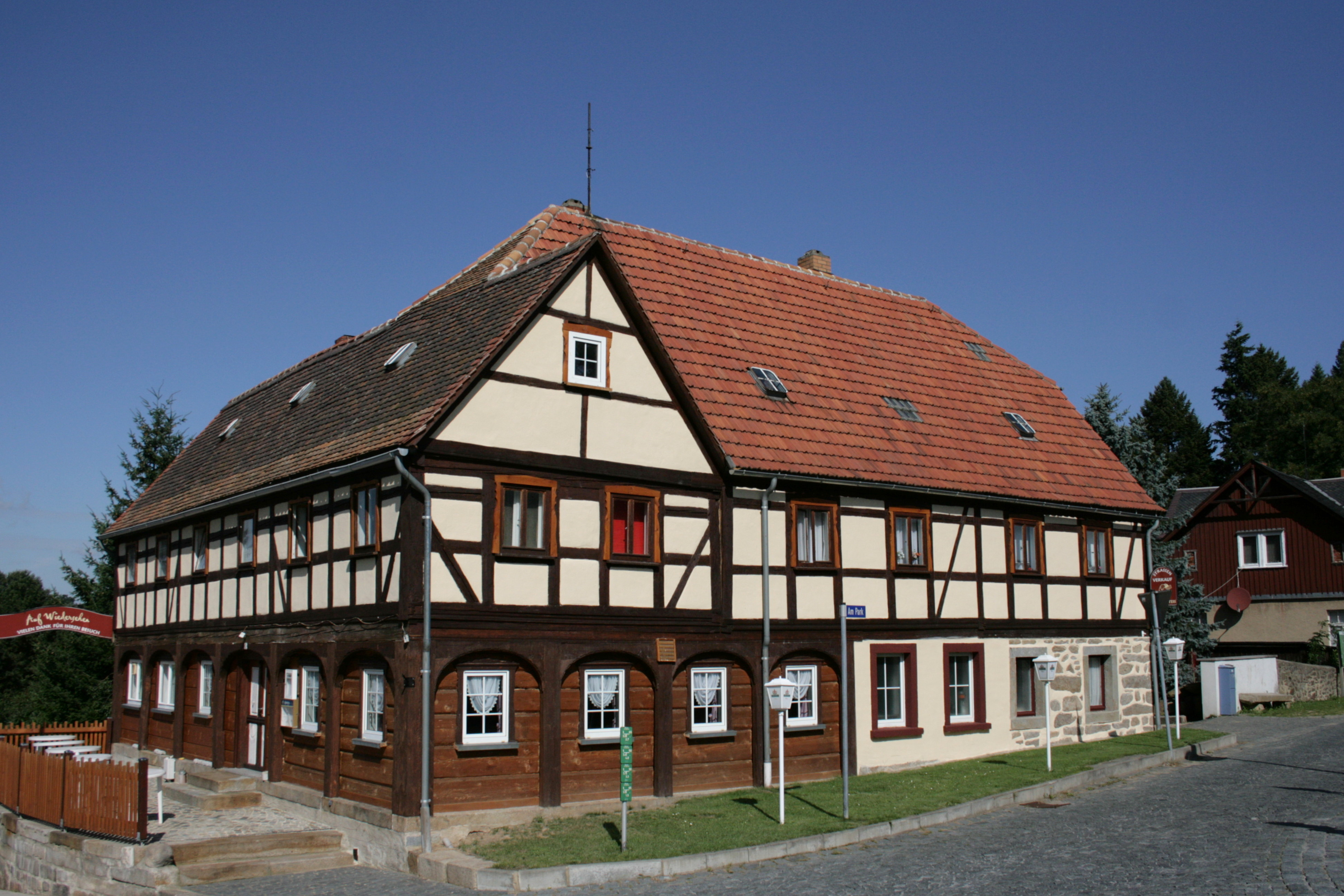
An Umgebinde house in eastern Germany

- Half-Log: The structure is built with conventional building techniques, and "half-log" siding is applied to the exterior and interior walls to replicate the look of full-log construction. Some half-log sidings may also have saddle notch, butt-and-pass, or dovetail corners to give a more realistic appearance.
- Palisade style: The logs are standing on end, and are either pinned or bolted together.
- Pièce en pièce or pièce sur pièce. Similar to post-and-plank above: Uses short logs (e.g. 8' long) lying horizontally between upright posts, resembling post-and-beam construction (but usually lacking the complex notching seen with post-and-beam). Pièce en pièce typically uses a large (8"x 8") vertical corner post. It is important that a vertical component (often 3"x 6") be placed on both sides of each window and door.
- A unique house type in the Oberlausitz region where Germany, Upper Lusatian house or Umgebinde in German. Part of the ground floor has log walls inside the posts of a timber frame.

=== Settling ===
Once fabricated and assembled, the shell of the log house may be disassembled, and the parts may be shipped to the building site. This allows for centralized manufacturing of the house and relatively quick construction on site.

Full-scribe-fit handcrafted log construction is a method of precisely marking where to cut each individual wall log to provide a tight fit between naturally shaped logs along their entire length and in the corners. A high degree of craftsmanship is required for success in this method, and the resulting tight fit of naturally shaped logs has aesthetic appeal.

== See also ==
- Burdei
- Carpathian Wooden Churches
- Engineered wood
- Green building and wood
- Izba
- Kit house
- Lincoln Logs
- Log cabin
- Log home
- Magoffin County Pioneer Village and Museum, Kentucky
- Natural building
- The Hess Homestead
- Timber Frame House
