= List of public art in Madison, Wisconsin =

This is a list of public art in Madison, Wisconsin.

This list applies only to works of public art accessible in an outdoor public space. For example, this does not include artwork visible inside a museum.

Title	Artist	Year	Location/GPS coordinates	Material	Dimensions	Owner	Image
Abraham Lincoln (replica)	Adolph Weinman	1909	Bascom Hill; 43.07532°N 89.40368°W	Bronze	Approx. 90 × 36 × 60 in.	University of Wisconsin–Madison	
ACT	William King	1979	Olbrich Park	Aluminium	H. 26 ft.	Olbrich Botanical Gardens	images here
Alexa	Susan Walsh	1992	Jenifer Street and Williamson Street	Metal, cast iron, industrial enamel, and concrete	15' h × 9.5' w	City of Madison Public Art Collection	images here
Annie C. Stewart Memorial Fountain	Frederick Clasgens	1925	Henry Vilas Zoo; 43.0599°N 89.4086°W	Marble	Approx. H. 9 ft. 4 in. × W. 4 ft.	City of Madison	
Asclepius - Greek God of Healing	Harry Whitehorse	ca. 1960s	1050 E Broadway, Monona, WI 53716	Aluminium	Approx. H. 98 in. × W. 6 ft.		
Awakening	George M. Cramer	1994	Chazen Museum of Art	Bronze	Approx. 72 × 36 × 36 in.	University of Wisconsin–Madison	
Balance Wheel	Robert Gehrke	1998	State of Wisconsin Department of Agriculture, Trade & Consumer Protection building	Steel	12 ft. Diam. × 22 in. D	State of Wisconsin	images here
Blue Lantern on Tripod	Sid Boyum		intersection of Atwood Ave. & Eastwood Drive	painted cast concrete	104 in. H × 31 in. W × 54 in. D	City of Madison Public Art Collection	images here
Blue Urn with Dragon	Sid Boyum		intersection of Atwood Ave. & Jackson St.	painted cast concrete	66 in. H × 30 in. W × 28 in. D	City of Madison Public Art Collection	images here
Bronze Hosta Leaf	Sylvia Beckman		Olbrich Botanical Gardens	bronze		City of Madison Public Art Collection	images here
Bronze Tulip Leaf	Sylvia Beckman		Olbrich Botanical Gardens	bronze		City of Madison Public Art Collection	image here
Camp Randall Memorial Arch	Lew Porter	1912	Randall Ave. at W. Dayton St. 43°4′15.97″N 89°24′33.67″W	Granite	Approx. 36 × 36 × 15 ft.	State of Wisconsin	
Capitol Square Fountains	Sven Schunemann and Heidi Natura	2005	Capitol Square	polished paginated granite, bronze		City of Madison Public Art Collection	
Chinese Fu Dog Lantern	Sid Boyum		Yahara Park and Canal	painted cast concrete	85 in. × 29 in. D	City of Madison Public Art Collection	image here
Christ and the Children	Mary Ann Lohman	1960s	Edgewood Elementary School	Metal	Approx. H. 56 in. × W. 3 ft.	Edgewood E.S.	images here
Community	James J. McFadden, Richard Zillman and Cathy Sheets	2009	Revival Ridge Apartments at the corner of Allied Dr. & Jenewein Rd.	steel		City of Madison Public Art Collection	images here
Creature Abstract Head	Sid Boyum		intersection of Atwood Ave. & Eastwood Dr.	painted cast concrete	47 in. H × 31 in. W × 20 in. D	City of Madison Public Art Collection	images here
Dignified Figure with Tablet	Sid Boyum		Lowell Elementary School Garden	painted cast concrete	94 in. H × 35 in. W × 23 in. D	City of Madison Public Art Collection	image here
Dreamkeepers	Dr. Evermor	2001	211 S. Paterson St.	Scrap metal	30 ft	The Warren family	
Earth Flight	Beth Sahagian	1988	University of Wisconsin Hospital and Clinics	Indiana limestone	Approx. 4 ft. × 10 ft. × 10 ft.	University of Wisconsin Hospital and Clinics	
Easter Island Sculpture	Sid Boyum		Lowell Elementary School Garden	painted cast concrete	67 in. H × 27 in. D	City of Madison Public Art Collection	images here
Faith	Karl Bitter	1912	Wisconsin State Capitol	Granite	Approx. H. 15 ft.	State of Wisconsin	
Fiddleheads	Sylvia Beckman	1988	Olbrich Botanical Gardens	Limestone	Approx. H. 12 ft. × Diam. 5 ft.	Olbrich Botanical Gardens	images here
Forward	Jean Pond Miner Coburn	1895	Wisconsin Historical Society (original), Wisconsin State Capitol (replica); 43.0747°N 89.3858°W	Bronze repousee	Approx. 7 ft. 9 in. × 3 ft. 6 in. × 3 ft. 6 in.	State of Wisconsin	
Four Lakes	Andrea Myklebust and Stanton Gray Sears	2009	Frances Plaza between Frances Street and State Street	granite, bronze		City of Madison Public Art Collection	images here
Freedom of Communication	James Watrous	1971	University of Wisconsin–Madison, Vilas Communication Hall	Tesserae, plywood, epoxy & brass	Approx. 18 ft. × 12 ft. 6 in. × 1 1/2 in.	University of Wisconsin-Madison	
Gateway Project	Edgar Jerome Jeter	1987	1401 S. Park St.	Bronze & fiberglass	Approx. H. 10 ft.		
Generations	Richard Artschwager	1991	Chazen Museum of Art	Steel, granite, concrete, Plexiglas & plants	Approx. H. 32 ft. × W. 60 ft. × L. 155 ft.		
Gyre	Thomas Stancliffe	2007	Wisconsin State Revenue Building	metal			
Hans Christian Heg	Paul Fjelde	1925	Wisconsin State Capitol	Bronze	Approx. 9 ft. 6 in. × 3 ft. × 3 ft.	State of Wisconsin	
Hieroglyph	O.V. Shaffer	1965	Madison Public Library	Copper	Approx. 12 ft. × 66 in. × 55 in.	Madison Public Library	
Interspirit	James Thomas Russell	1983	University of Wisconsin–Madison	Stainless steel	2 parts. Approx. 12 ft. × 6 ft. 9 in. × 1 ft. 10 in.	University of Wisconsin	
Justice	James Watrous	1951	Dane County Courthouse 43°4′17.43″N 89°23′3.42″W	Aluminium	H. 9 ft.	Dane County Courthouse	
Knowledge	Karl Bitter	1912	Wisconsin State Capitol	Granite	Approx. H. 12 ft.	State of Wisconsin	
Learning of the World	Attilio Piccirilli	1917	Wisconsin State Capitol	Granite	H. 8 ft. × W. 40 ft.	State of Wisconsin	
Let the Great Spirit Soar	Harry Whitehorse	1991	2930 Lakeland Ave 43°5′25.26″N 89°20′25.92″W	Celtis wood	Approx. H. 12 ft. × W. 22 in.		
Levitation of the Enchanted Princess	Tony DeLap	1984	121 E. Wilson St.	Steel	Approx. H. 11 ft. × W. 42 ft.		
Liberty Supported by the Law	Karl Bitter	1910	Wisconsin State Capitol	Granite	Approx. H. 8 ft. × W. 40 ft.	State of Wisconsin	
Living for the Dream	Frank Brown	1993	215 Martin Luther King Jr. Blvd.	Bronze & stoneware	Approx. 9 × 8 × 6 ft.	City of Madison	image here
Madison	Christopher Sproat	1987	Madison Federal Courthouse	Aluminum, Lexan, acrylic, cold cathode glass tubing, steel, Plexiglas & neon	Approx. 12 × 61 × 45 ft.	United States General Services Administration	
Maquina	William Conrad Severson	1994	University of Wisconsin–Madison, Engineering Hall	Stainless steel	Approx. H. 18 ft.	University of Wisconsin–Madison	
Mother and Child	William Zorach	1930	Chazen Museum of Art	Bronze	Approx. 65 × 32 × 28 in.	University of Wisconsin–Madison	
Nails' Tales	Donald Lipski	2005	Removed from Camp Randall Stadium	concrete	ca. 20 ft. tall	University of Wisconsin–Madison	
Prosperity and Abundance	Karl Bitter	1912	Wisconsin State Capitol	Granite	Approx. H. 15 ft.	State of Wisconsin	
Robert Kellner Memorial	Caryl Yasko	1984	MacKenzie Environmental Education Center	Concrete	Approx. 5 ft. 10 in. × 13 ft. 2 in. × 8 ft. 4 in.	State of Wisconsin	
Rotational Shift	Andrea Blum	1987	University of Wisconsin–Madison – Computer Science Building	Concrete	Approx. 18 in. × 76 ft. × 120 ft.	University of Wisconsin–Madison	
Spare Time	John Martinson	1979	11 W. Main St. – Rooftop	Steel	Approx. 11 ft. × 49 1/2 in. × 58 in.	City of Madison	image here
Statue of Liberty (replica)	Frédéric Auguste Bartholdi	1950	Warner Park	Metal	Approx. H. 9 ft. × W. 2 1/2 ft.		
Strength	Karl Bitter	1912	Wisconsin State Capitol	Granite	Approx. H. 12 ft.	State of Wisconsin	
The Timeless Current, Seeking a Place of Repose, Quietly Changes	Kathleen Kasper-Noonan	1996	University of Wisconsin Law School	Mixed media	Approx. L. 75 ft.	University of Wisconsin	
TimeKeeper	Robert Curtis	1983	Law Park	Concrete, stainless steel, Cor-Ten steel & granite	Approx. H. 11 × W. 16 × L. 24 ft.		
Untitled	Cliff Garten	1996	University of Wisconsin–Madison, biotechnology & genetics center	Glass & stainless steel			
Untitled	Unknown		5805 Hamersley Rd.	Wood	Approx. H. 18 ft. × W. 4 ft.		
Untitled	Alan Tollakson	1980	Olbrich Botanical Gardens	Indiana limestone	Approx. 26 1/2 in. × 45 in. × 25 in.	Olbrich Botanical Gardens	
Verex Syzygy	O.V. Shaffer	1986	150 E. Gilman St. 43°4′48.66″N 89°23′10.68″W	Stainless steel			
Water Links	Athena Tacha	1997	University of Wisconsin–Madison, Waisman Center	Concrete & evergreens	6 × 30 × 40 ft.	University of Wisconsin–Madison	
Waisman Building Blocks	Steven Woodward	2000	University of Wisconsin–Madison, Waisman Center	Rainbow granite	Three pieces totaling approx. 2 × 16 × 4 ft.	University of Wisconsin–Madison	
William Dempster Hoard	Gutzon Borglum	1922	University of Wisconsin–Madison, College of Agriculture	Bronze		University of Wisconsin–Madison	
Wisconsiana	Lloyd Hamrol	1988	General Executive Facilities Plaza	Granite	Approx. 12 × 84 × 92 ft.	State of Wisconsin	
Wisconsin (also known as Forward)	Daniel Chester French	1914	Wisconsin State Capitol	Bronze	H. 15 ft. 5 in.	State of Wisconsin	
Wisdom, Thought, and Reflection	Adolph Weinman	1917	Wisconsin State Capitol			State of Wisconsin	
Updraft	Michael A. Burns	2016	Brittingham Park, near Main St. and Brittingham Place; 43.0647°N 89.3961°W	Cor-Ten steel	25' high × 30' wide × 30' deep	City of Madison	
