= Homer Fieldhouse =

American landscape architect

Homer David Fieldhouse
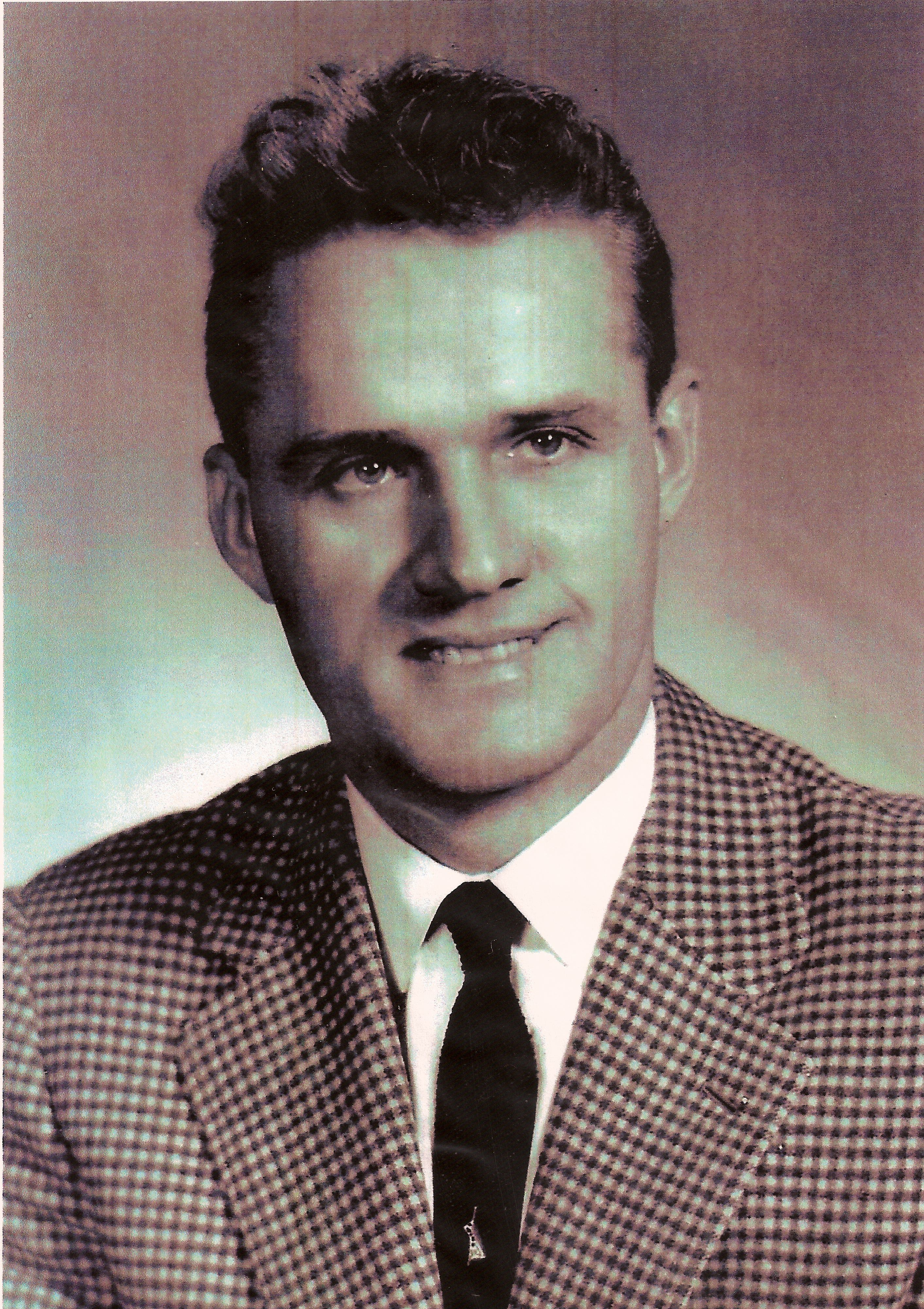
- Born: June 10, 1928; Dodgeville, Wisconsin
- Died: June 30, 2008 (aged 80); Madison, Wisconsin
- Occupation: Landscape Architect
- Spouse: Lynn Sulis Fieldhouse
- Children: Erik and Kurt Fieldhouse
- Parent(s): Claire and Effie Fieldhouse

Homer David Fieldhouse (June 10, 1928 – June 30, 2008) was an American landscape architect who is credited with designing and overseeing the creation of almost 60 golf courses across the Midwest. He was close friends with Alex Jordan, creator of the House on the Rock.

== Youth ==
Homer was born in Dodgeville, Wisconsin to Claire J. Fieldhouse and Effie M. Fieldhouse (née Davies). Claire was in the nursery business and one of his clients was Frank Lloyd Wright's Taliesin Design Studio, located near Spring Green, Wisconsin. Homer spent a summer as a teenager working with his father at Taliesin.

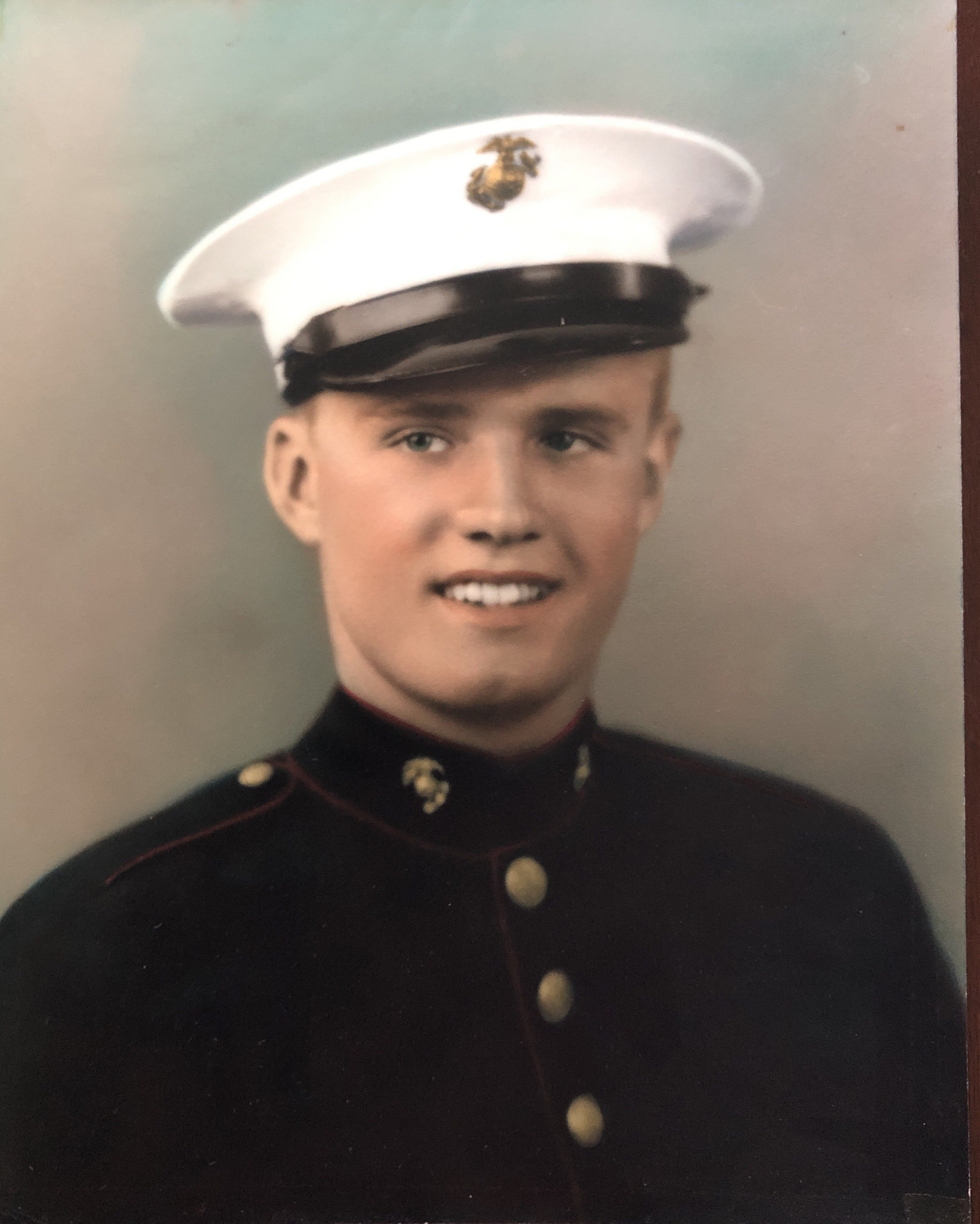
Homer Fieldhouse Marine Corps

After graduating from Dodgeville (WI.) High School in 1946, Homer enlisted in the Marines. He was stationed at Cherry Point, North Carolina as a mechanic, primarily working on F4U Corsairs.

== College ==
After his discharge from the Marines, Homer enrolled in the landscape architecture department at Iowa State College (now Iowa State University), in Ames, Iowa. After three years there, he transferred to the University of Southern California in Los Angeles to study under noted landscape architect, Garrett Eckbo. While in Southern California, he helped with landscaping homes for movie stars such as Greer Garson.

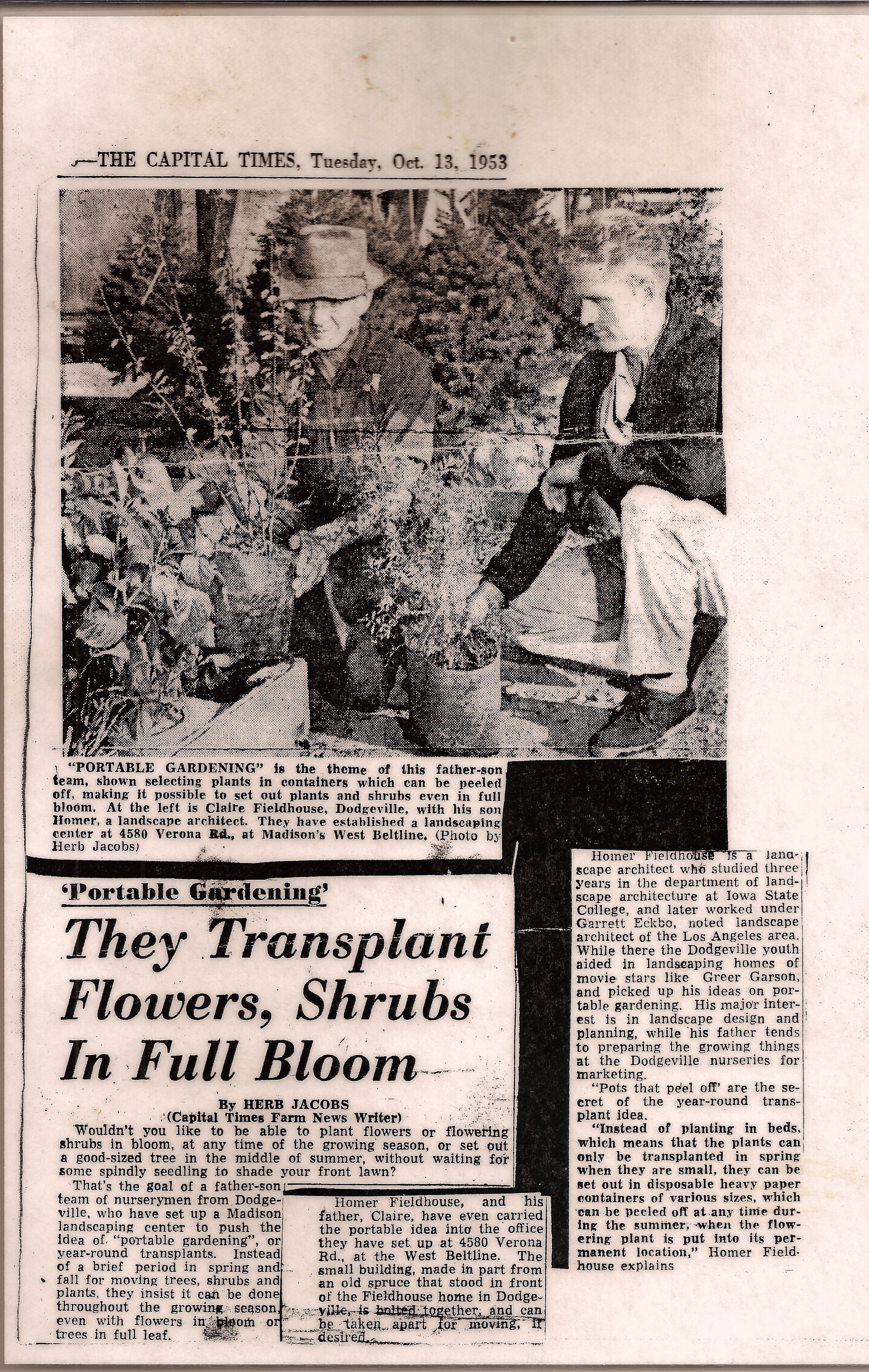
Homer Fieldhouse with his father, Claire, Capital Times, October 13, 1953

== Career ==
In 1953, Homer moved to Madison, Wisconsin to open a nursery business with his father. The father-son team worked together until Claire died in 1957. Throughout the mid- to late-1950s, Homer worked on landscaping projects for a variety of clients, often traveling to California during the winter months to work. Homer and Lynn Sulis married at the Frank Lloyd Wright-designed First Unitarian Society Meeting House on June 28, 1958.

Homer started doing golf course work in the mid-1950s, with the bulk of his golf course work being done between 1961 and 1972. A partial list from this period includes:

Sun Prairie Golf Course, Sun Prairie, WI - Opened 1961
Pigeon Run/Berms at Sheboygan Town & Country Golf Club, Sheboygan, WI - Opened 1962
Braidwood Recreation Club (2nd 9), Braidwood, IL - 1965
Camelot Country Club, Lomira, WI - Opened 1966
Gibson Woods Golf Course, Monmouth, IL - Opened 1966

(course record held by 2004 British Open champion Todd Hamilton.)

Candywood Golf Club, Vienna, OH - 1966
Ponderosa Country Club, Warren, OH - 1966
Eagle Bluff Golf Club, Hurley, WI - Opened 1967
High Cliff Golf Course, - Sherwood, WI - Opened 1968
Valley High Golf Club, - Houston, MN - Built 1968
Coachman’s Golf Resort, Edgerton, WI - Built in 3 stages: 1968, 1970, & 1991
Westhaven Golf Club, Oshkosh, WI - Opened 1969
Sugar Hills Golf Club (2nd 9), Goodland, KS - 1969
Golden Sands Golf Community, Cecil, WI - Opened 1971
Lake Creek Country Club, Storm Lake, IA - Opened 1972

(Homer's "absolute favorite")

Hillcrest Golf & Country Club (2nd 9), Yankton, SD - Built 1972

In the mid- to late-1950s, Homer befriended Alex Jordan, creator of the House on the Rock. Homer, Alex, friend Edgar Hellum, Homer's brother Roger and members of Roger's work crew traveled to New York in March 1964 to landscape the Wisconsin Pavilion exhibit at the 1964-65 New York World's Fair. Homer had been hired by Wisconsin's Lieutenant Governor, Jack Olson, to do the outdoor landscaping and to construct an indoor waterfall.

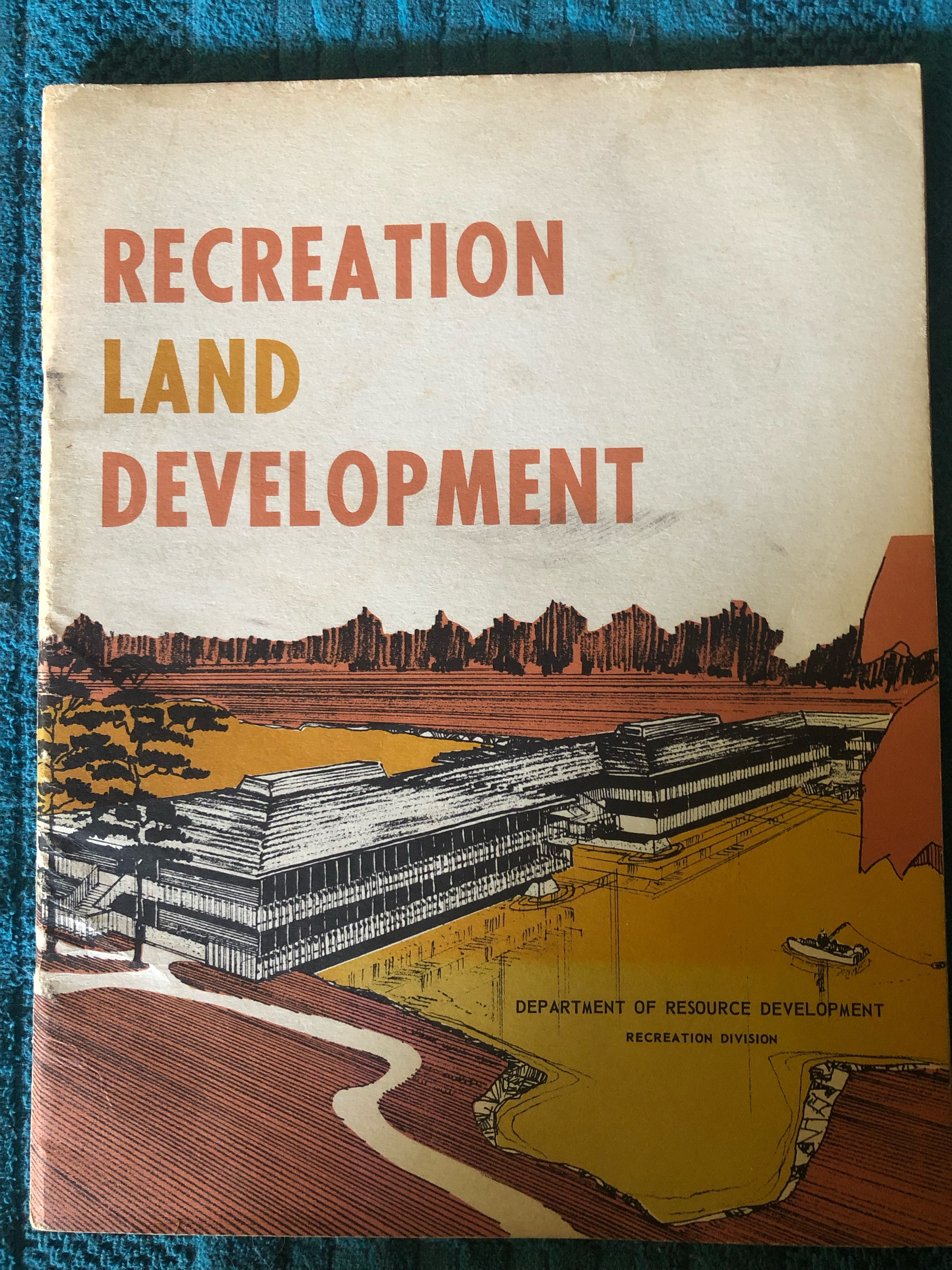
State of Wisconsin Recreation Land Development Department of Resource Development Recreation Department 1967

In 1967, Homer helped prepare a book, Recreation Land Development, for the State of Wisconsin Department of Resource Development. "The information and materials contained in this report were supplied for the most part by Homer Fieldhouse Associates under contract to the Department of Natural Resources ..."

In the 1980s, Homer was able to establish contact and exchange correspondence with possible relative Admiral Sir John Fieldhouse (later Baron Fieldhouse).

Throughout his career, Homer was also known for his creative deck and patio designs.

Homer's last 18-hole golf course was Lake Breeze Golf Club in Winneconne, Wisconsin, which opened in 1991. Overall, Homer's last golf course project was CNC Links in Newton, Wisconsin, which opened in 2008.

With the help of his son, Architect's Assistant/Presentation Model Craftsman Erik Fieldhouse, Homer was able to stay active in the profession through his final years. He died at age 80 in Madison in 2008.

== Selected golf course projects ==
- Camelot Country Club - Lomira, WI
- Coachman's Golf Resort - Edgerton WI
- Gibson Woods Golf Course - Monmouth, IL
- High Cliff Golf Course - Sherwood, WI
- Idlewild Golf Course - Sturgeon Bay, WI
- Lake Breeze Golf Club - Winneconne, WI
- Lake Creek Country Club - Storm Lake, IA
- Rock River Hills Golf Club (1st 9) - Horicon, WI
- Valley High Country Club - Houston, MN
- Westhaven Golf Club - Oshkosh, WI

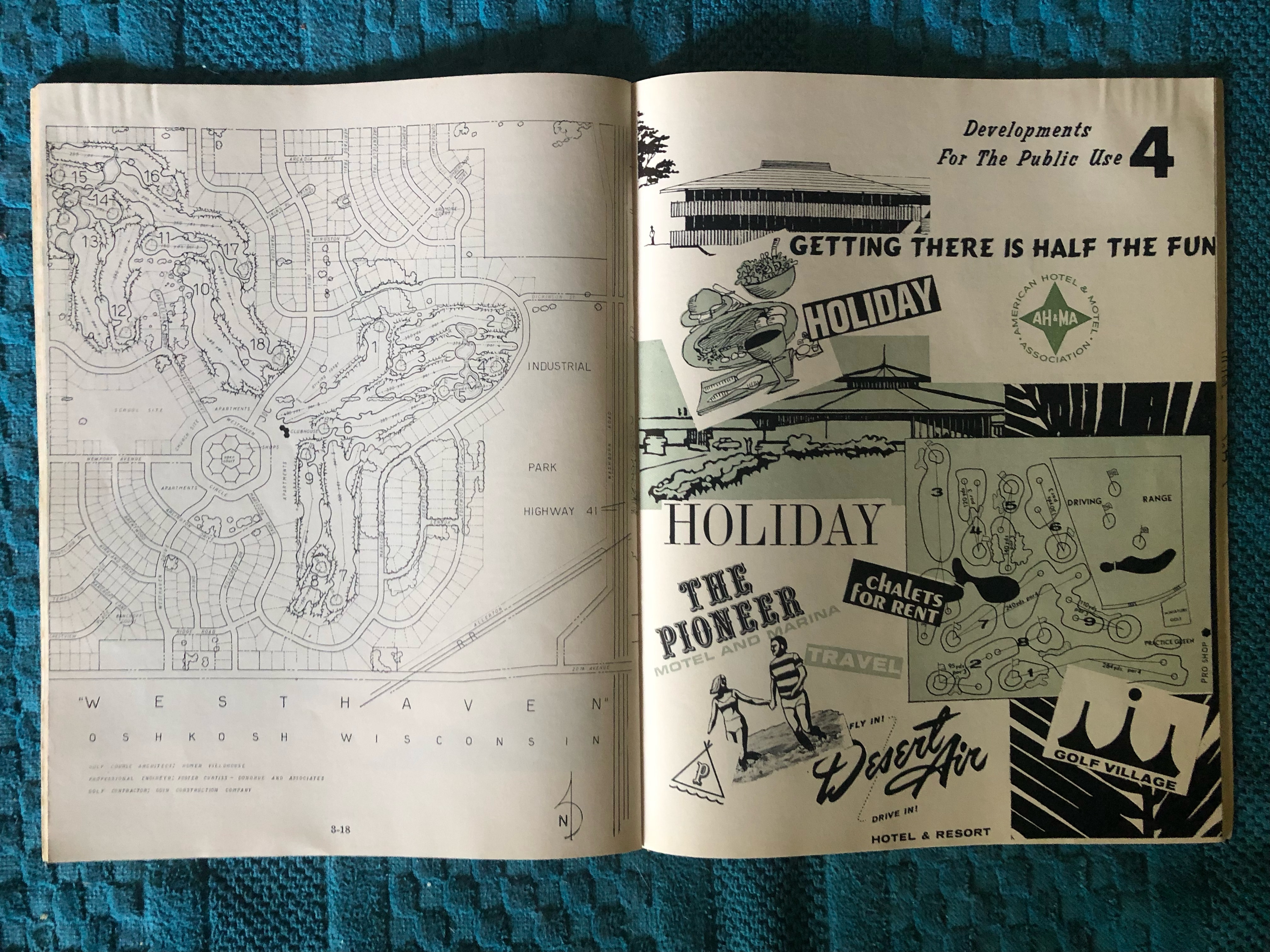
Westhaven development design, Oashkosh Wisconsin, 1967

== Expert witness ==
- "Tripoli Golf Club" vs Milwaukee County Highway Commission
- "Leathem Smith Lodge" vs Wisconsin Highway Commission
- "Odebolt Golf Club" vs Iowa Highway Commission
- La Verne Olson vs Wisconsin Highway Commission ("Lake Breeze Golf Club")
- "Waunakee Golf Club" vs Northwestern Railroad
