= Boyum =

Boyum is a surname. Notable people with the surname include:

- Sid Boyum (1914–1991), American industrial photographer, sculptor, and graphic artist
- Steve Boyum (born 1952), American stunt performer, television director, and film director
