= Annie C. Stewart Memorial Fountain =

Memorial sculpture in Madison, Wisconsin

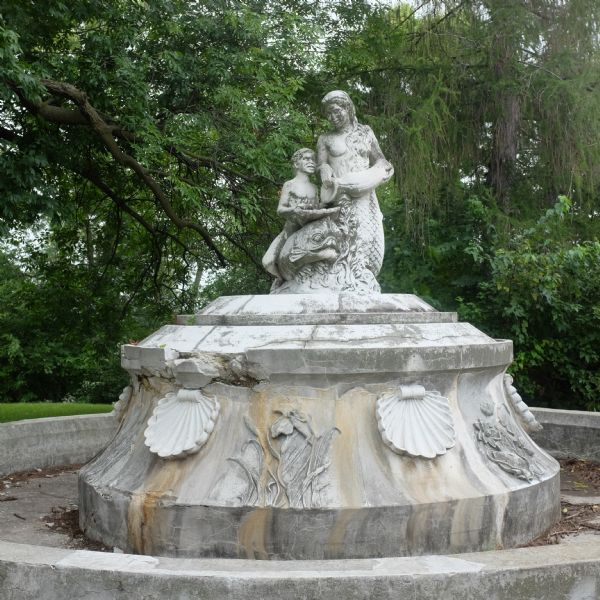
- c. 2014, Close-up condition of the fountain
- Artist: Frederick J. Clasgens
- Year: 1925
- Medium: White Italian Carrara Marble
- Dimensions: 470 cm × 120 cm (184 in × 48 in); 370 cm diameter (146 in)
- Condition: Deteriorating
- Location: Madison, Wisconsin
- 43.0599°N 89.4086°W
- Owner: City of Madison
- Website: www.cityofmadison.com/parks/projects/annie-c-stewart-fountain-conservation-preservation-plan

The Annie C. Stewart Memorial Fountain is a fountain in Madison, the capital of the U.S. state of Wisconsin. Dedicated to the memory of Annie (Anna) C. Stewart (17 January 1867 – 8 April 1905), who engaged in charitable activities in Madison, it was constructed in 1917–1925 and erected in Henry Vilas Park in 1925. The fountain is located south of 625 Wingra Street, near the corner of Wingra Street and Erin Street (the former pedestrian entrance of Henry Vilas Zoo) in Vilas Park. The fountain is adjacent to an eagle effigy mound built by Native Americans overlooking Lake Wingra.

== Biography ==
Annie Stewart was born in Baraboo, Wisconsin, to Frank and Mary Stewart on 17 January 1867. In 1870, her father, Frank Stewart, was appointed Clerk of the United States District Court and the family moved to Madison, Wisconsin. Throughout her life, Annie was active in local Madison charities and was a founding member and a former president of Attic Angels, an organization created in 1889 to provide children's clothing for local families in need.

== Death ==
Stewart experienced major depressive disorder and, during the spring of 1905, she spent a few weeks at the Battle Creek Sanitarium for help with her depression. On the evening of 7 April 1905, Annie was playing cards with her mother and aunt. According to newspaper reports, later that night, after the rest of her family had retired, she stepped out of the house and wandered over a mile away from her home ending up in her neighbor's yard.

The morning of 8 April 1905, Annie's mother and aunt discovered her missing and alerted authorities. Annie was found that afternoon in their neighbor's cistern by 16-year-olds Stephan Gilman and Frederic Brandenburg. During the community search for her that morning, Gilman and Brandenburg discovered the heavy 3-inch-thick (76 mm) wooden cover of the cistern had been moved, presumably by Annie, and found her body inside. Gilman stated he learned from the maid at the Stewart home that she had heard faint sounds of singing around 03:00 the morning of her disappearance but decided that it was only the telephone wires. The cistern was situated directly behind their neighbor Haugen's house and which was only a few feet from the back door. The cistern was 8 feet (2.4 m) deep containing only 3 feet (0.91 m) of water. Annie's death was ruled a suicide by drowning.

== Memorial fountain ==
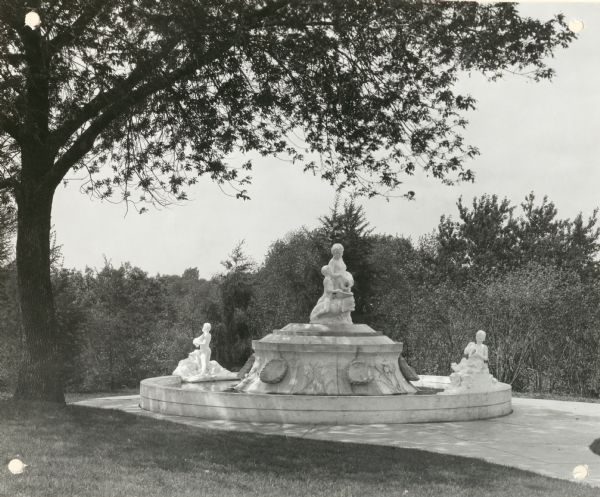
Early photo of Annie Stewart Fountain (circa 1926) courtesy of the Wisconsin Historical Society

Mary C. Stewart died on 21 November 1905, a few months after Annie. Mary bequeathed a gift of US$2,000 (equivalent to US$69,993 in 2024) to the Madison Park & Pleasure Drive Association to commission a drinking fountain in memory of her only child, Annie. The gift was to be used to construct a drinking fountain and in the will it stipulated that Annie's name was to be visibly inscribed on the fountain and that it be erected at an appropriate place in Madison in memory of her daughter. In 1911, while working with the Madison Park & Pleasure Drive Association, John Nolen advised the board of directors to place the fountain in front of a proposed structure on the highest point of a parcel of land recently purchased with a gift from Mrs. Henry Vilas. The location for the fountain suggested by John Nolen offered a commanding view to the south and west and was intended to be the center of interest in Henry Vilas Park. Mr. Nolen felt that this location was appropriate due to the Stewart and Vilas families being close acquaintances. Like the Stewart family, the Vilas family had also lost their son, Henry (28 May 1872 – 2 July 1899).

A committee created by the Madison Park and Pleasure Drive Association, commissioned Frederick J. Clasgens (1879 – 7 April 1955) of Cincinnati, Ohio, for his fountain design after looking at the plans from multiple other proposals. Work on the sculpture began in 1917. The fountain was constructed by Mr. T. C. McCarthy under the direction of Clasgens. The fountain was divided into separate smaller projects to be then be assembled when it was all done.

The fountain has a circular basin made of white concrete with a diameter of 12 feet (3.7 m). In the center of the basin on a raised pedestal are dolphins and sea nymphs. Small tritons on the edges of the circular basin emptied water from their conch shells into smaller basins containing drinking fountains. The figures in the center were cut from white marble by Clasgens and his team. Work on the fountain was completed in late 1924 and was assembled in early 1925. The Annie C. Stewart Memorial Fountain was unveiled that spring.

== Damage and current condition ==
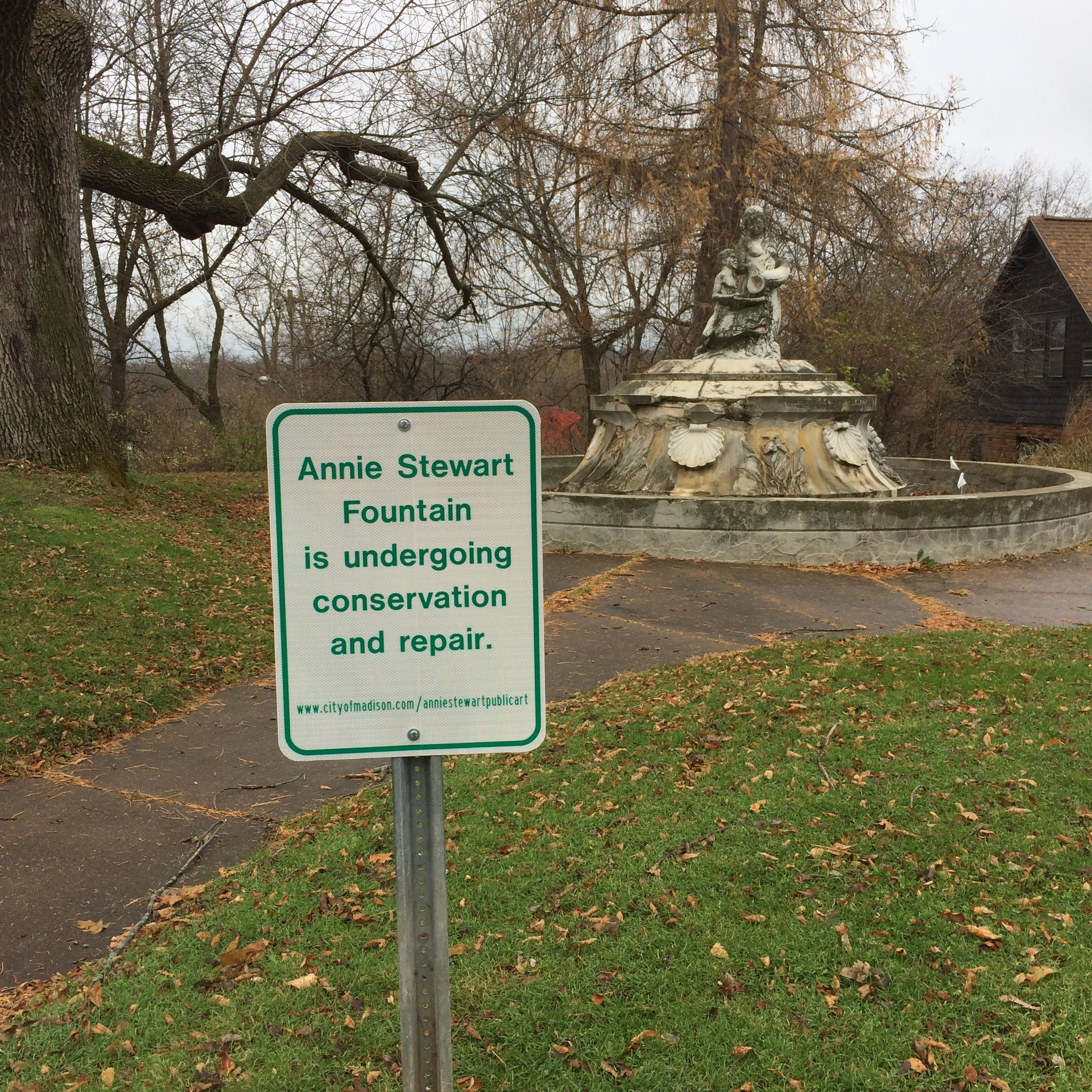
c. 2016, Current condition of the fountain

In the summer of 1931, two boys seriously damaged and broke off one of the triton's arms with a hammer. Another group of boys destroyed the same triton in 1943. The one remaining triton was moved from the fountain for safekeeping and is currently missing. Time and weather have continued to deteriorate the fountain and the sculptures.

Members of the neighborhood and the City of Madison are currently working to restore the fountain as a non-water feature to be enjoyed by everyone who visits Vilas Park and Henry Vilas Zoo.

== See also ==
List of public art in Madison, Wisconsin
