= Sid Boyum =

Boyum in an undated photo

Sidney Edward Boyum (1914 – February 22, 1991) was an industrial photographer, sculptor and graphic artist in Madison, Wisconsin, United States. Much of his work falls into the category of outsider art. Boyum is best known for his public sculptures scattered throughout the Schenk-Atwood-Starkweather-Yahara Neighborhood on Madison's east side.

== Background and history ==
Sid Boyum was born in Duluth in 1914, and lived most of his life in Madison. After graduation from high school in the early 1930s, Boyum worked in the art department of the Brock Engraving Company in Madison for 11 years. He then worked as an industrial photographer for the Gisholt Machinery Company in Madison for 31 years, and also periodically worked on Air Force command manuals for the government. In 1973, he retired so he could work on his many art projects.

Each year from 1963 to 1989, The Wisconsin State Journal commissioned Boyum to draw a different full-page, poster commemorating the opening of the Wisconsin fishing season. After his father's death, his son Steve Boyum donated 60 of his father's sculptures to the City of Madison, reportedly the largest single art gift the city had ever received.

In 2017, a group of neighbors of Boyum, purchased his house and property, which had been abandoned, for back taxes owed in the amount of $28,000. The Friends of Sid Boyum organization performed some minor repairs on the house, and then it was put on the market. As of 2019, his house had been sold, with 29 sculptures remaining in the backyard. The Friends of Sid Boyum has found locations for approximately half of the sculptures to be displayed, and "a few will remain at the house". Karin Wolf, Madison Arts Program administrator, opined that Boyum's offbeat works were "comic, little middle fingers to the status quo", and his works "offer us a relief from the tedium of the absurd times we live in".

Boyum was a close friend, collaborator and influence on other Wisconsin artists and collectors, including Baraboo's Tom Every (A.K.A. "Doctor Evermor"), creator of the Forevertron and Alex Jordan, Jr creator of the House on the Rock. During his lifetime, Boyum also produced thousands of photographs (including a number of whimsical self-portraits), 16-millimeter films, drawings, paintings and bas-relief works.

== Gallery ==
I've been interested in art all my life. Evidence of past civilizations is found in the art they've (artists) left behind. Artists are the real historians. People drew pictures long before they knew the alphabet or studied math and algebra.

— Sid Boyum
