= Applefest (Bayfield, Wisconsin) =

American fall harvest festival

Bayfield Applefest
- Frequency: Annual
- Locations: Bayfield, Wisconsin, United States
- Years active: 63–64
- Attendance: 60,000 (estimated)
- Website: Official website

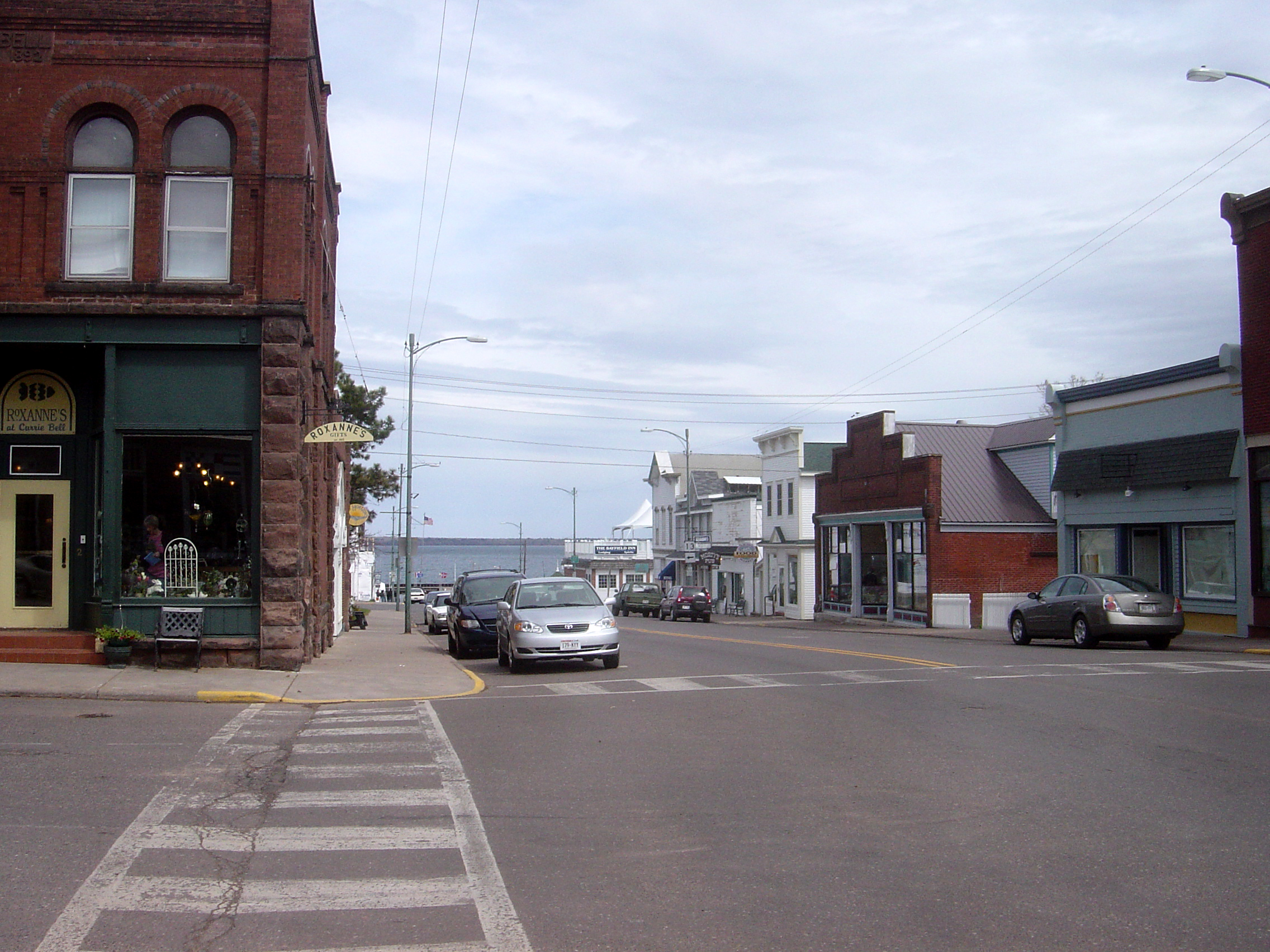
Downtown Bayfield

The Bayfield Applefest is a fall harvest festival held in October, in Bayfield, Wisconsin. Founded in 1962, it has become a destination for many people from across the Midwest, with an annual attendance of approximately 60,000 people.

The festival is a celebration of Bayfield's local heritage, especially showcasing products from the many local apple orchards and wineries. The festival offers a variety of events and attractions. The street festival features over 60 booths, offering fresh foods and local crafts. Other attractions include tours of the 14 local orchards, live music, and an amusement park.

== History ==
In the early 1960s, Jim Erickson, the owner of an orchard in Bayfield, was traveling to North Dakota to deliver a shipment of apples. While in Duluth, his truck had a flat tire. While waiting for a spare to be driven up from home, many people stopped to ask about buying his fruit. After selling bushels of apples to 25 people, he started wondering why he (and other Bayfield apple growers) were traveling so far to sell their goods. Realizing an opportunity, a discussion was raised about selling the local orchard's products more locally, and the idea of Applefest was born. The attendance of the first event in 1962 was 5,000. Over they years, Applefest has continued to experience huge growth in attendance.

No Applefest was planned in 2020 as officials cited the COVID-19 pandemic as cause for cancellation. The 59th was deferred to 2021, when it resumes.

== In popular culture ==
- Honored as the “Best Festival in Wisconsin” by Wisconsin Trails Magazine
- Listed as one of the “10 Best Specialty Food Festivals in the Nation” by USA Today
- The craft-brewed AppleFest Ale is a popular drink produced by the local South Shore Brewery, and is seasonally available in the fall.

== See also ==
- List of festivals in the United States
