= Ashland Brewing Company =

Former brewery in Wisconsin

- Industry: Alcoholic beverage
- Founded: 1874
- Headquarters: Ashland, Wisconsin; United States
- Products: Beer
- Owner: Muehler & Goeltz, later by Frederick W. Miller

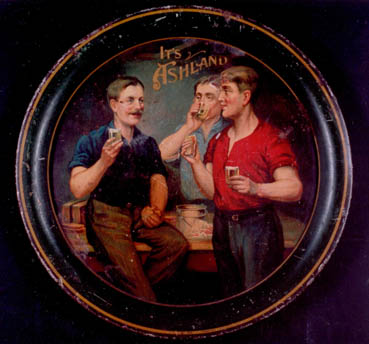
An old metal serving tray, advertising Ashland Beer.

The Ashland Brewing Company was a small regional brewery, located in the northern Wisconsin city of Ashland. It was founded in 1874 and had an annual capacity of over 12,500 barrels.

== Ashland Union Brewery ==
The name of the company's facility was the Ashland Union Brewery, and was located on 10th Avenue East, on a plot of land next to Bay City Creek. This was near the site of another beverage business, known as the Ashland Bottling Works.

The brewery measured 34 by 70 feet and was two stories high. Initially built of wood, the building was later veneered with bricks on the outside. Next to the brewery was a 24 by 50 foot ice house, due to the unavailability of modern refrigeration at the time.

The brewery was owned by brothers Adam and Conrad Goeltz, who emigrated to the US from Germany in 1847. They first moved to Ashland in 1854, subsequently leaving but returning in 1863. The brewery was later owned by Frederick W. Miller, from 1901 to 1937.

In addition to owning the brewery, the Goeltz family also owned the Seventh Avenue Hotel, as well as an Ice cream parlor on Seventh Avenue West (which is now known as Chapple Avenue).

== Products ==
Beer was made available in both glass bottles, as well as kegs. Shipment was available, and the company delivered to all points around Lake Superior, according to an article about the brewery that appeared in the August 8, 1874 edition of the Ashland Press.

Some of the products included their flagship brand Ashland Beer, as well as White Ribbon Beer, and New York State Porter and Ale. Advertisements for each of these appeared locally and regionally.

The company's logo was a six-pointed star, inside of a circle, with the letter A (for Ashland) inside of the star. The star was known as the Brewer's Star, which was intended to symbolize purity. The six points of the star represented the six aspects of brewing most critical to purity: the water, the hops, the grain, the malt, the yeast, and the brewer.

== Prohibition ==
During Prohibition, the company produced non-alcoholic beverages, such as soft drinks. Despite surviving the Prohibition era (which ended in 1933), the brewery eventually closed in 1937.

Despite closing after prohibition, the company remains a part of Wisconsin's brewing history. While a few other historic beer brands from Northern Wisconsin survived and still exist, such as Rhinelander Beer, Ashland Beer unfortunately remains just a memory.

== See also ==
- South Shore Brewery of Ashland, founded in 1995
- List of breweries in Wisconsin
- Beer in the United States
- List of defunct breweries in the United States
