= South Shore Brewery =

Brewery in Ashland, Wisconsin

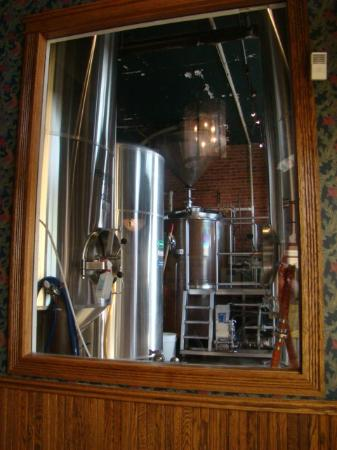
- South Shore Brewery, located inside the Deepwater Grille brewpub
- Industry: Alcoholic beverage
- Founded: 1995; 31 years ago
- Headquarters: Ashland, Wisconsin; United States
- Products: Beer (in bottles, cans, and kegs)
- Website: southshorebrewery.com

South Shore Brewery is a regional craft brewery in Ashland, Wisconsin. It was founded in 1995 and owned by brewmaster Bo Bélanger. The brewery was the seventh licensed microbrewery in the state of Wisconsin, and became northern Wisconsin's first modern micro-brewery. South Shore produces an assortment of beers, many of which are seasonal.

The brewery has a small production facility in a local brewpub, the Deepwater Grille, where its specialty and seasonal beers are produced, and all of the brewery's beverages are available on tap. A second location was opened in nearby Washburn, Wisconsin in 2016, that serves as the main production brewery, with a tasting room and retail outlet.

As of 2016, South Shore beer is available for sale in 60 counties, in three states.

== Products ==
The company's flagship beer is Nut Brown Ale, a medium-colored ale, with low bitterness, similar to an English Mild ale.

In 2008, the brewery gained notability within the Local Food Movement when it began using locally produced barley, and regional hops.

=== Year-round beers ===
- Nut Brown Ale
- Inland Sea Pilsener
- Rhoades' Scholar Stout
- Northern Lights Cream Ale
- WPA Wisconsin Pale Ale

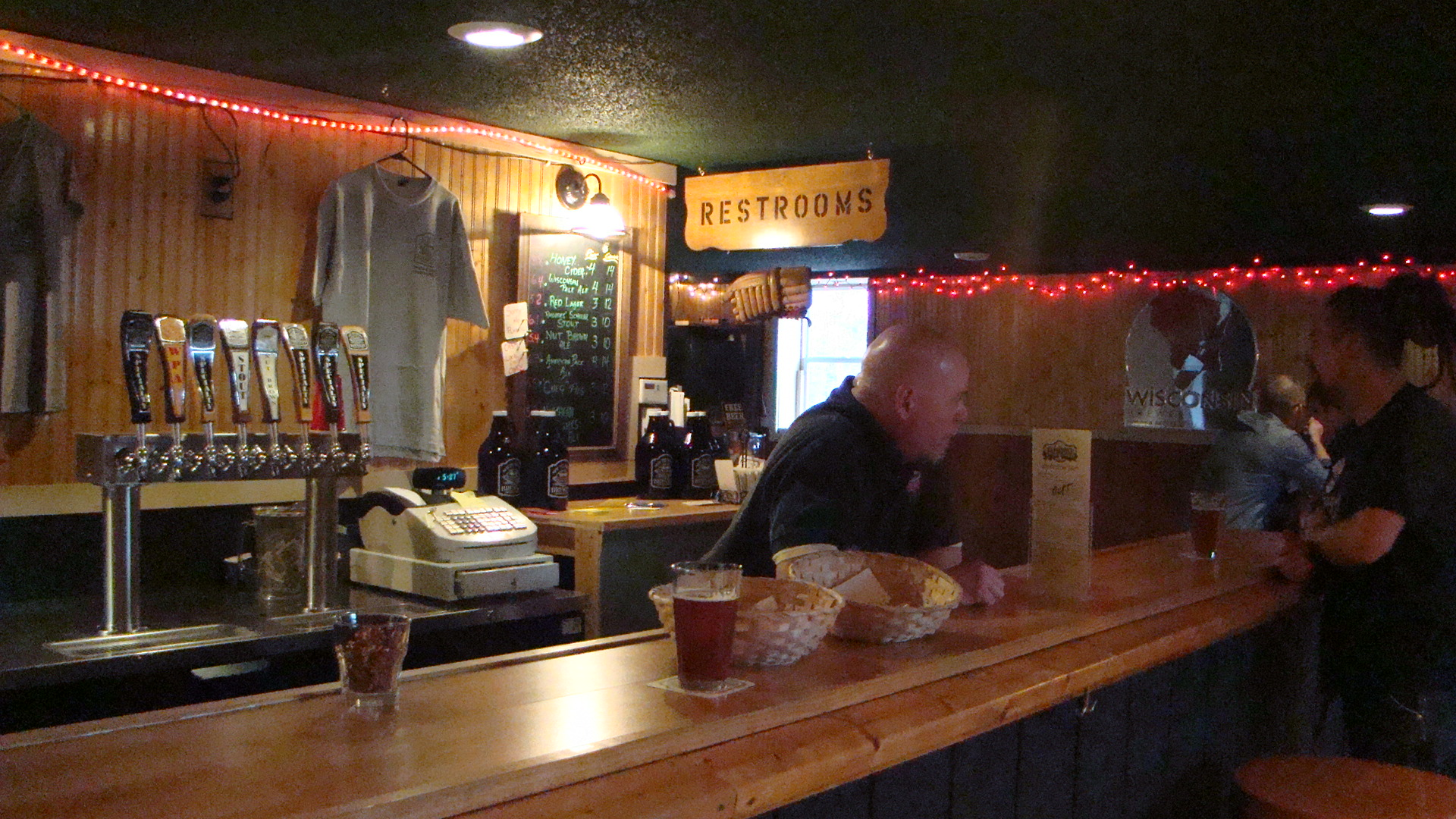
The Brewery's tasting room, in Washburn

=== Seasonal beers ===
- AppleFest Ale
- Bavarian Wheat
- Maple Amber
- Coffee Mint Stout
- Bourbon Barrel Coffee Mint Stout
- Honey Double Maibock
- Children of the Gourd pumpkin ale
- Willie's Alloa Strong Scotch Ale
- Sacred Cow Irish Stout
- Diesel Bear blonde honey ale
- Krampusnacht dark IPA
- Meliora Flanders style red sour ale
- Ice Caves IPA
- Cheq Pils
- Oktoberfest

== See also ==
- Ashland Brewing Company, also of Ashland, WI
- List of breweries in Wisconsin
- Beer in the United States
