= House on the Rock =

Museum in Iowa County, Wisconsin, US

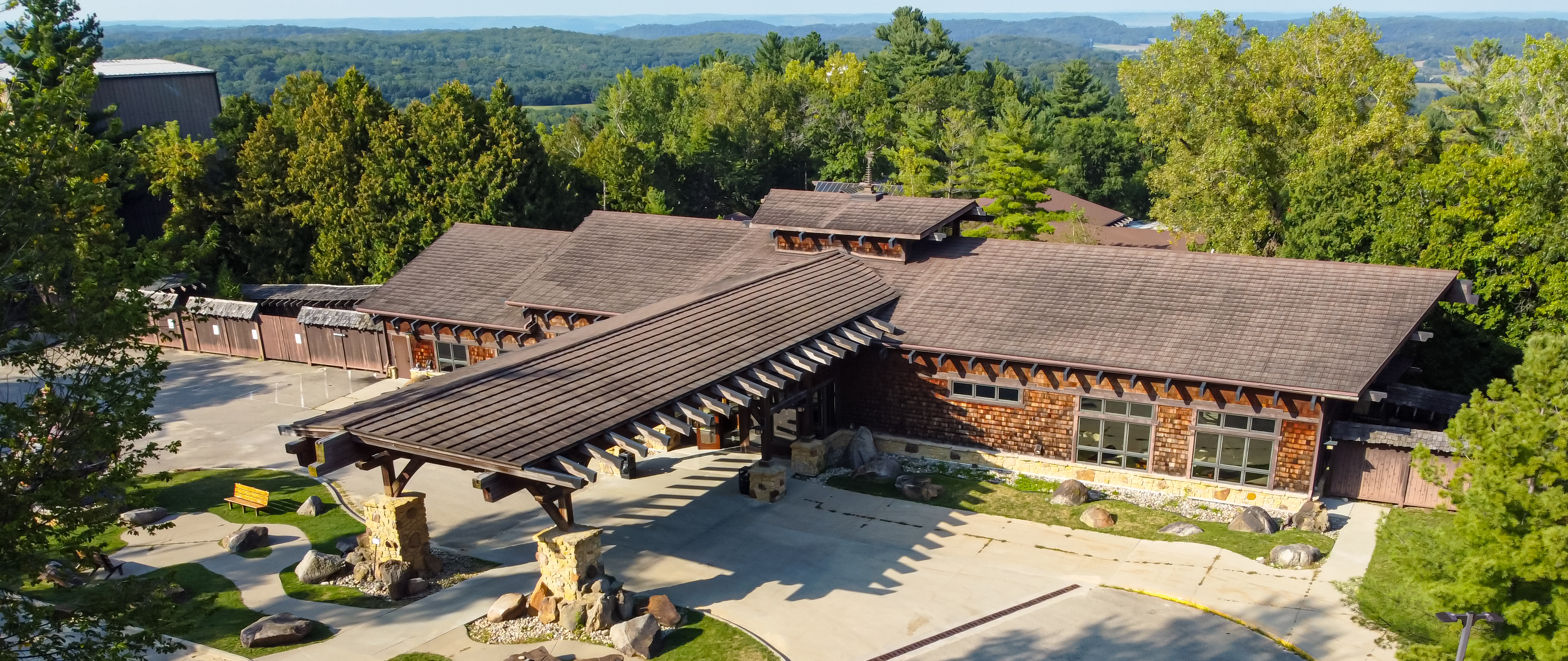
- Welcome Center

- Location within Wisconsin Location within the United States

General information
- Architectural style: Modernism
- Location: Spring Green, Wisconsin, U.S.
- Coordinates: 43°06′00″N 90°08′10″W
- Construction started: 1945
- Completed: 1959

Design and construction
- Architect: Alex Jordan Jr.

Website
- www.thehouseontherock.com

The House on the Rock is a tourist attraction near Spring Green, Wisconsin. Opened in 1959, it is a complex of architecturally distinct rooms, streets, gardens, and shops designed by Alex Jordan Jr.

== History ==
Both of Jordan's biographers (Marv Balousek and Doug Moe) relate a story told by Sid Boyum, which according to Balousek may have been embellished. Boyum's account places the inspiration for the house in a meeting between Alex Jordan Jr. and Frank Lloyd Wright. According to Boyum, at some unspecified time between 1914 and 1923, Jordan Sr. supposedly drove with Boyum to Taliesin to show Wright the plans for a building, the Villa Maria in Madison. Boyum claimed that Jordan had hoped for Wright's approval, but that Wright reportedly looked at the plans and told Jordan: "I wouldn't hire you to design a cheese crate or a chicken coop. You're not capable." Fuming, on the drive back on Highway 23, Jordan pointed to a spire of rock and told Boyum: "I'm going to put up a Japanese house on one of those pinnacle rocks and advertise it". Balousek says Wright "apparently didn't forget the incident", noting that Wright "complained publicly to Iowa County officials about the house the Jordans were building" and bought a nearby piece of property, "perhaps as a way to get back at Jordan".

The House on the Rock's website disputes the legitimacy of Boyum's story, refuting his claims on a page titled "Wikipedia is wrong! There is no connection between Alex Jordan and Frank Lloyd Wright":

- Frank Riley, not Alex Sr., designed the Villa Maria, which was built in 1923.
- Wright was in his 50s, while Sid Boyum and Alex Jordan Jr. were both children at the time.
- Wright was likely not in Wisconsin at the time; he mostly stayed in Japan between 1916 and 1922, while designing the Imperial Hotel.

The legitimacy of this story is also questioned in the biography of Alex Jordan written by Tom Kupsh. Kupsh's book lists many of the same reasons as The House on the Rock website and also states that "The first agreement (an extended lease) with the Christianson family, who owned Deer Shelter Rock, was made some 30 years later in 1953 and no sign appeared at the road entrance until The House on the Rock opened to the public in 1960."

=== Timeline ===
- c. 1920 – Alex Jordan Sr. allegedly vows to "put up a Japanese house on one of those pinnacle rocks" to spite Frank Lloyd Wright. According to the official House on the Rock website, this is a story created by Jordan's friend, Sid Boyum, to build promotion for the House on the Rock.
- c. 1945 – Alex Jordan Jr. began blasting to form a level foundation at the top of the pinnacle. He talked to the farmer who owned the rock but did not bother to secure formal rights at the time. The first structure on the rock was a simple "tent" (Moe) or a "picnic place with a tarpaper roof".
- 1952 – An electric hoist was installed to aid construction.
- 1959 – Labor Day: Jordan placed a stone marker on Highway 23 and officially opened the house to paying visitors.
- 1961 – The "Gate House" was built.
- 1962 – Wisconsin Trails magazine published a long article about the house by Howard Mead. The article marked the status of the house as a serious tourist attraction, and drew regional attention to it. The state Industrial Commission gave the house its first formal inspection.
- 1968 – The "Mill House" opened, containing "one of the world's largest" fireplaces. It is the first room in the house to emphasize collections of curiosities and antiques, including dolls, guns, and mechanical musical instruments.
- 1971 – The "Streets of Yesterday" opened, influenced by techniques devised by Paul Yank for a 1968 "Streets of Old Milwaukee" exhibit at the Milwaukee Public Museum.
- 1974 – The "Music of Yesterday" opened.
- 1978 – The "Red Room" opened.
- 1981 – The "Organ Room", Carousel Building, and "World's Largest Carousel" opened, on Easter weekend.
- 1985 – The "Infinity Room" was constructed.
- 1990 – The "Heritage of the Sea" opened.
- 1991 – The "Octopus' Garden" was added to the Heritage of the Sea. "The Blue Danube" debuted at the House, along with the House On The Rock Carriage Collection, which would add still more nostalgia to the Transportation Building.
- 2008 – Two additional buildings; the Welcome Center and the Alex Jordan Jr. Center (a museum detailing Mr. Jordan's personal life and the construction of the complex's many buildings) were constructed.

== Layout and attractions ==
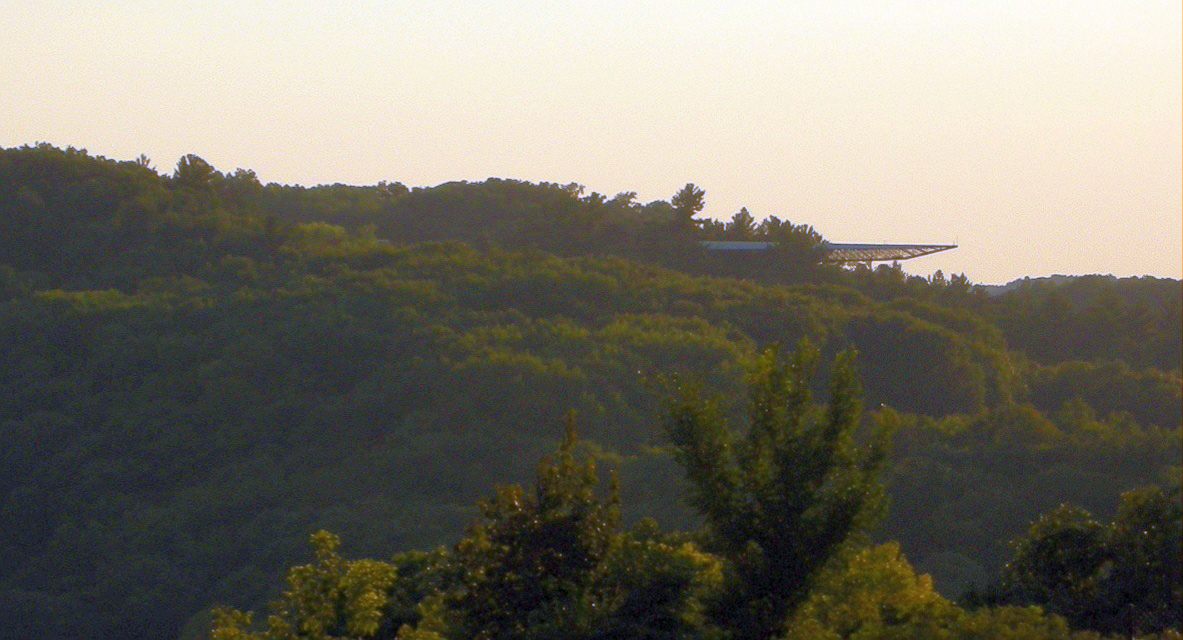
The House's "Infinity Room" is visible from an overlook off Highway 23, almost a mile (1.6 km) away.

The "house" itself is atop Deer Shelter Rock, a column of rock approximately 60 by 70 feet (18 by 21 m), by 200 feet (61 m) on the top, which stands in a forest nearby. Additions were made to the original structure and other buildings added over the course of several decades. The complex now features "The Streets of Yesterday", a re-creation of an early twentieth century American town; "The Heritage of the Sea", featuring nautical exhibits and a 200-foot model (61 m) of a fanciful whale-like sea creature battling a Kraken; "The Music of Yesterday", a huge collection of automatic music machines; and what the management bills as "the world's largest indoor carousel", among other attractions. The carousel at the House on the Rock features 269 carousel animals, 182 chandeliers, over 20,000 lights, and hundreds of mannequin angels hanging from the ceiling. The carousel, built in 1981, has no horses and cannot be ridden by visitors. During the winter, the attraction features a Christmas theme, with decorations and a large collection of Santa Claus figures. Many of the bathrooms are decorated with strange objects, including mannequins, flowers, and preserved animals.

The earlier structures, namely the House on the Rock itself, the Gate House, and the Mill House, are reminiscent of the work of Frank Lloyd Wright, though much less coherently designed than is characteristic of Wright, given its patchwork of external structures and interior spaces. According to a likely apocryphal story, the building actually began partly to spite the master architect, who ran his Taliesin communal school near Spring Green. These early structures feature exposed stone, low ceilings, dark woodwork, and antiques on display.

Jordan sold the house in 1988 to a friend who continued building on the site, adding to the collections of knick-knacks and exhibits featuring authentic pieces, reproductions, and specially-made examples of everything. The most recent addition is the "Alex Jordan Jr Center", a museum detailing Mr. Jordan's personal life and the construction of the complex's many buildings. In the same year, the Wisconsin State Journal published a four-part series on "The House on the Rock", which reporter Marv Balousek later expanded into a self-published book entitled House of Alex. According to Balousek, Jordan Sr. hired "drunks and bums" from the Madison streets to help blast the rock. Balousek says that according to Sid Boyum these workers were sometimes paid with whiskey and sometimes by check, but that Alex Jordan Jr. destroyed the cancelled checks later to further a myth that he had personally built the house himself.

Jane Smiley wrote this about the complex in 1993:

Though most people outside of the Midwest have never heard of it, the House on the Rock is said to draw more visitors every year than any other spot in Wisconsin. Also in the Wyoming Valley, but on top of a huge monolith, the House on the Rock reveals the spirit of its builder, Alex Jordan Jr., to be as single-minded and eccentric as Wright's, but in substance almost absurdly opposed. ... And it is hard not to be overwhelmed by the House on the Rock. The sheer abundance of objects is impressive, and the warmth most of the objects exude, the way that the toys ask to be played with, for example, makes the displays inherently inviting. But almost from the beginning, it is too much. The house itself is dusty. Windowpanes are cracked. Books are water damaged. The collections seem disordered, not curated. In fact, there is no effort to explore the objects as cultural artifacts, or to use them to educate the passing hordes. If there were informative cards, it would be impossible to read them in the dark. Everything is simply massed together, and Alex Jordan comes to seem like the manifestation of pure American acquisitiveness, and acquisitiveness of a strangely boyish kind, as if he had finalized all his desires in childhood and never grown into any others.

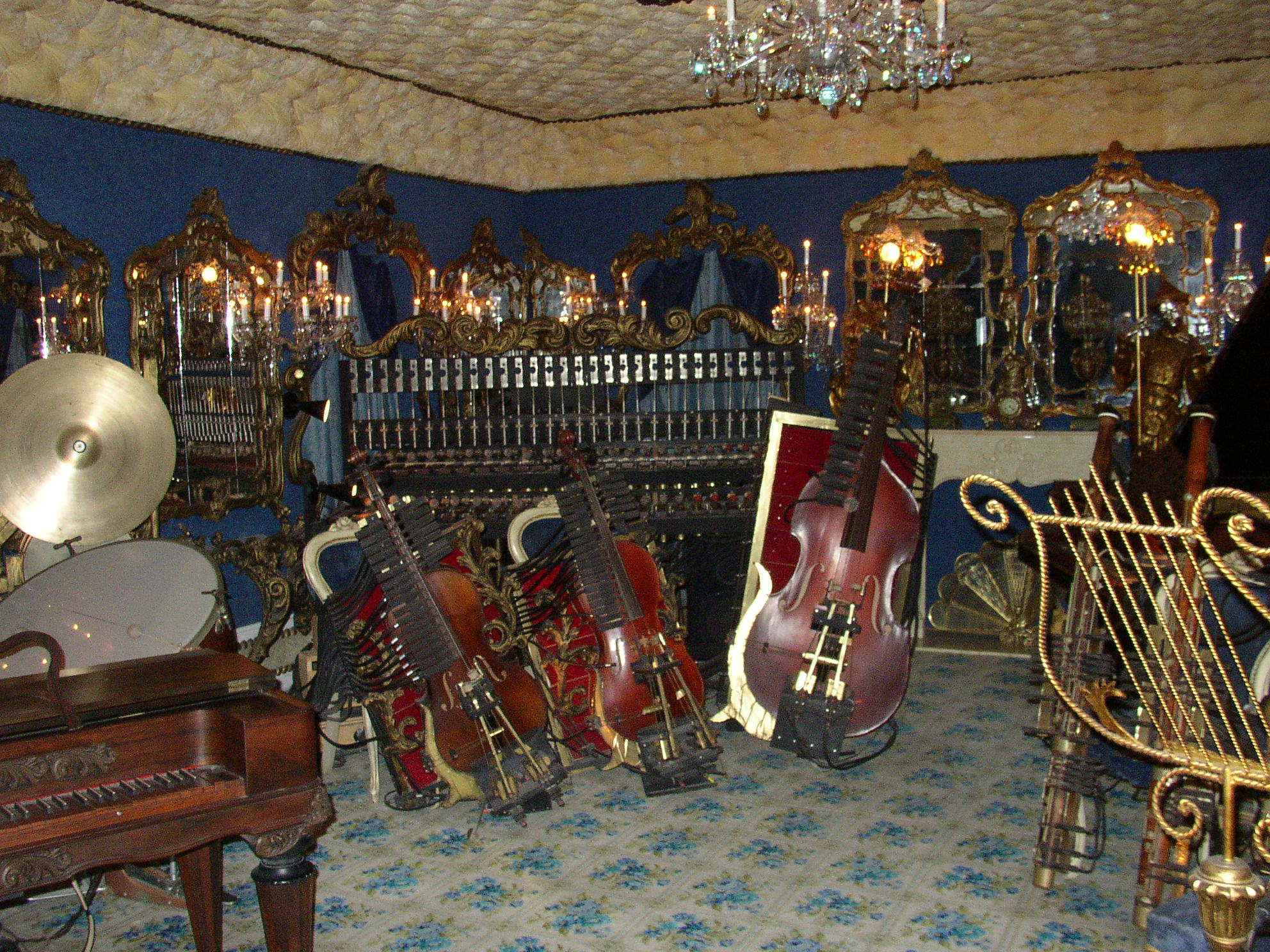
Automated musical instruments are operated by inserting tokens; some instruments play, while others are synthesized.

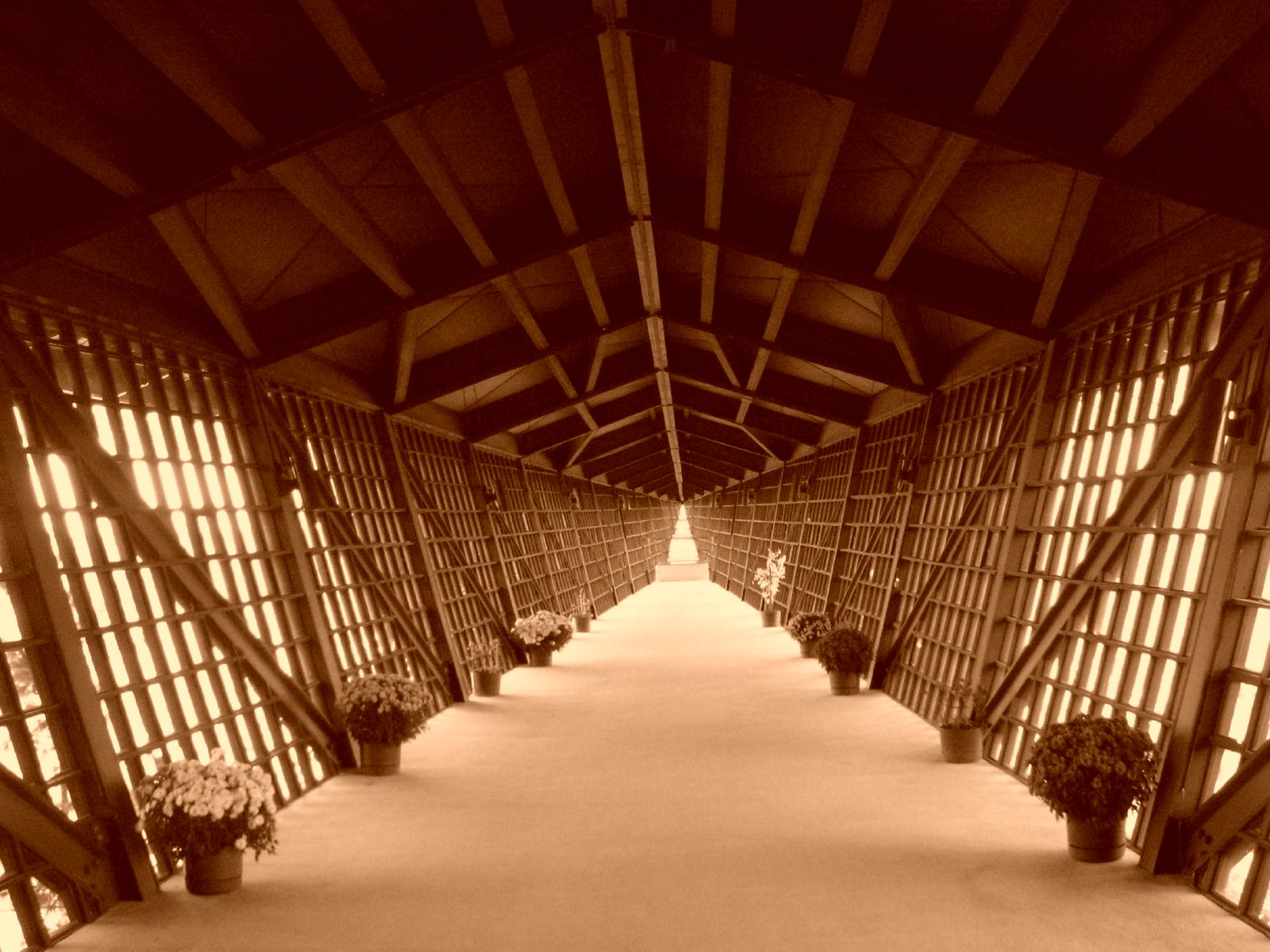
The Infinity Room juts out 218 feet (66 m) from the original House on the Rock, without supports underneath. The room has over 3,000 windows.

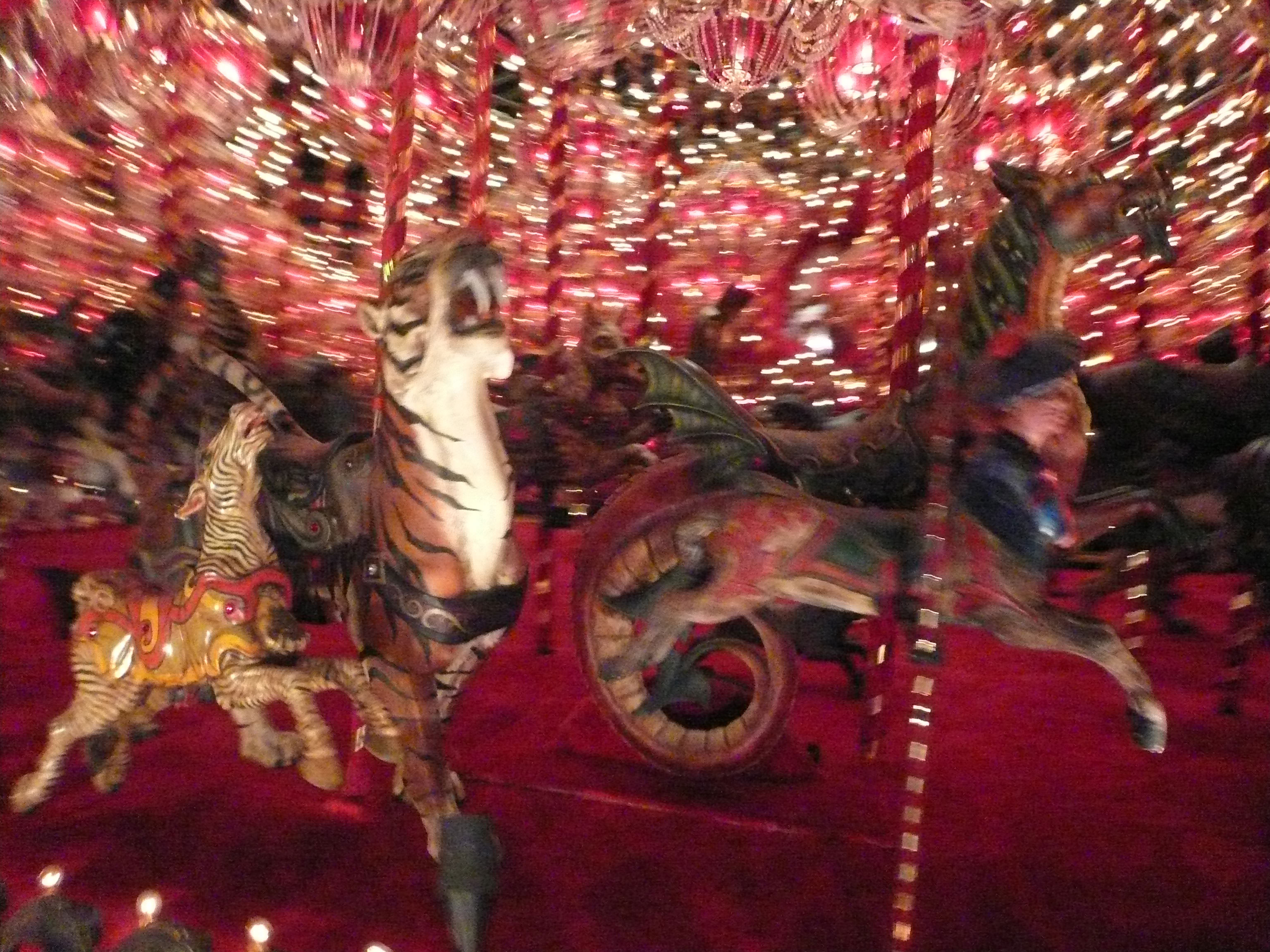
The House on the Rock Carousel

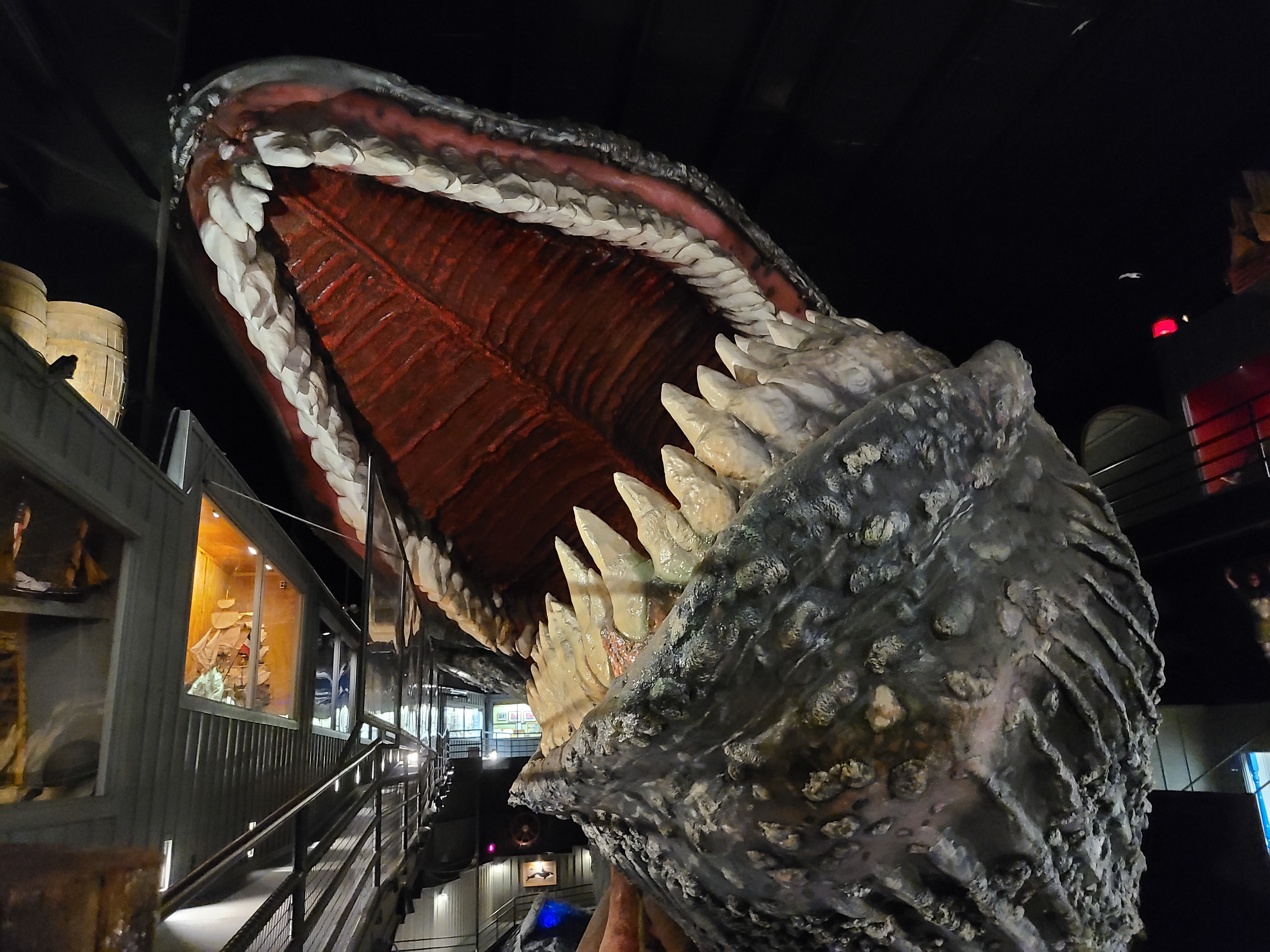
Heritage of the Sea exhibit

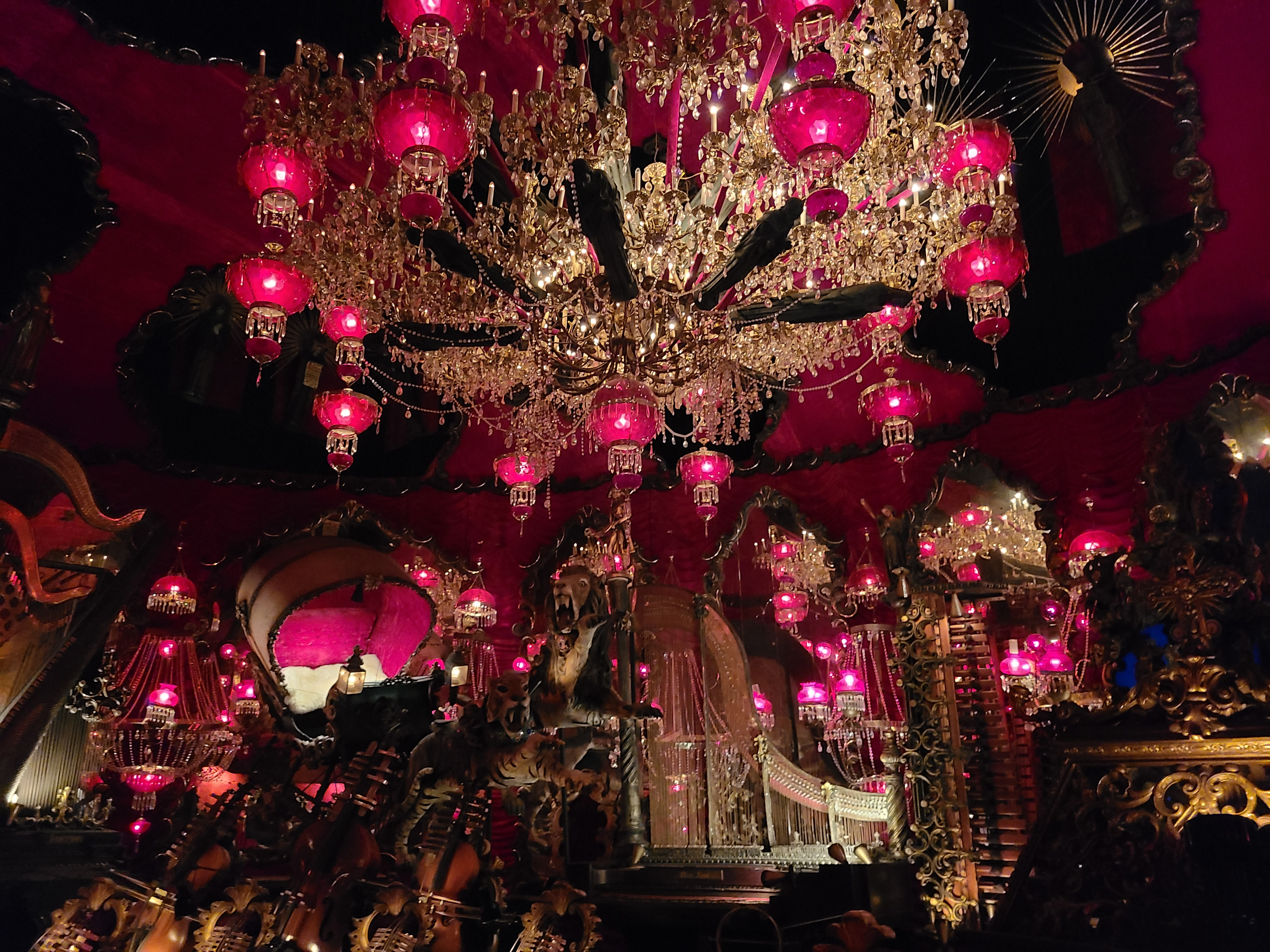
Red Room exhibit

The House has inspired several authors and musical groups, the most prominent being author Neil Gaiman, who used it as an important plot point in his 2001 novel American Gods, along with the related 2017 television series. The 2017 film American Fable features parts of the house, including the carousel and Infinity Room, in a dream sequence.

The 1997 10,000 Maniacs music video for "More Than This" was filmed at the House. The 2019 Raconteurs music video for "Somedays (I Don't Feel Like Trying)" was also filmed there.

A nearby resort, called the House on the Rock Resort, is affiliated with the House on the Rock campus. During the 2004 United States presidential election, Democratic presidential candidate John Kerry rented out a large portion of the resort for his debate preparation.

== Authenticity ==
Some of the apparent antiques in the House on the Rock are real, but many are not what they seem: depending on one's point of view one could call them fakes, replicas, or original and imaginative creations in the style of antiques. Moe's authorized biography suggests that the question of authenticity is not a problem, presenting it this way:

While the Regina Sublima music box is a real antique, as are many other pieces and exhibits at the House, everyone knows that other pieces are re-creations designed and built on the House property. It's part of the fun—guessing what's real at the House and what is the magic of imagination and re-creation.

Much of the House's contents were built by Jordan and his associates. Balousek quotes Jordan associate Bob Searles as saying

We were creating entertainment. We were not making a historically accurate representation. There was never any need to worry about historical accuracy. We were creating a fun place.

The "Phelps Car" in the Streets of Yesterday, for example, was made by Jordan associate Bob Searles from an old carriage and some motorcycle parts. Balousek quotes Searles as saying "We could fabricate any antiques we wanted to—that was the fun of it. It was just one guy's great big sandbox, where he kept building stuff." Balousek says that Jordan sometimes bought bonafide antiques, but "usually preferred a good copy that cost less," and quotes a supplier as saying "I suspect that Jordan would pay more for a good copy than he would for an original, because he could sit in a corner and laugh about the way he fooled everyone."

In 1978, a disgruntled employee complained to the state Justice Department of consumer fraud, saying that these claims were tall tales. The "Tiffany" lamps, for example, were made by the Illinois firm of Bauer and Coble. The name of the Tusk of Ranchipoor was actually a pun on the name of Richard Rahn, a Mazomanie antiques dealer, who had built many of the fakes: "Rahn is poor." Jordan was enjoined from making false claims, the brochure was rewritten, and misleading signs were removed from the exhibit. However, the exhibits retained their colorful names, allowing visitors to surmise what they wished.

The room-sized assemblages of what appear to be mechanical musical instruments are partly illusion. Some of the instruments actually play, but the strings and woodwinds in particular do not; their sound is actually produced by organ pipes, while the moving instruments fool visitors.

Today, the nature of the exhibits is disclosed, though perhaps not emphasized, by the management; for example, the current website notes, "All the armor featured in this elaborate collection was made for The House on the Rock". This was not always the case. According to Balousek, before 1978 brochures advertised authentic Tiffany lamps, said the Gladiator Calliope dated from 1895, that the Franz Josef music machine had actually belonged to the Austrian emperor, that the Tusk of Ranchipoor was genuine ivory carved by an "unknown Punjab artisan," and so forth.

The official 1993 brochure says that the house "boasts the largest collection of Bauer and Coble lamps in the world. The management considers them finer and expects them to be more valuable than Tiffany's," and boasts that "The 'Four Seasons' panels are thought to be the only exact replica of the original and very popular Tiffany effort."

== Works cited ==
- Balousek, Marv (1990). House of Alex: A true story of architecture and art; greed, deception and blackmail. Oregon, WI: Waubesa Press. ISBN 1-878569-06-6.
- Moe, Doug (1991). Alex Jordan: architect of his own dream. Spring Green, WI: House of Wyoming Valley. ISBN 0-9630207-0-6.
