= Forevertron =

Scrap metal sculpture in Wisconsin

Coordinates: 43°21′50″N 89°46′18″W

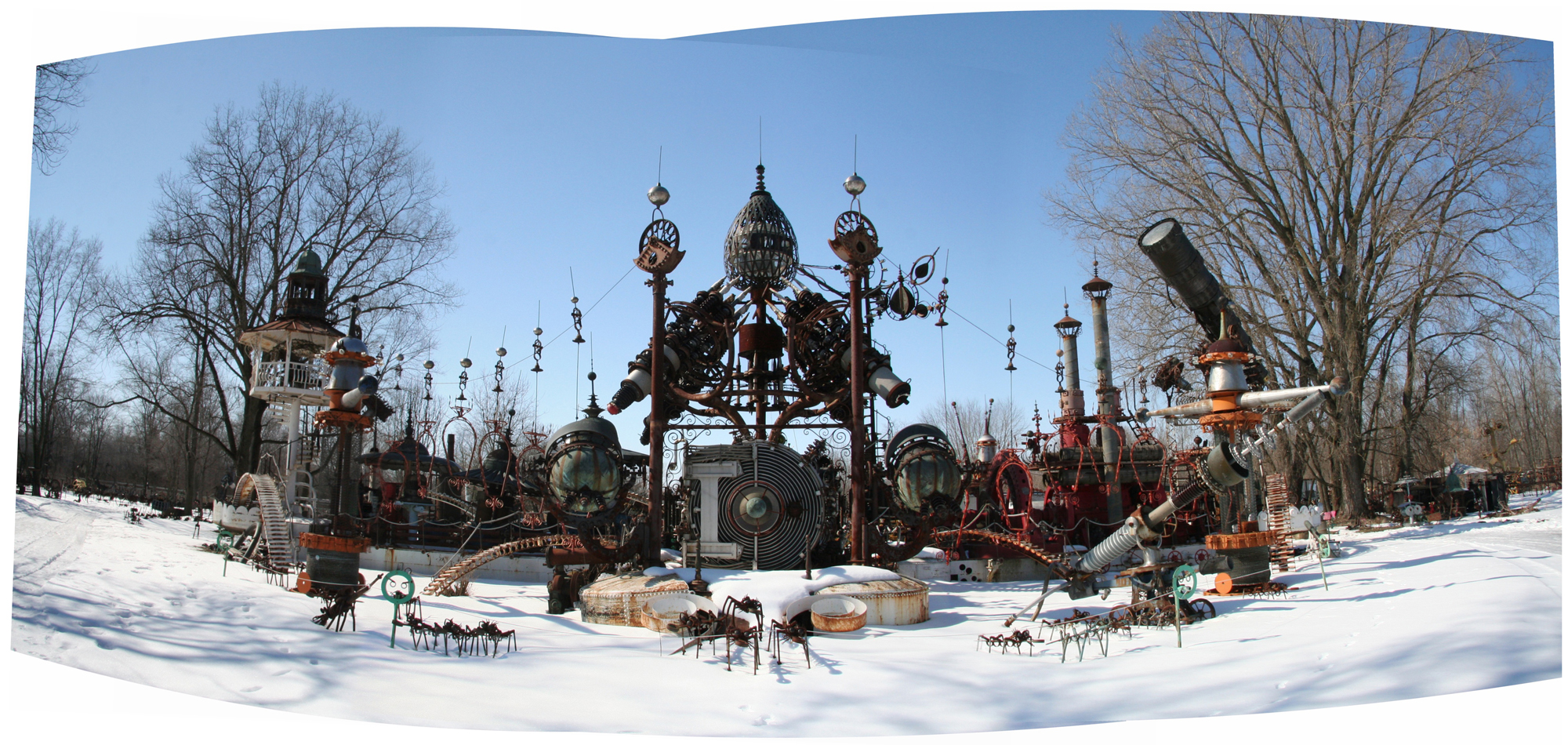
Panoramic of Dr. Evermor's Forevertron

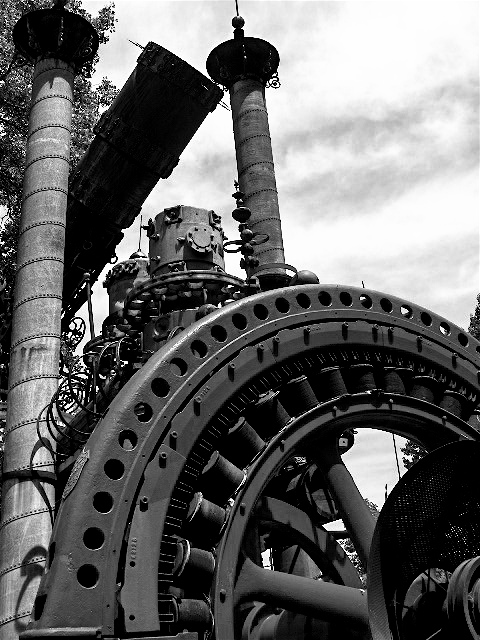
Forevertron's Power Source

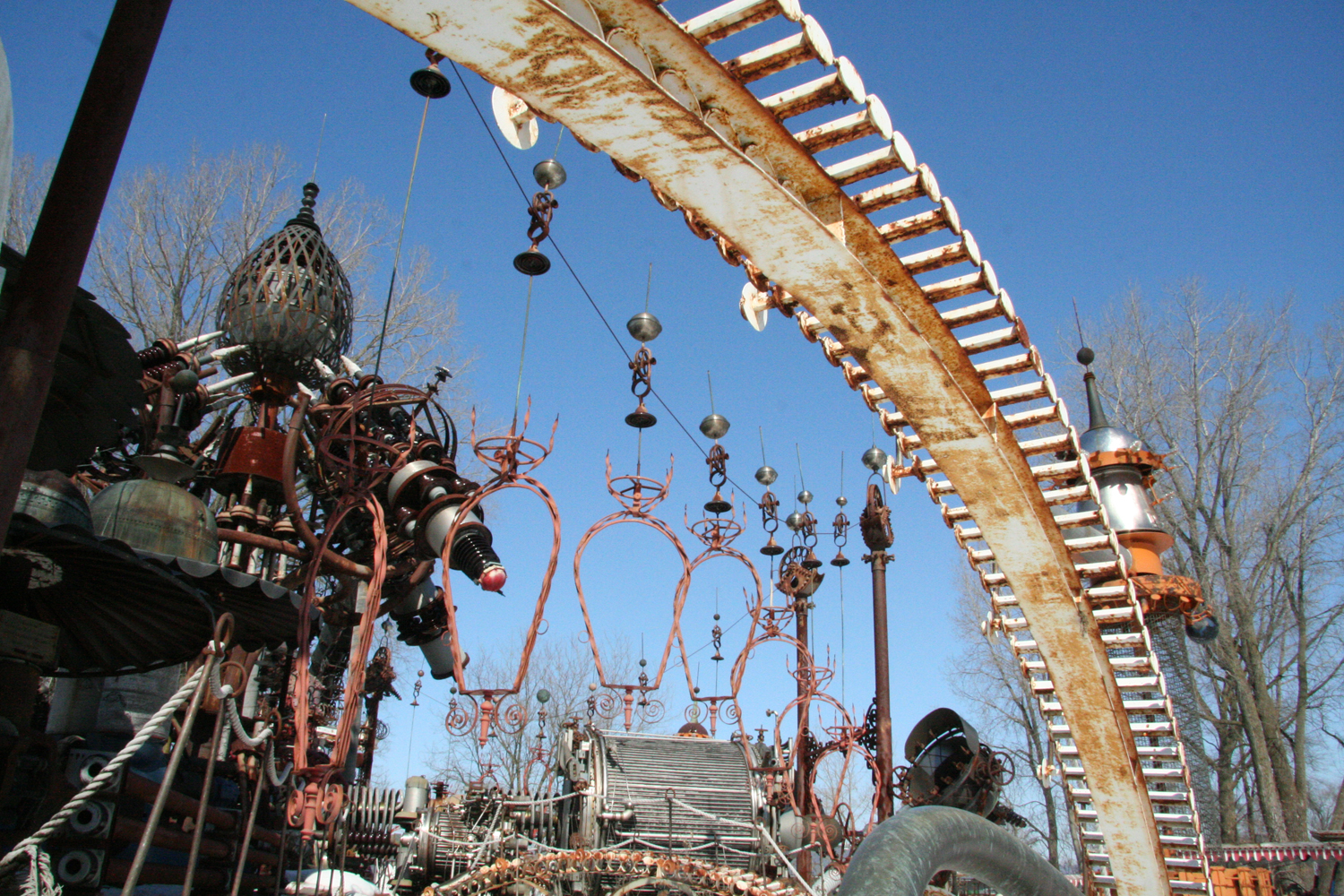
Forevertron Bridge

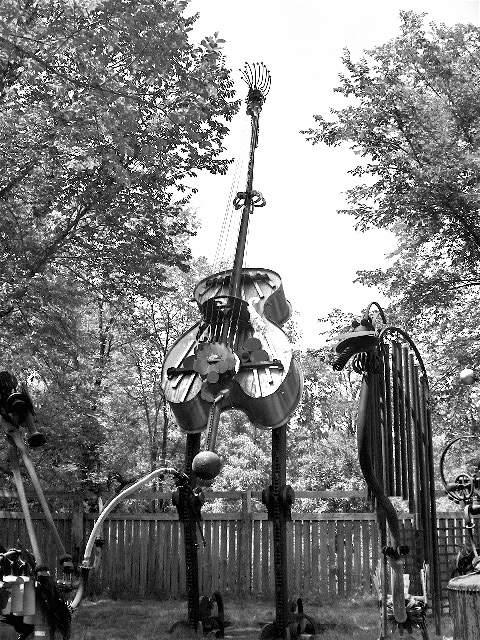
Bird Symphony's Bass Section

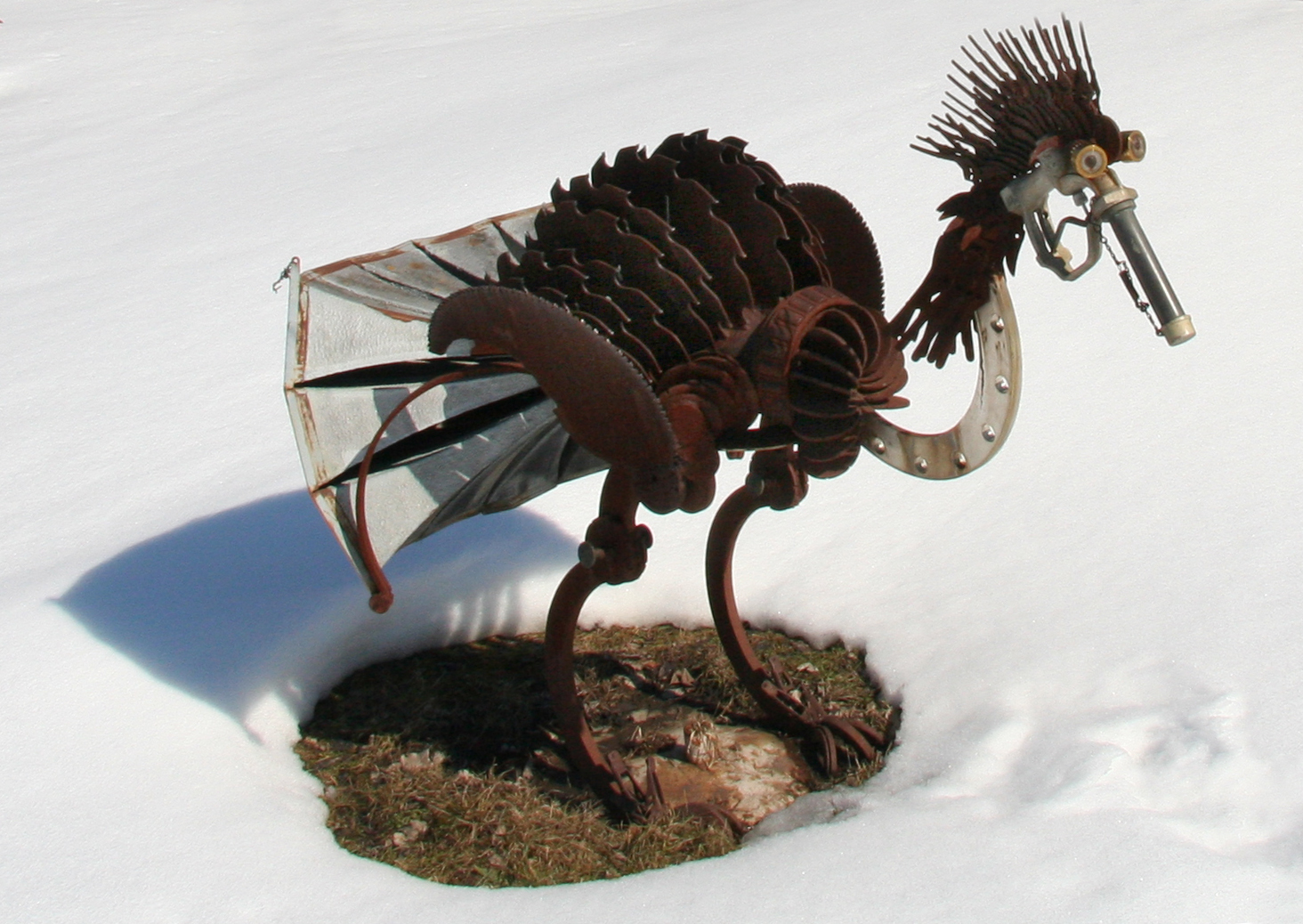
Loudspeaker bird

Dr. Evermor's Forevertron is the 2nd largest scrap metal sculpture in the world (after Gary Greff's Geese In Flight), standing 50 ft. (15,2 m.) high and 120 ft. (36,5 m.) wide, and weighing 300 tons. Built in the 1980s, it is housed in Dr. Evermor's Art Park on Highway 12, in the town of Sumpter, in Sauk County, Wisconsin, United States.

The sculpture incorporates two Thomas Edison dynamos from the 1880s, lightning rods, high-voltage components from 1920s power plants, scrap from the nearby Badger Army Ammunition Plant, and the decontamination chamber from the Apollo 11 spacecraft. Its creator, Tom Every (1938 - 2020), was born in Brooklyn, Wisconsin and was a demolition expert who spent decades collecting antique machinery for the sculpture and the surrounding fiction that justifies it. According to Every, Dr. Evermor was a Victorian inventor who designed the Forevertron to launch himself, "into the heavens on a magnetic lightning force beam." The Forevertron, despite its size and weight, was designed to be relocatable to a different site—the sculpture is built in sections that are connected by bolts and pins.

In addition to the Forevertron itself, the sculpture includes a tea house gazebo from which Every says: "Queen Victoria and Prince Albert may observe the launching of Dr. Evermor; it also includes a giant telescope where skeptics may observe the ascent." Dr. Evermor's art park is home to a large number of other sculptures, many of which relate to the Forevertron, such as the Celestial Listening Ear and the Overlord Master Control Tower. Other large-scale sculptures include gigantic insects (the Juicer Bug and Arachna Artie), the Epicurean bellows-driven barbecue train, The Dragon, and The UFO. The most numerous sculptures are the Bird Band and Orchestra which includes nearly 70 birds ranging from the size of a child to twenty feet tall, all made from scrap industrial parts, geological survey markers, knives, loudspeakers, springs, and musical instruments, among other salvaged materials.

Every related that he took pride in allowing the original materials to remain unaltered as much as possible, using their original forms in new juxtapositions to create his aesthetic. Although Every has now died, the sculpture park may be toured free of charge (donations are encouraged) and may be accessed directly from Highway 12. Every also created much of the installation art for the House on the Rock, including the world's largest carousel.
