= O.V. Shaffer =

American sculptor from Illinois

- Born: Owen Verne Shaffer; January 26, 1928; Princeton, Illinois
- Died: February 16, 2021 (aged 93); Princeton, Illinois

Owen Verne "O.V." Shaffer (January 26, 1928 – February 16, 2021) was an American sculptor, educator, and museum director, based primarily in Illinois and Wisconsin. Known for large-scale public sculpture in steel, brass, wood, and cast concrete, his works are installed throughout Wisconsin, particularly in Beloit and Janesville, as well as in various sites in Illinois, Maine, Florida, and Utah.

== Early life and education ==
Shaffer was born in Princeton, Illinois, on January 26, 1928. He enrolled at Beloit College in 1946 and graduated with a Bachelor of Arts degree in 1950. While at Beloit, he studied under painter Franklin Boggs, whom he later credited as an important influence on his development as an artist. After graduating, he taught briefly at Olivet College in Michigan before earning a master's degree in art from Michigan State University in 1955.

== Career and public sculpture ==
Following graduate studies, Shaffer joined the faculty of Beloit College, where he taught art and became the first director of the Wright Art Center, later the Wright Museum of Art. He served in that capacity from 1955 to 1964.

Shaffer subsequently left academia to pursue sculpture full time. He established a studio near Clinton, Wisconsin, as well as one in his hometown of Princeton, Illinois, and spent much of his professional career working from either space. He exhibited throughout the Midwest and received public commissions from five different states.

Shaffer became particularly associated with public art in southern Wisconsin. More than twenty-five of his sculptures are located in the city of Beloit, including seven on the Beloit College campus, while approximately sixty public works are installed throughout Wisconsin. He won the Wisconsin Governor's Award in the Arts in 1970. Among his best-known works is Slit, a welded brass sculpture outside the Logan Museum of Anthropology at Beloit College.

In 2012, Shaffer donated a large collection of his sculptures and drawings to the Kohler Foundation, which transferred it to the University of Wisconsin–Oshkosh. Two years later, in 2014, the Beloit Art Center organized a retrospective exhibition of Shaffer's work and then-Wisconsin Governor Scott Walker presented Shaffer with a "certificate of recognition" acknowledging his public art contributions in Wisconsin.

Shaffer died in Princeton, Illinois, on February 16, 2021, at the age of 93.
