= Alex Jordan Jr. =

American architect (1914–89)

Alexander John Jordan Jr. (March 3, 1914 – November 6, 1989) was best known as the creator of the House on the Rock, an eccentric architectural and entertainment attraction in Spring Green, Wisconsin. He was born in Madison, Wisconsin.

== Biography ==
Published information on Jordan's life is scant. There are three biographies, all self-published. One is an unsympathetic 1990 biography by Marv Balousek, a newspaper reporter for the Wisconsin State Journal, who describes his book as "an unauthorized biography, ...not been sanctioned by the new owner of The House on the Rock, nor by those closest to Jordan. Jennie Olson, his companion of 50 years, declined to be interviewed; so did Don Martin, who helped build every exhibit." A 1991 "authorized biography" by Doug Moe was published by The House on the Rock and is sold in its gift shop. Moe had access to and quotes Jennie Olson, Don Martin, and others not accessible to Balousek. The third book is "Never Enough: The Creative Life of Alex Jordan" by Tom Kupsh, published in 2014. Kupsh was a sculptor who worked for Jordan at the House on the Rock from 1977 to 1984. From 1989 to 1998, Kupsh was the creative director at the House on the Rock. In 2006 Kupsh returned to be a creative consultant.

Balousek describes Jordan as "a shadowy figure as reclusive as the late multi-millionaire Howard Hughes" Moe agrees that "Alex Jordan did not like or seek personal publicity."

Jordan tried a variety of conventional paths in life before focusing on his childhood love of architecture and electronic gadgets. Atop his favorite wilderness retreat, the 450' tall Deer Shelter Rock, Jordan began construction of a peculiar Japanese House in 1945. The structure imitated the "fusion with nature" design style of Frank Lloyd Wright.

Although he initially tried to keep curious onlookers away, Jordan found that he could finance additional electronic and architectural projects at the site by charging a tour fee. Using this money, Jordan continued to build his complex of uncommon interests until his death in 1989, aged 75.

In March 1964, Jordan traveled with friend Homer Fieldhouse to New York to help landscape the Wisconsin Pavilion exhibit at the 1964–65 New York World's Fair. Fieldhouse had been hired by Wisconsin's Lieutenant Governor, Jack Olson, to do the outdoor landscaping and to construct an indoor waterfall. Of particular interest to Jordan was a "talking" Abraham Lincoln, an audio-animatronic robot.

Jordan died at Meriter Hospital in Madison on November 6, 1989 following a heart attack.
