= Henry Vilas Zoo =

Zoo in Madison, Wisconsin

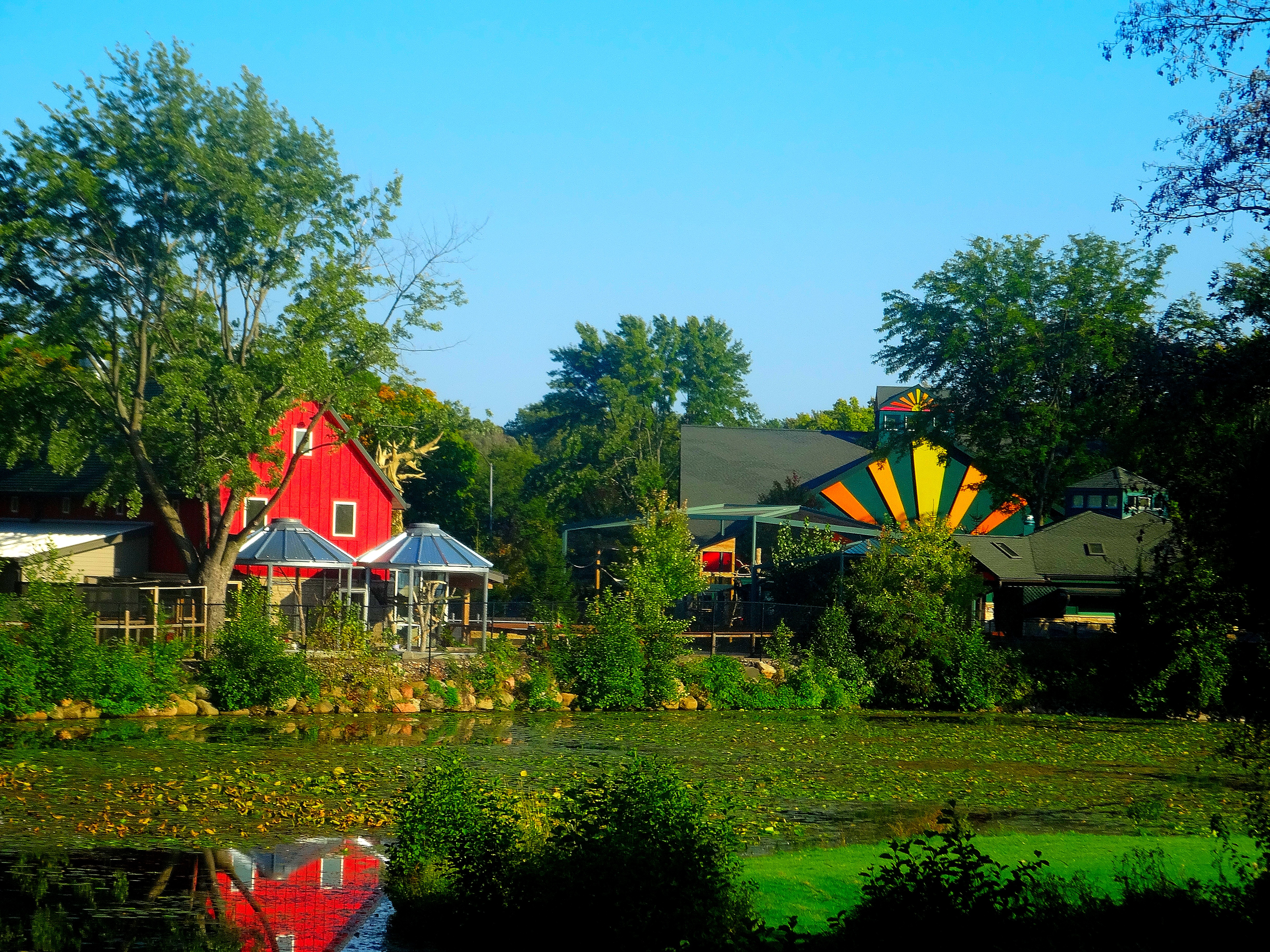
- Interactive map of Henry Vilas Zoo
- 43°3′34″N 89°24′37″W
- Location: Madison, Wisconsin, United States
- Land area: 28 acres (11 ha)
- No. of species: 95
- Annual visitors: 750,000
- Memberships: AZA
- Public transit: Metro Transit
- Website: henryvilaszoo.gov

Henry Vilas Zoo is a 28-acre (11 ha) public zoo in Madison, Wisconsin, United States, that is accredited by the Association of Zoos and Aquariums (AZA). Owned by Dane County, the zoo receives over 750,000 visitors annually.

== History ==
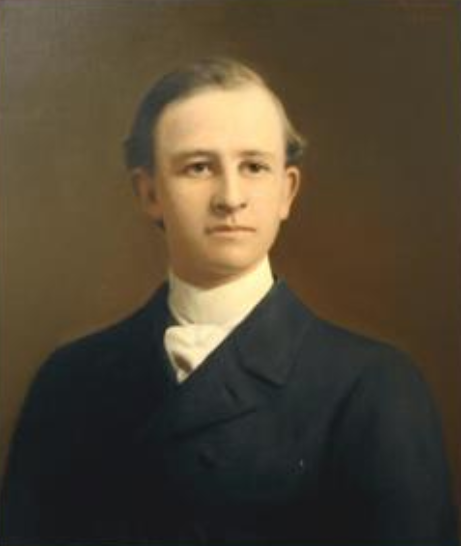
Henry Vilas' posthumous portrait by James R. Stuart (1904)

In 1904, the city received 50 acres (20 ha) of land from the former U.S. senator, William Freeman Vilas, and his wife, Anna Vilas, under the conditions that it be used "for the uses and purposes of a public park and pleasure ground". The park was named in honor of the Vilases' son, Henry, who died in 1899 at the age of 27 from complications related to diabetes. The family stipulated that the park always be admission-free.

By 1911, 28 acres (11 ha) of the park were partitioned into an animal exhibit, marking the creation of the zoo. The Madison Zoological and Aquarium Society was founded in 1914, and in 1926 became the Henry Vilas Park Zoological Society, which continues today. In 1964, the society was incorporated as a non-profit corporation.

For the hundredth anniversary of the zoo, the society operated a Zoo Century campaign to support a $27 million redevelopment of the zoo over the next 10 years. Plans call for a new Arctic Passage exhibit and a redesigned Children's Zoo. The Arctic Passage, which includes a major expansion that includes a new restaurant, and new enclosures for seals and returning grizzly and polar bears opened May 23, 2015.

The zoo hosts an annual Zoo Run Run with a 5K–10K run/walk. The race starts and finishes in the zoo, and uses portions of the adjacent University of Wisconsin–Madison Arboretum.

The Henry Vilas Zoo is one of ten remaining free zoos in North America. As an accredited AZA (Association of Zoos & Aquariums) zoo, their mission is to conserve and protect the wonders of the natural living world. 2026 marked 50 years of accreditation by the AZA for the Henry Vilas Zoo.

== Incidents ==
=== 1960 monkey escape ===
On August 4, 1960, 38 18-month old Rhesus macaques escaped from the zoo due to a loose wire gate in the basement of the old monkey house. Upon escaping it is speculated they didn’t have a plan as they stayed in the canopy’s of trees. It took 4 months for all of them to be recaptured.

=== 1966 elephant attack ===
On June 1, 1966, an Asian elephant named Winkie pulled the 3-year old daughter of a Princeton University professor through the bars of her enclosure after she entered the outer fence in an attempt to feed her popcorn. The elephant then fatally stepped on her chest and then kicked her body to one side before walking away. Two days after the incident the zoo blocked the gate to the outer fence.

=== 1988 polar bear attack ===
On March 13, 1988, a twenty-eight-year-old man with a history of mental illness jumped a moat and climbed a wall to enter an enclosure containing a male polar bear named Chief. The responding officer shot Chief when the bear could not be scared off, and the man was booked into UW Health University Hospital for a psychiatric evaluation.

=== 1997 monkey scandal ===
On August 11, 1997 the University of Wisconsin-Madison was caught violating an agreement with the zoo. The university was secretly using Rhesus macaques in invasive experiments which violated an 8 year agreement that they wouldn't be used for harmful research. Rather than being sent to a sanctuary or being returned to the zoo the university decided to send the monkeys to Tulane University for more harmful research which sparked an attempt to free them as a plan to raise funds to buy them and send them to a sanctuary had failed.

=== 2014 giraffe attack ===
On August 17, 2014, a woman from California was licked and kicked in the face by a giraffe named Wally after climbing into the enclosure. She was later cited by Madison police.

=== 2022 controversy ===
In 2022, after the only two black zookeepers at the Zoo resigned in part due to perceived poor management, racism, and retaliation from management, Dane County started an investigation into the practices of the zoo. The county found that the zoo created a toxic work environment, a lack of employees of color, inadequate welfare for animals, and management favoritism toward certain employees.

The county then authorized an independent investigation. This investigation found no evidence of a hostile work environment nor discrimination, but some evidence of isolated past issues with animal treatment.

== Animals and exhibits ==
The zoo houses amphibians, birds, fish, insects, mammals, and reptiles from several continents.

=== Arctic Passage ===
Opened in 2015, the Arctic Passage features large, natural habitats for polar bears and harbour seals. The polar bear and harbour seal exhibits have underwater viewing and there is a stream for the other section of the polar bear habitat. The exhibit includes several sustainability features like solar panels, rainwater harvesting and an underground storage unit that saves over 2 million gallons of water.

=== George Fait North American Prairie ===
The George Fait North American Prairie is a large yard home to the zoo's American bison. This area was also once home to prairie dogs, but bad weather in the winter of 2018-2019 killed all but one, which was later transferred to the Ochsner Park Zoo in Baraboo.

=== Wisconsin Heritage Trail ===
The Wisconsin Heritage Trail opened in 2016 and highlights Wisconsin's rich mining history. It has enclosures for American badgers and an empty enclosure that once had a sandhill crane named Buckbeak.

=== Tropical Rainforest Aviary ===
A $4.2 million aviary opened in 2000. Outside the aviary are enclosures for capybaras and North American river otters. The aviary is home to many birds like blue-and-yellow macaws, blue-crowned motmots, white faced whistling duck and helmeted curassow as well as Geoffroy's marmoset, Seba's short-tailed bat, red-footed tortoise, Hoffmans two-toed sloth and fish like Midas cichlid and Pacu

=== Big Cats Exhibit ===
The zoo houses African lions and Amur tigers in enclosures simulating their natural habitats in the wild with features like heated rocks to keep them warm during winter. Nearby is an enclosure for North American porcupines.

=== Primate House ===
Opened in 1995, the Primate House houses three species of primates, Bornean orangutans, black-and-white ruffed lemurs and ring-tailed lemurs. It is also home to rock hyraxes.

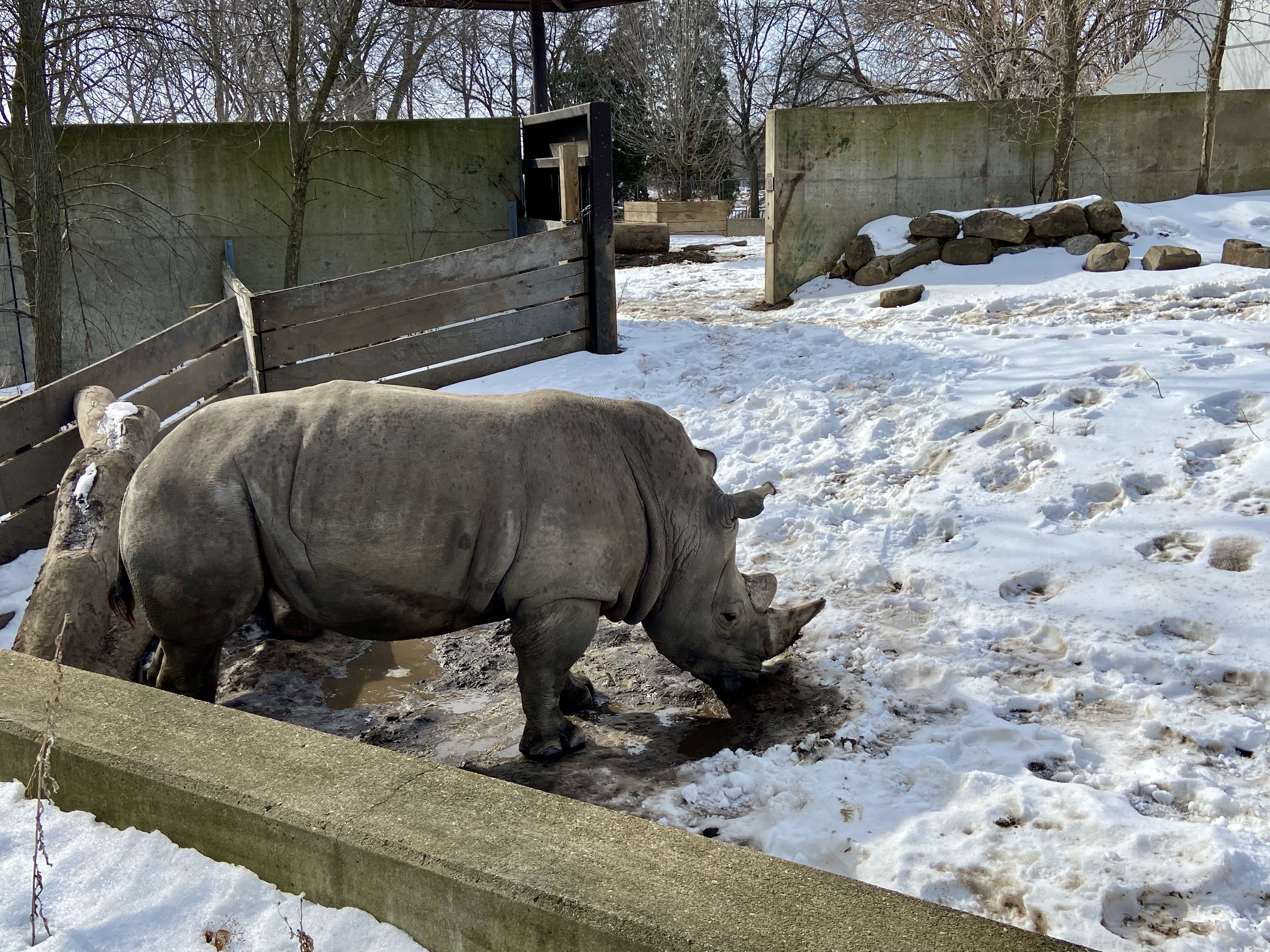
Harmon, the zoo's Rhinoceros

=== Savanna and High Plains ===
These yards are home to the zoo's larger hoofstock, Bactrian camels, Somali wild ass and a white rhinoceros named Harmon. The yards are soon to be home to the zoo’s largest renovation since the Arctic Passage, Edge of Africa: Giraffe which will double the outdoor size and triple the indoor size of the zoos last giraffe house. It will house Reticulated giraffes and ground birds like the Rüpell's vulture and the Maribou stork. In 2026 the zoo announced Harmon will be leaving the zoo as the rhino barn is in the construction zone of Edge of Africa: Giraffe.

=== Children's Zoo ===
The Children's Zoo features the sustainably designed Red Barn, which houses their goats, which can be hand fed. It also features exhibits for red pandas, white-handed gibbons, cape porcupines, meerkats, aardvarks, Von Der Decken’s hornbills, American flamingos and Chilean flamingos. There is also a koi pond, a train and a carousel.

=== Discovery Center and Herpetarium ===
The Herpetarium is home to the zoo's reptiles and amphibians. Aldabra giant tortoises and American alligators have outdoor exhibits. Some of the collection include green anaconda, massasauga, alligator snapping turtle, Gila monster, Standing's day geckos, leaf-tailed geckos, desert tortoises, dyeing poison dart frogs, Golfodulcean poison frogs, green and black poison dart frogs, strawberry poison-dart frogs and yellow-banded poison dart frogs.

The Discovery Center once allowed hands-on interactions with animals. However it is now only available to the zoos summer camp.
