= Wisconsin Trails =

- Editor: Kristen Scheuing
- Frequency: Bimonthly
- Founded: 1960
- Final issue: January 2013
- Company: Gannett
- Country: USA
- Based in: Milwaukee, Wisconsin
- Language: English
- Website: http://www.wisconsintrails.com/

Wisconsin Trails magazine was a bimonthly regional magazine that covered life around the state of Wisconsin, from people, history and culture to travel, nature and environmentalism. Its circulation as of mid-2007 was about 50,000. It existed between 1960 and 2013.

== History ==
The first issue of Wisconsin Tales & Trails magazine appeared in spring 1960, in Fort Atkinson, Wisconsin. The founder and first editor was Leroy Gore whose purpose was "to make Wisconsin so irresistible that outsiders couldn't stay away and insiders couldn't bear the thought of leaving." A year later, Gore sold the magazine to Howard and Nancy Mead, who began publishing it from the basement of their Madison home.

Under the Meads' direction, the magazine covered everything from outdoor sports to Wisconsin lore. Over the years, readers got to know the Meads and their children through the pages of the magazine. The Meads shortened the name to Wisconsin Trails in 1971. In 1982, the magazine began accepting advertising.

In 1998, Scott Klug, a former Republican congressman from Wisconsin, and a group of investors bought the magazine and built a small publishing company, Trails Media Group, around it. Klug acquired or started a number of other properties, including Milwaukee Home, Corporate Report Wisconsin, Wisconsin Meetings, MadGuide, and No Limits magazines; Trails Books, which published regional guides and calendars; and a custom publishing division. Klug moved the company from Madison to Black Earth in 2000. Other editors during this time included Kate Bast and Harriet Brown.

Big Earth Publishing bought Trails Books in 2005. In early 2007, Klug sold off all divisions of the company. The Milwaukee Journal Sentinel bought Wisconsin Trails and Milwaukee Home (name changed to Milwaukee Home and Fine Living) magazines in February 2007, and made them part of its new Specialty Media Division, which also includes MetroParent and other publications. In August 2007, Wisconsin Trails moved back to offices in Madison. In March 2008, the magazine offices moved to the Milwaukee Journal Sentinel printing facility in West Milwaukee and in 2009, moved to the Milwaukee Journal Sentinel building in downtown Milwaukee. In 2010, MJS shut down Milwaukee Home and Fine Living. Gannett acquired the Journal Sentinel's parent company in 2016. The final issue of Wisconsin Trails was the January 2013 issue, while the magazine's website continued on for a period of time. (It now redirects to the Milwaukee Journal Sentinel website.)

Wisconsin Trails was named one of the "50 best magazines" in 2006 by the Chicago Tribune and was a member of the International Regional Magazine Association.
