= Hans Christian Heg =

19th-century American politician

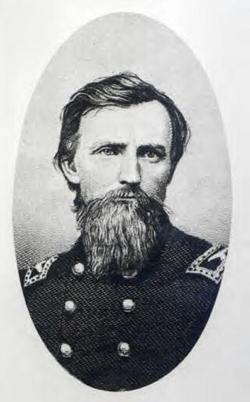

6th Prison Commissioner of Wisconsin
- In office January 2, 1860 – January 6, 1862
- Governor: Alexander Randall
- Preceded by: Edward M. McGraw
- Succeeded by: Alexander P. Hodges

Personal details
- Born: December 21, 1829 Lier, Norway
- Died: September 20, 1863 (aged 33) Chickamauga, Georgia, U.S.
- Resting place: Norway Cemetery, Norway, Wisconsin
- Party: Republican

Military service
- Allegiance: United States
- Branch/service: United States Volunteers; Union Army
- Years of service: 1861–1863
- Rank: Colonel, USV
- Unit: 15th Reg. Wis. Vol. Infantry; 3rd Bde, 1st Div, XX Corps
- Battles/wars: American Civil War; Battle of Perryville; Battle of Stones River; Battle of Chickamauga †

Hans Christian Heg (December 21, 1829 – September 20, 1863) was a Norwegian American journalist, anti-slavery activist, politician, and soldier. He was best known for leading the 15th Wisconsin Infantry Regiment (known as the Scandinavian Regiment) on the Union side in the American Civil War; he died of wounds he received at the Battle of Chickamauga. He previously held elected office as the 6th prison commissioner of Wisconsin (1860–1862).

A bronze statue of Heg in military gear stands at the east corner of the Wisconsin State Capitol Square.

== Early life, immigration, and education ==
Heg was born at Haugestad in the community of Lierbyen in Lier, Buskerud, Norway on December 21, 1829. He was the eldest of the four children of the innkeeper Even Hansen Heg (1790–1850) and his wife Sigrid "Siri" Olsdatter Kallerud Heg (1799–1842). The family moved to America in 1840, settling in the Muskego Settlement in Wisconsin. Hans Heg was eleven years old when his family arrived in Muskego. He soon earned a reputation for himself as being a gifted boy.

== Career ==
At twenty years old, lured by the discovery of gold in the Sacramento Valley, he and three friends joined the army of "Forty-Niners". He spent the next two years prospecting for gold in California. Upon the death of his father, he returned to the Muskego area in 1851. He married Gunhild Einong (1833–1922), daughter of a Norwegian immigrant. His daughter Hilda S. married New Jersey politician Charles N. Fowler.

Heg was a major in the 4th Wisconsin Militia, and became a rising young politician who found slavery abhorrent. He was an outspoken anti-slavery activist and a leader of Wisconsin's Wide Awakes, an anti-slave catcher militia. He became an ardent member of the Free Soil Party, and soon joined the recently formed Republican Party. In 1859, Heg was elected commissioner of the state prison in Waupun, and served there for two years. He was the first Norwegian-born candidate elected statewide in Wisconsin. Heg spearheaded many reforms to the prison, believing that prisons should be used to "reclaim the wandering and save the lost". On August 1, 1860, at great risk to his career, he provided shelter to Sherman Booth, a man who was made a federal fugitive after inciting a mob to rescue an escaped slave.

== Military service ==
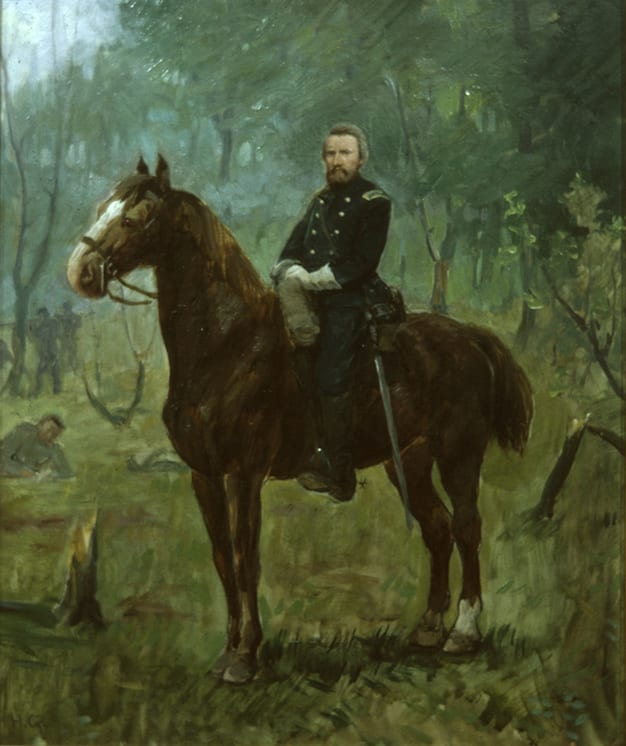
Colonel Hans Christian Heg. Painting by Herbjørn Gausta (1854-1924) in 1915

Grave marker of Col. Hans Christian Heg at Norway Lutheran Church Cemetery, Wind Lake, Wisconsin

With the outbreak of the Civil War, Heg was appointed by Governor Alexander Randall as colonel of the 15th Wisconsin Infantry Regiment. Appealing to all young "Norsemen," he said, "the government of our adopted country is in danger. It is our duty as brave and intelligent citizens to extend our hands in defense of the cause of our Country and of our homes." The 15th Wisconsin was called the Scandinavian Regiment because its soldiers were almost all immigrants from Norway, with some from Denmark and Sweden. It was the only all-Scandinavian regiment in the Union Army. On 8 October 1862, Colonel Heg led his regiment into its first action at the Battle of Perryville. Despite being under fire while being driven back several miles by the enemy, the 15th Wisconsin suffered few casualties and no fatalities. However, one of those hurt was Colonel Heg, who was injured when his horse fell.

Heg commanded the regiment during the Battle of Stones River. In response to his conduct at Stones River, Maj. Gen. William Rosecrans placed Heg in command of the newly formed 3rd Brigade of the 1st Division, XX Corps, Army of the Cumberland, on May 1, 1863. Heg fought in the Tullahoma campaign of June–July 1863.

On September 18, 1863, Heg led his brigade at the Battle of Chickamauga, where was mortally wounded. On the evening of September 19, the first day of the battle, he was shot in the abdomen by a Confederate sharpshooter. He rallied his troops, but eventually had to give over his command. He was taken to a field hospital at Crawfish Spring, where he died on the morning of September 20. A surgeon who witnessed his passing recalled that "it was agonizing to stand beside the colonel and see him suffer and die. Colonel La Grange of the First Wisconsin Cavalry and other friends who called to see him wept like children. Everybody who knew him loved him." Upon hearing of his death, Rosecrans expressed regret, saying "I am very sorry to hear that Heg has fallen. He was a brave officer, and I intended to promote him to be general." Heg was one of five Wisconsinite colonels killed as a result of combat during the Civil War. "Colonel Hans C. Heg was Acting Brigadier General of the Third Brigade, Davis' Division, and therefore the highest ranking officer from Wisconsin killed in the Civil War."

Heg was buried at the Norway Lutheran Church Cemetery near Wind Lake, Wisconsin.

== Vandalizing of Heg's statue in Madison, Wisconsin ==
A statue of Hans Christian Heg by Paul Fjelde was installed at the King Street approach to the State Capitol in Madison, Wisconsin in 1925. On June 23, 2020, rioters incensed by the arrest of a member of Black Lives Matter used a towing vehicle to pull the statue down. It was then vandalized, decapitated and thrown into Lake Monona. The words "black is beautiful" were spray-painted on the plinth, just above Heg's name. Forward, a statue designed by Jean Pond Miner Coburn to represent the state of Wisconsin, was also pulled down. Both statues were later recovered by the authorities, though Heg's was said to have lost a leg.

On July 20, 2020, the Wisconsin Capitol and Executive Residence Board voted unanimously to restore both Heg's statue and Forward to their original condition and placement atop their pedestals. Since his statue's head was still missing, state officials planned to create a new one using a statue of Heg in the town of Norway as a model. The state of Wisconsin received a grant of $30,000 from the National Endowment for the Humanities the following October towards the expense of repairing of both the Heg and Forward statues. The statues were taken to Detroit where Venus Bronze Works Inc. worked to restore them, with reinstallation on the Capitol grounds then anticipated by July 2021. By mid-September 2021, Heg's statue was "nearly ready to be shipped to Wisconsin".

On September 21, 2021, the statue was reinstated.

== Legacy ==
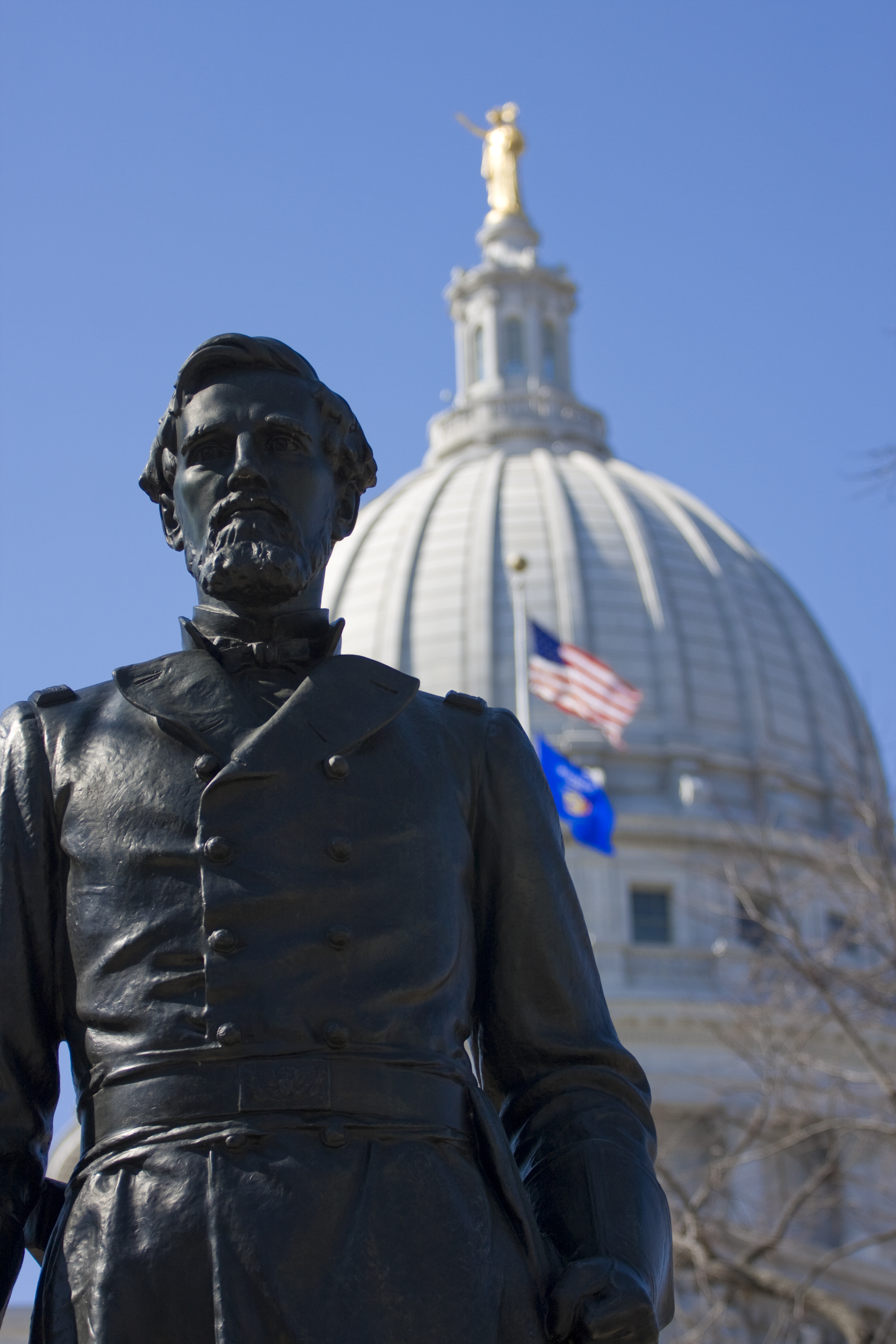
Statue of Col. Hans Christian Heg, Wisconsin State Capitol, Madison. During riots in June 2020, the statue was pulled down, decapitated, and thrown into Lake Monona.

- A statue of Hans Christian Heg is located in Norway, Wisconsin.
- A replica statue stands in Heg's birthplace at Haugestad in the community of Lierbyen in Lier, Norway. It was a gift by Norwegian-Americans to the people of Norway. The unveiling of this statue took place on Midsummer Day, June 24, 1925.
- Heg Memorial Park in Racine County is named in his honor. Heg Memorial Park Museum is located on Heg Park Road in Wind Lake, Wisconsin. His original homestead house is located a short distance from the Heg Memorial Park.
- Another house formerly owned by Hans Christian Heg was located at the current site of the Waterford, Wisconsin, Public Library.
- The Hans C. Heg Shell Monument at Chickamauga and Chattanooga National Military Park was dedicated in 1893. Located at 34°54.232′N 85°15.73′W it is a "triangular pyramid monument of eight inch shells, ten feet in height, [which] marks the spot where Colonel Heg was mortally wounded (seven more of these pyramids can be located throughout Chickamauga Battlefield). The monument can be found in Viniard Field beside the LaFayette Road at Tour Stop #5."
- The Liberty Ship SS Hans Heg (hull number 2751) was laid down on January 26, 1944 at Kaiser Permanente No. 2 shipyard in Richmond CA under the Merchant Marine Act of 1936. The ship launched on February 14, 1944, was owned by the U.S. Department of Commerce and operated by James Griffiths & Sons Inc. The ship sailed overseas including to Dutch New Guinea in and during the Second World War. She was scrapped in 1961.
- A post office in Muskego, Wisconsin is named in his honor. On June 25, 2020, in response to the vandalism, Representative Bryan Steil had introduced a bill to rename a post office in Muskego, Wisconsin the "Colonel Hans Christian Heg Post Office." Passage of this bill failed, though Representative Scott Fitzgerald introduced a similar bill on 1 February 2024. As of 19 February the bill had been referred to the House Committee on Oversight and Accountability but the House did not pass it. Rep. Fitzgerald eventually introduced H.R.7199 - To designate the facility of the United States Postal Service located at S74w16860 Janesville Road, in Muskego, Wisconsin, as the "Colonel Hans Christian Heg Post Office" for the legislative year of the 118th Congress, and this measure passed in the House successfully on June 4, 2024. The Senate approved the bill by unanimous consent on November 19, and President Biden signed it into law on November 25, becoming Public Law No. 118-217. Rep. Fitzgerald said after the bill's signing that "after overwhelming support in the House and Senate, I am humbled to see my bill to rename the U.S. Post Office in Muskego in honor of Colonel Hans Christian Heg signed into law. This bill is a tribute to the incredible legacy of Colonel Heg—a legacy he’s defined as a war hero, a patriot, and a staunch abolitionist. Colonel Heg will be remembered and revered for generations to come in Wisconsin, and this bill will help cement his role in American history.”

== Electoral history ==
=== Wisconsin Prison Commissioner (1859) ===
Wisconsin Prison Commissioner Election, 1859
Party	Candidate	Votes	%	±%
General Election, November 8, 1859
Republican	Hans C. Heg	59,609	53.09%	+2.77%
Democratic	H. C. Fleck	52,673	46.91%	
Plurality		6,936	6.18%	+5.54%
Total votes		112,282	100.0%	+27.24%
Republican hold				

== See also ==
- Wisconsin in the American Civil War

Party political offices
Preceded by Edward M. McGraw	Republican nominee for Prison Commissioner of Wisconsin; 1859	Succeeded by Alexander P. Hodges
Military offices
Regiment established	Command of the 15th Wisconsin Infantry Regiment; February 14, 1862 – September 20, 1863	Succeeded by Maj. George Wilson
Political offices
Preceded by Edward M. McGraw	Prison Commissioner of Wisconsin; January 2, 1860 – January 6, 1862	Succeeded by Alexander P. Hodges
