= John Anderson (publisher) =

Norwegian-American publisher

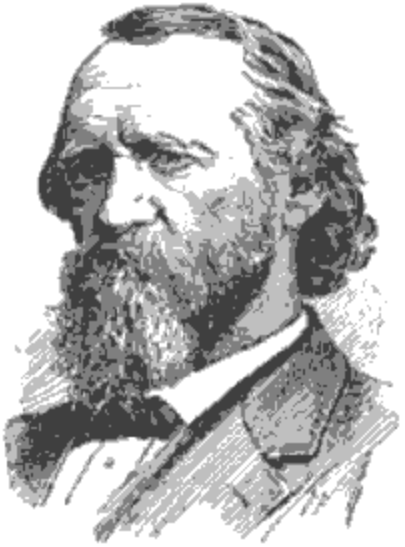

Personal details
- Born: March 22, 1836 Voss, Norway
- Died: February 24, 1910 (aged 73) Chicago, Illinois
- Spouses: Maria Christine Frank (m. 1859) Julia Sampson (m. 1875)
- Children: 4
- Occupation: Publisher

John Anderson (March 22, 1836 – February 24, 1910) was a Norwegian-American publisher.

== Background ==
John Anderson was born in Voss in Søndre Bergenhus Amt, Norway. He was the son of Anders Knudsen Saue (1806–49) and Ragnhild Samsonsdatter Øen (1812–97). He was brought by his parents to Chicago in 1845. His father subsequently died in the cholera epidemic in 1849. Anderson soon became an errand boy in a shop and delivered newspapers for the Commercial Advertiser. This led to a position as an apprentice typographer at that publication. Anderson subsequently worked for the Chicago Tribune. He decided in 1866 to leave the Chicago Tribune to start his own company.

== Career ==
In 1866, Anderson founded Skandinaven, a weekly or semi-weekly Norwegian-language newspaper together with Iver Lawson (1821–1871) and Knud Langeland (1813–1888). Lawson was principally an investor. Langeland was the newspaper's first editor, while Anderson took care of the business side of the business. Anderson purchased the subscription lists of Marcus Thrane's Norske-Amerikanerne, a failing Norwegian-language newspaper. Langeland and Lawson left Skandinaven in 1872 and established Amerika, a rival paper. Skandinaven merged briefly with Amerika in 1873 to form Skandinaven og Amerika. Starting in the 1870s, Skandinaven published a magazine that contained articles of interest, stories, and poetry. It carried works by Norwegian-American writers including Hjalmar Hjorth Boyesen and Rasmus B. Anderson. In 1901, Anderson was knighted by King Oscar II in the Royal Norwegian Order of St. Olav for his work in Skandinaven.

Skandinaven became one of the most influential and successful newspapers in the Scandinavian immigrant community. Through the success of the paper, Anderson was able to build a publishing business that became one of the largest venture of its kind. The newspaper was in operation from May 1866 until October 1941. When Skandinaven suspended publication, Reidar Rye Haugan established the Norwegian-language newspaper Viking, for which he served as both editor and publisher.

== Personal life ==
He married Maria Christine Frank on September 22, 1859 and they had one son. He remarried in 1875, to Julia Sampson, and they had two sons and one daughter.

John Anderson died at his home in Chicago on February 24, 1910.

== Other sources ==
- Øverland, Orm (1986) Skandinaven and the beginnings of professional publishing (Northfield, Minn: Norwegian-American Historical Association)
- Wist, J. B. (1914) Norsk-amerikanernes festskrift 1914 (Decorah, Iowa)

== Related reading ==
- Øverland, Orm (1996) The Western Home: a literary history of Norwegian America (Norwegian-American Historical Association) ISBN 978-0252023279
- Odd S. Lovoll (2010) Norwegian Newspapers in America: Connecting Norway and the New Land (Minnesota Historical Society) ISBN 9780873517720
