= Statue of Hans Christian Heg =

Statue in Madison, Wisconsin

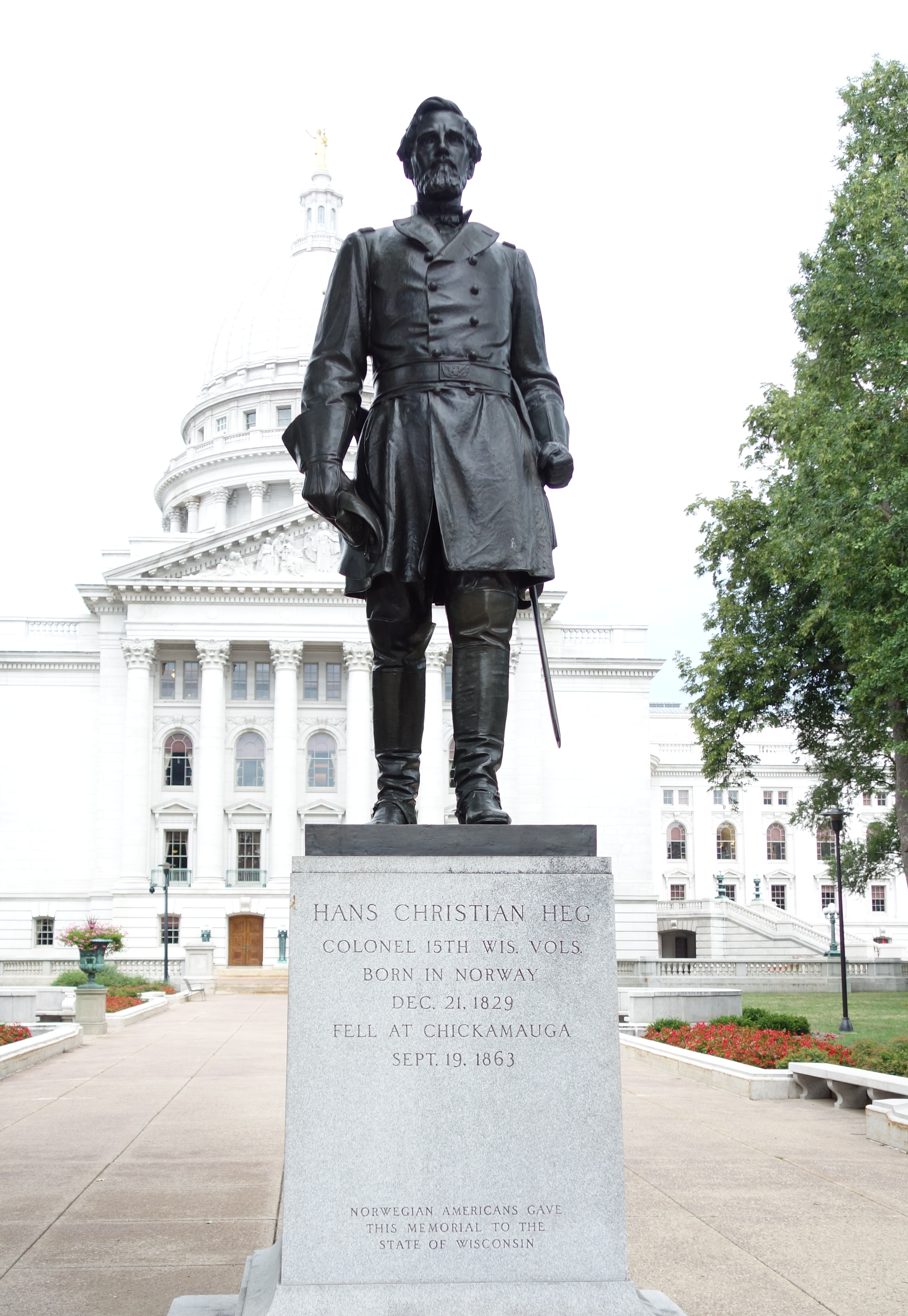
- The statue in 2013
- Artist: Paul Fjelde
- Completion date: 17 October 1926 (erected)
- Medium: Bronze sculpture; granite (base)
- Subject: Hans Christian Heg
- Dimensions: 290 cm × 91 cm × 91 cm (9 ft 6 in × 3 ft × 3 ft)
- Condition: Restored and reinstated after removal by rioters
- Location: Madison, Wisconsin, U.S.; 43°04′28.8″N 89°22′56.9″W

Hans Christian Heg is a statue by Paul Fjelde that was cast in 1925 and installed at the Wisconsin State Capitol building in Madison, Wisconsin, United States in 1926.

Two further casts of the statue were made in 1925: one stands in Heg Memorial Park, in Racine County, Wisconsin, near the Heg family home, and the other in Haugestad, near the family's home town in Norway.

== Background ==
Hans Christian Heg (1829–1863) was a Norwegian American abolitionist, journalist, politician and soldier. He was born at Haugestad in the community of Lierbyen in Lier, Buskerud, Norway, where his father ran an inn. His family emigrated to the U.S. in 1840, and settled at the Muskego Settlement, Wisconsin. After two years as a Forty-Niner in California following the California Gold Rush, Heg returned to then settle in Wisconsin.

Heg is best known as the colonel who commanded the 15th Wisconsin Volunteer Regiment on the Union side in the American Civil War. He died of the wounds he received at the Battle of Chickamauga. A 10 ft (3.0 m) high pyramid of 8 in (20 cm) shells at Chickamauga and Chattanooga National Military Park marks the site on the battlefield where Heg was mortally wounded.

== Description ==
The bronze sculpture measures approximately 9.5 by 3 by 3 feet (2.90 m × 0.91 m × 0.91 m), and stands on a granite base which measures approximately 6 by 5 by 5 feet (1.8 m × 1.5 m × 1.5 m).

The statue depicts Colonel Heg standing in his Union Army uniform, with a long belted double-breasted dress coat, riding boots, and girt with a sword to his left side. He has a beard and moustache, and is bare headed, with his Hardee hat held in his right hand.

== History ==
The statue was created in 1925 as a gift of the Norwegian Society of America, which raised funds for its cost. The sculptor of the statue was Paul Fjelde who, in describing his work said, "The figure that I have created shows a much younger Colonel Heg than his photographs. After all he was a young man, only thirty-three when he died. I tried to regain the spirit of youth which must have been his before the cares of war had aged him beyond his years. I think I have succeeded."

The statue is one of three casts made at the foundry of Ernst Poleszynski in Kristiania, Norway. It was shipped in 1925 from Norway on the Norwegian-American Line, arrived in New York on August 21 of that year, and completed the rest of its journey to Madison on September 3. After its arrival, the 2,000 lb (910 kg) crate containing the statue was stored in the northeast pavilion of the Wisconsin Capitol. The delay between arrival and dedication lasted for more than a year, and was due to the need to raise some $2,000 to purchase and erect a base for the statue's final home. By joint resolution No., 30, 1925 of the Wisconsin state assembly and senate, the statue was to be "placed in the capitol park at Madison, Wisconsin" in the centennial year of the beginning of Norwegian immigration to the United States.

Two thousand spectators attended the unveiling of the statue on October 17, 1926 at the Wisconsin State Capitol. It was dedicated "in memory of a distinguished citizen and volunteer soldier of the Civil war period."

=== Other casts ===
A second cast of the statue was erected in Heg Memorial Park, in Racine County, Wisconsin, near the Heg family home, and dedicated in 1928.

A third cast of the statue was unveiled in 1925, in Haugestad, near his family's home town in Norway.

=== 2020 vandalism ===
On June 23, 2020, during the George Floyd protests, the statue was vandalized by protesters, incensed by the arrest of a member of Black Lives Matter, as demonstrations in the city of Madison turned violent. Vandals used a towing vehicle to pull the statue down. It was then vandalized, decapitated, and thrown into Lake Monona. The words "black is beautiful" were spray-painted on the plinth, just above Heg's name.

On the morning of June 24, someone painted "Fire Matt Kenny" on the base of the Heg statue. (This was a reference to the 2015 shooting of Tony Robinson; the police officer was cleared of any criminal wrongdoing, and is still employed.) Another Capitol Hill statue toppled on the same night, Forward, is of a female figure representing Wisconsin's "Forward" motto. Both statues were later recovered by the authorities, though Heg was said to have lost a leg.

Unlike Confederate statues removed during the George Floyd protests, this statue was of a Union soldier and abolitionist, The Associated Press reported that "it seems likely that few Wisconsinites know Heg's biography". Protester Micah Le said the two statues paint a picture of Wisconsin as a racially progressive state "even though slavery has continued in the form of a corrections system built around incarcerating Blacks." Two protesters interviewed by the Wisconsin State Journal said that toppling the statues was to draw attention to their view of Wisconsin as being racially unjust. Black students also had called for the removal of the statue of Abraham Lincoln at the University of Wisconsin–Madison in early June 2020, and repeated those calls after Heg's statue was toppled.

In an internal memo obtained by The Nation, the toppling of the statue was listed as one of the contributing factors in creating the federal riot control program Protecting American Communities Task Force.

In light of legislative attention from within Wisconsin as well as both chambers of the U.S. Congress, and amid public calls for the statue to be restored, the State Capitol and Executive Residence Board (SCERB) on July 20, 2020 voted unanimously to repair the Colonel Heg and Forward statues. As of that date, the Wisconsin Department of Administration was still compiling a cost estimate, and the Wisconsin Historical Society planned to start a fundraising drive to raise $50,000 to offset the insurance deductible. The SCERB signed off on that effort unanimously as well. At the time of the vote, the head and the spur of the right boot of the statue were still missing, and photographs of the statue showed the left leg as still removed as well. The Wisconsin State Department of Administration planned to build a new head by recasting the head of a similar Heg statue near the town of Norway, Wisconsin. The state of Wisconsin received a grant of $30,000 from the National Endowment for the Humanities the following October towards the expense of repairing of both the Heg and Forward statues. The statues were taken to Detroit for restoration by Venus Bronze Works Inc. with reinstallation on the Capitol grounds then anticipated by July 2021.

On June 25, 2020, in response to the vandalism, U.S. Representative Bryan Steil introduced a bill to rename Muskego's post office for Heg, though it was never acted on during the remainder of the 116th United States Congressional session and has not been re-introduced.

The police charged Rodney A. Clendening with felony due to the theft of Heg's head in January 2021. According to the complaint, a city street camera captured Clendening on the night of the vandalism with two other men at the Heg plinth and carrying Heg’s head. One of the men put the head into the trunk of Clendening's car. In a Madison Court on December 7, 2021, Marquon Clark pleaded guilty to two charges of criminal damage to property; namely that he helped pull down the Forward and Hans Christian Heg statues on the Capitol square June 23, 2020, contributing to between $60,000 and $95,000 in damage. He was sentenced to two years in prison, followed by two years of extended supervision. The plea agreement also involved returning the statue head which is being stored in the State Archive Preservation Facility. Clark was separately charged and convicted of arson in federal court related to the rioting in Madison and was sentenced to seven years in federal prison in 2021.

==== Restoration ====
On September 21, 2021, the statue was restored and added back to its pedestal at its original location, with a duplicate head copied from a version of the statue in Norway as a model. The statue was rededicated on Memorial Day, May 29, 2022 in a ceremony "based on a memorial dedication service from 1917 by the Grand Army of the Republic, which was the largest group of Union Civil War veterans at the time. The successors of the Grand Army of the Republic, the Sons of Union Veterans of the Civil War, will be involved in the event. Officials from the Madison Veterans Council and the Wisconsin Veterans Museum will also be on hand, and descendants of Col. Heg will also be flying in from across the country for the ceremony."

== See also ==
- List of monuments and memorials removed during the George Floyd protests
