= Thrane =

Thrane as a surname of Danish origin may refer to people:

- Josephine Thrane (1820–1862), Norwegian teacher and political activist
- Marcus Thrane (1817–1890), Norwegian author, journalist, and the leader of the first Norwegian labor movement
- Mathias Thrane (born 1993), Danish football player
- Morten Thrane Brünnich (1737–1827), Danish zoologist and mineralogist
- Morten Thrane Esmark (1801–1882), Norwegian priest and mineralogist
- Rasmus Thrane Hansen (born 1990), Danish orienteer
- Waldemar Thrane (1790–1828), Norwegian composer, violinist and conductor

== See also ==
- Thrane & Thrane a Danish Satellite Communications Company
