= Skandinaven =

American Norwegian-language newspaper

- Type: Newspaper
- Founders: John Anderson; Iver Lawson; Knud Langeland
- Founded: 1866
- Ceased publication: 1941
- Language: Norwegian
- Headquarters: Chicago, Illinois
- OCLC number: 9493902

Skandinaven was an American Norwegian-language newspaper published in Chicago from 1866 until 1941.

== Background ==
Skandinaven was established by three Norwegian immigrants: John Anderson (Knut Andersen Saue) and Iver Lawson (Iver Larsen Bøe) from Voss Municipality, Norway, and Knud Langeland from Samnanger Municipality, Norway. Langeland served as editor until 1881. Anderson administered the business side of the newspaper, while property developer Lawson rented premises and equipment.

In the fall of 1849, Langeland and his brother-in-law O. J. Hatlestad bought the printing press belonging to the weekly Nordlyset from Even Heg and James DeNoon Reymert. The newspaper continued on as Democraten, but ceased publication in 1851 due to poor economic viability.

John Anderson originally worked for Chicago Tribune. In 1866, he purchased the subscriber list of Norske-Amerikanerne, a struggling Norwegian-language newspaper, and established Skandinaven together with Langeland and Lawson.

For a time, Langeland and Lawson ran a competing newspaper, Amerika. The newspapers merged in 1873.

When Lawson died in 1872, his son Victor F. Lawson took over and eventually purchased Chicago's largest newspaper, Chicago Daily News.

== Operation ==
Starting in the 1870s, Skandinaven published a magazine featuring articles, stories, and poetry. Articles were provided by Norwegian American authors such as Hjalmar Hjorth Boyesen og Rasmus B. Anderson. Skandinaven became one of the most influential and successful newspapers in the Scandinavian immigrant community. The newspaper's progress allowed Anderson to form a publishing company which became the largest of its kind. In 1890 the company became a limited company under the name John Anderson Publishing Company.

Nicolay A. Grevstad served as editor of Skandinaven from 1892 until 1911 and again from 1931 until his death in 1940. After 1900 the company began to decline. The gradual assimilation of Norwegian immigrants into the broader American population resulted in a declining reader base. Anundsen Publishing Company from Decorah, Iowa, bought Skandinaven's subscriber list with the aim of merging it with that of the Norwegian-language Decorah Posten. The last issue of Skandinaven was published October 31, 1941.

When Skandinaven ceased publication, Reidar Rye Haugan established the Norwegian-language newspaper Viking in Chicago and worked as both its editor and publisher. In 1958, journalist Bertram Jensenius from Chicago took over Viking, and changed the newspaper's name to Vinland; he continued to published it until his death in 1976.
