= Ole C. Johnson =

19th century American politician

Ole Johnson
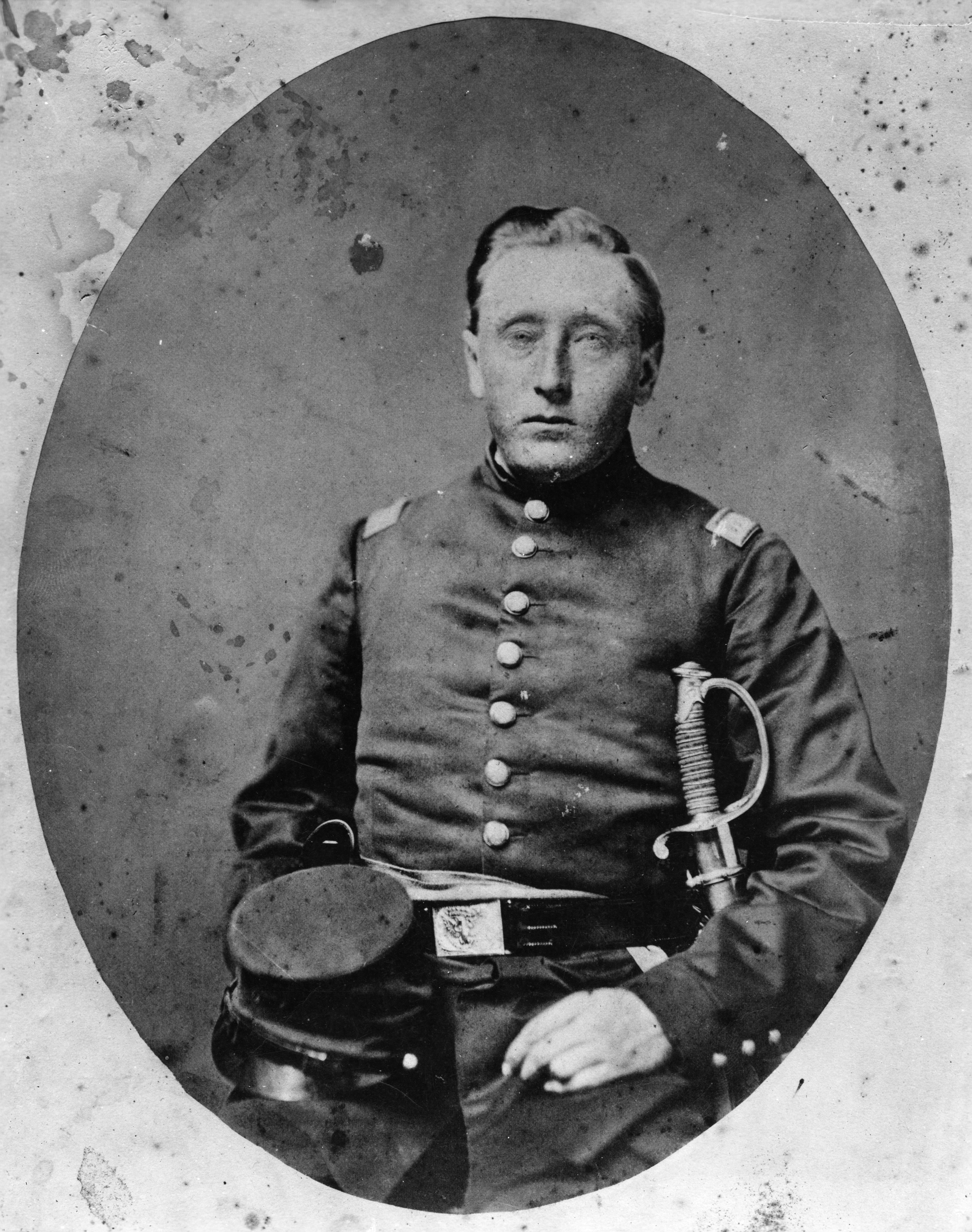
- Johnson in 1861

1st Immigration Commissioner of Wisconsin
- In office April 3, 1871 – December 31, 1873
- Governor: Lucius Fairchild; Cadwallader C. Washburn
- Preceded by: Position established
- Succeeded by: Martin J. Argard

17th Mayor of Beloit, Wisconsin
- In office April 1877 – April 1879
- Preceded by: C. F. G. Collins
- Succeeded by: John Hackett

Sergeant-at-Arms of the Wisconsin State Assembly
- In office January 12, 1870 – January 11, 1871
- Preceded by: R. C. Kelly
- Succeeded by: Sam Fifield

Personal details
- Born: February 23, 1838 Telemark, Sweden–Norway
- Died: November 4, 1886 (aged 48) Beloit, Wisconsin, U.S.
- Cause of death: Disease
- Resting place: Oakwood Cemetery, Beloit
- Party: Republican
- Spouse: Freia Caroline Bødtker (m. 1867–1886)
- Children: Wilford Chickamauga Johnson Shipnes; (b. 1869; died 1941)
- Relatives: John Anders Johnson (brother)
- Education: Beloit College

Military service
- Allegiance: United States
- Branch/service: United States Volunteers; Union Army
- Rank: Lt. Colonel, USV
- Commands: 15th Reg. Wis. Vol. Infantry
- Battles/wars: American Civil War: Battle of Island Number Ten (Cpt., Co. B); Battle of Perryville; Battle of Stones River (Maj.); Tullahoma campaign (Lt. Col.); Battle of Chickamauga (took command of regiment, POW); Battle of Jonesborough (commanding regiment)

Ole Carl Johnson Shipnes (February 23, 1838 – November 4, 1886) was a Norwegian American immigrant, businessman, Republican politician, and Wisconsin pioneer. He was the first immigration commissioner of Wisconsin, serving from 1871 through 1873, and was the 17th mayor of Beloit, Wisconsin (1877–1879). During the American Civil War, he served with the 15th Wisconsin Infantry Regiment (the "Scandinavian Regiment"), he was a prisoner of war for half a year before escaping and returning to the regiment, which he then led as lieutenant colonel.

For most of his career in America, he was known to use the surname "Johnson", but added the surname "Shipnes"—an Anglicization of his Norwegian birthplace—later in life.

== Early life ==
Ole Johnson was born on the Skipnes Farm, (Skibsnes), near Nordsjø, in Helgen Parish, Telemark, Norway. He came to the United States with his parents and four siblings, arriving in New York on board the Salvator, on July 6, 1844. The family went to Whitewater, Walworth County, Wisconsin. In 1852, they moved to Koshkonong, Wisconsin. Johnson studied law at Beloit College. He became a school teacher in Stoughton.

== Civil War ==
When the Civil War broke out, Johnson joined the Scandinavian Regiment (15th Wisconsin Infantry Regiment) and was appointed captain of Company B. After the Battle of Perryville, Johnson was promoted to the rank of major. He took part in the battle of Murfreesboro and reached the rank of lieutenant colonel in March 1863. The Scandavian Regiment was heavily mauled at the battle of Chickamauga with approximately 63% killed, wounded, or captured. Colonel Hans Christian Heg who had commanded the Regiment since its formation was killed and Johnson was captured.

Johnson was held in Libby Prison in Virginia before it was decided in May 1864 to move him to another prison. At Chesterville, Johnson and two others escaped from the railroad car they were being transported in. After a month, the men were able to rejoin the Union Army at Strawberry Plains, Tennessee. Johnson was promoted to colonel and took command of the Scandinavian Regiment on July 24, 1864, remaining with the regiment until the expiration of the regiment's service in February 1865.

== Post Civil War ==
After the war Johnson went into business and settled in Beloit, Rock County, Wisconsin, becoming active in the Republican Party. He became a partner in an agricultural instrument manufacturer in Beloit, called John Thompson & Co., which was his primary employment from 1870 to 1880. During that time, he was elected sergeant-at-arms of the Wisconsin State Assembly in 1870, and was then appointed the first state commissioner of immigration in 1871, by governor Lucius Fairchild. He served in that office until the end of 1873. He was then elected to two consecutive terms as mayor of Beloit, in 1877 and 1878. Later, he became president of the Watertown Bank.

== Personal life and family ==
Ole Johnson was one of at least four children born to Anders Johnson and his wife Aaste Bjørnsdatter. Ole's eldest brother was John Anders Johnson, who served as a member of the Wisconsin Senate and state Assembly, and was at one time the Democratic nominee for state Treasurer.

Ole Johnson married Freia Caroline Bødtker on January 3, 1867. They had one son, Wilford Chickamauga Johnson Shipnes. In his later years, Johnson had adopted the last name "Shipnes", the name of his place of birth in Norway.

Ole Johnson died in Beloit on November 4, 1886. His death was attributed to a stomach disease that he contracted during his time in Libby Prison.

Military offices
Preceded by Maj. Jurgen Wilson	Command of the 15th Wisconsin Infantry Regiment; July 24, 1864 – February 13, 1865	Regiment abolished
Wisconsin State Assembly
Preceded by R. C. Kelly	Sergeant-at-Arms of the Wisconsin State Assembly; January 12, 1870 – January 11, 1871	Succeeded by Sam Fifield
Political offices
Preceded by C. F. G. Collins	Mayor of Beloit, Wisconsin; April 1877 – April 1879	Succeeded by John Hackett
Government offices
New office established	Immigration Commissioner of Wisconsin; April 3, 1871 – December 31, 1873	Succeeded by Martin J. Argard
