= Sylvester Sivertson =

Norwegian journalist (1809–1847)

- Born: 3 September 1809; Lom, Christians amt, Norway
- Died: 6 December 1847 (aged 38); Drammen, Buskerud, Norway
- Burial place: Bragernes Church in Drammen
- Occupation: Journalist

Sylvester Sivertson (3 September 1809 – 6 December 1847) was a Norwegian journalist.

== Early life ==
Sylvester Sivertson was born on 3 September 1809 in Lom in Christians amt, Norway. Sylvester was the son of farmer, Syver Sylfæstssøn Hyrve (1778–1835), and Anne Olsdotter Hjeltar (1783–1837). Sivertson was the eldest of six siblings.

Sivertson moved to Trondheim at the age of 19 to study commerce.

== Journalism ==
From 1841 to December 1842, Sivertson was editor of the newly formed magazine Lillehammer Tilskuer. He left to become editor of Nordlyset in Trondheim. In July 1845, he became editor of Drammens Tidende.

Sivertson published Stortings-Efterretninger, which covered the workings of the Storting in 1836 and 1837.

Sivertson was the first director of the Norwegian Student Society.

== Retirement and death ==
Sivertson died on 6 December 1847 in Drammen, Buskerud, Norway. He was buried at Bragernes Church in Drammen.
