= Crawfish (disambiguation) =

Crawfish are a type of freshwater crustacean.

Crawfish may also refer to:

- "Crawfish" (song), a song
- Crawfish Creek (Wyoming), a short stream in Yellowstone National Park
- Crawfish Key, an island in Florida
- Crawfish Spring, a spring in Georgia
- Crawfish Interactive, a former video game developer
- Horse Creek (Kentucky), location of the Crawfish post office (as was, now called Hima) and river branch
