= Iver Lawson =

Iver Lawson may refer to:

- Iver Lawson (cyclist) (1879–1960), American cyclist
- Iver Lawson (publisher) (1821–1871), Norwegian-American real estate investor and newspaper publisher
