= Iver Lawson (publisher) =

American politician

Illinois State Representative from the 61st district
- In office 1869–1871 Serving with Edward S. Taylor
- Preceded by: Alexander F. Stevenson and George Strong
- Succeeded by: districts reapportioned after adoption of 1870 state constitution

Chicago Alderman from the 15th Ward
- In office 1864–1868
- Preceded by: James Conlan
- Succeeded by: John Herting

Chicago City Marshall
- In office March 6, 1860 – March 4, 1861
- Mayor: John Charles Haines; John Wentworth
- Preceded by: Jacob Rehm
- Succeeded by: Cyrus Parker Bradley (as 'General Superintendent of Police')

Personal details
- Born: Iver Larson Bø; December 21, 1821 Voss Municipality, Søndre Bergenhus, Norway
- Died: October 5, 1871 (aged 49)
- Occupation: Real estate investor and newspaper publisher

Skandinaven headquarters in Chicago c. 1890

Iver Lawson (December 21, 1821 – October 5, 1871) was a Norwegian-American real estate investor and newspaper publisher. Together with John Anderson and Knud Langeland, he was the founder of the Skandinaven newspaper in Chicago.

== Biography ==
Iver Lawson was born as Iver Larson Bø at Bø in Voss Municipality, Søndre Bergenhus county, Norway. He migrated to the United States in 1844 with his brother, Steffen Lawson. Two other siblings, Boarky Lawson and Knud Lawson, had migrated earlier.

Iver Lawson came to prosperity buying and selling real estate in Chicago during the mid-19th century. He entered city politics in the 1860s. He served as Chicago City Marshall in 1860 and 1861. He served as a member of the Chicago City Council, representing the 15th Ward from 1864 through 1868. He also served as a member of the Illinois House of Representatives from 1869 through 1871 representing the 61st district. Since Illinois had multi-member districts at the time, the district was also represented simultaneously by Edward S. Taylor.

Lawson was also one of the organizers of the First Lutheran church of Chicago in 1848.

Skandinaven was established by three Norwegian immigrants; John Anderson, Knud Langeland, and Iver Lawson. John Anderson administered the newspaper while Knud Langeland served as the first editor of Skandinaven. Iver Lawson was an investor and landlord who provided a location and facilities.

== Personal life ==
Lawson married Melinda Nordvig. They had two sons, Victor Fremont Lawson (1850-1925) and Iver Norman Lawson, Sr. (1865-1937) He died on October 5, 1871. After his death, his son, Victor Lawson, took over the administration of his father's estate, which included his real estate holdings and interest in Skandinaven.

== Related reading ==
- Strand, Algot E. (1905) A History of the Norwegians of Illinois (Chicago, Illinois: J. Anderson publishing Company)
- Dennis, Charles H. (1935) Victor Lawson, his time and work (Chicago, Illinois: The University of Chicago press)
