= Forward (statue) =

Sculpture by Jean Pond Miner Coburn

Coordinates: 43.0747°N 89.3858°W

Forward
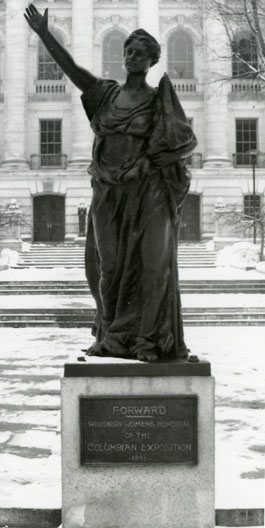
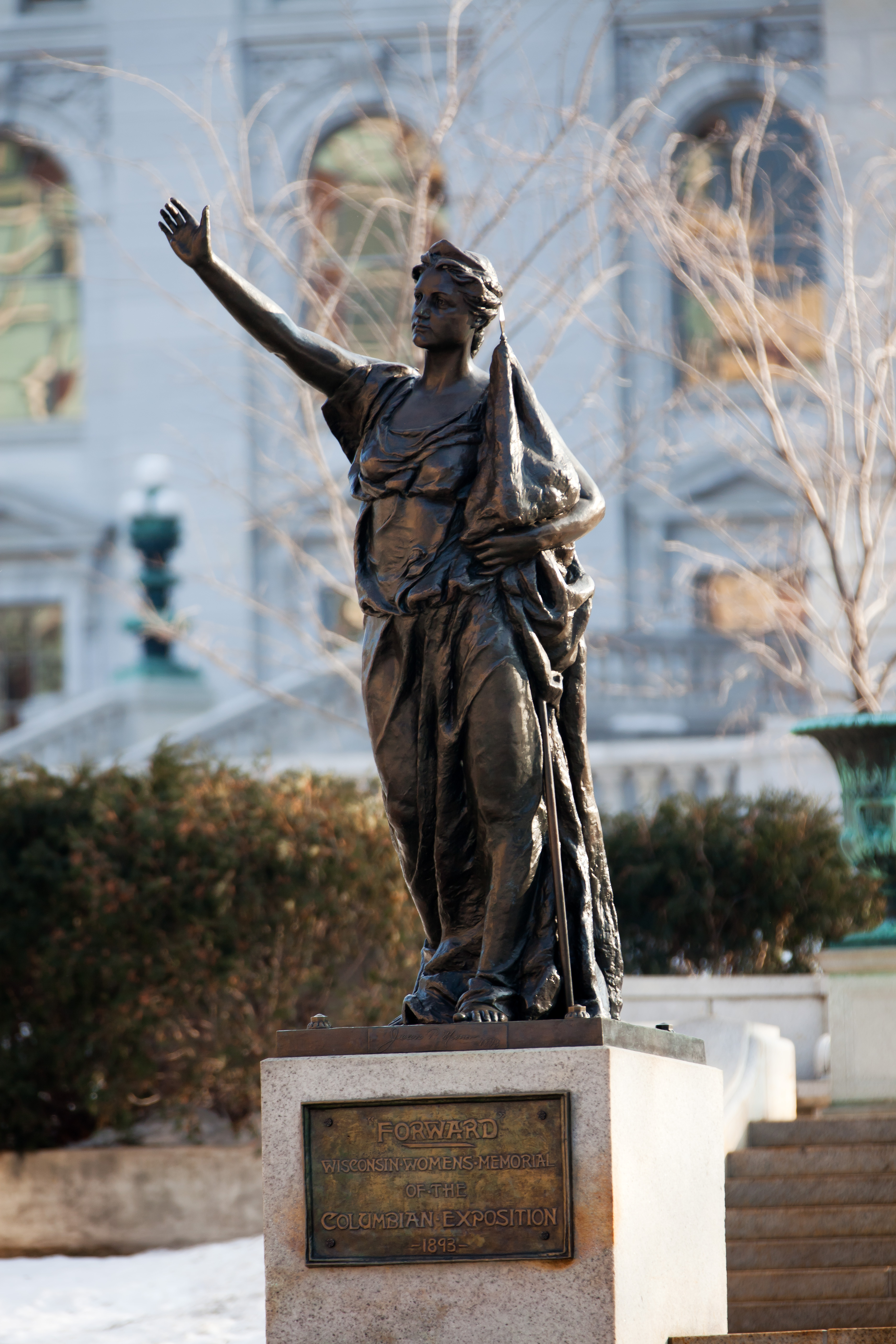
Original 1893 statue (left), 1996 replica (right)

Forward is an 1893 bronze statue by American sculptor Jean Pond Miner Coburn depicting an embodiment of Wisconsin's "Forward" motto. The 1996 replica is located at the Wisconsin State Capitol grounds at the top of State Street. The statue often is misidentified with the Wisconsin statue on top of the Capitol dome.

== History ==
During the 1893 World's Columbian Exposition, Miner and Helen Farnsworth Mears were named artists-in-residence at the Wisconsin Building. At that time, Miner was commissioned to create a work of art representing the state.

She created Forward; "Forward" is the motto of the state of Wisconsin. A souvenir pamphlet from the Exposition described the statue as representing "a female figure standing upon the prow of a boat, the figurehead of which is 'Old Abe.' The boat is surging through the water, and the figure, poised gracefully but firmly upon the prow, stretches forth the right hand, while the left clasps the American flag to its bosom." Miner had originally planned to cast it in copper, her funds ran out and the statue remained in its bronze form.

The statue was afterward purchased by women's suffrage organizations and "presented to the state of Wisconsin on behalf of the women's suffrage movement.

The statue was housed inside the Wisconsin State Capitol from 1893 to 1904. The sculpture was moved outdoors on the Capitol grounds in 1905. For a century the statue, made out of bronze, stood on the Wisconsin State Capitol grounds, slowly deteriorating. In 1996, several women's groups and "women of Wisconsin" raised the funds to have the work cast in bronze. This was placed on the Capitol grounds while the original was placed in the lobby of the Wisconsin Historical Society building on the campus of the University of Wisconsin–Madison.

=== 2020 replica vandalism ===
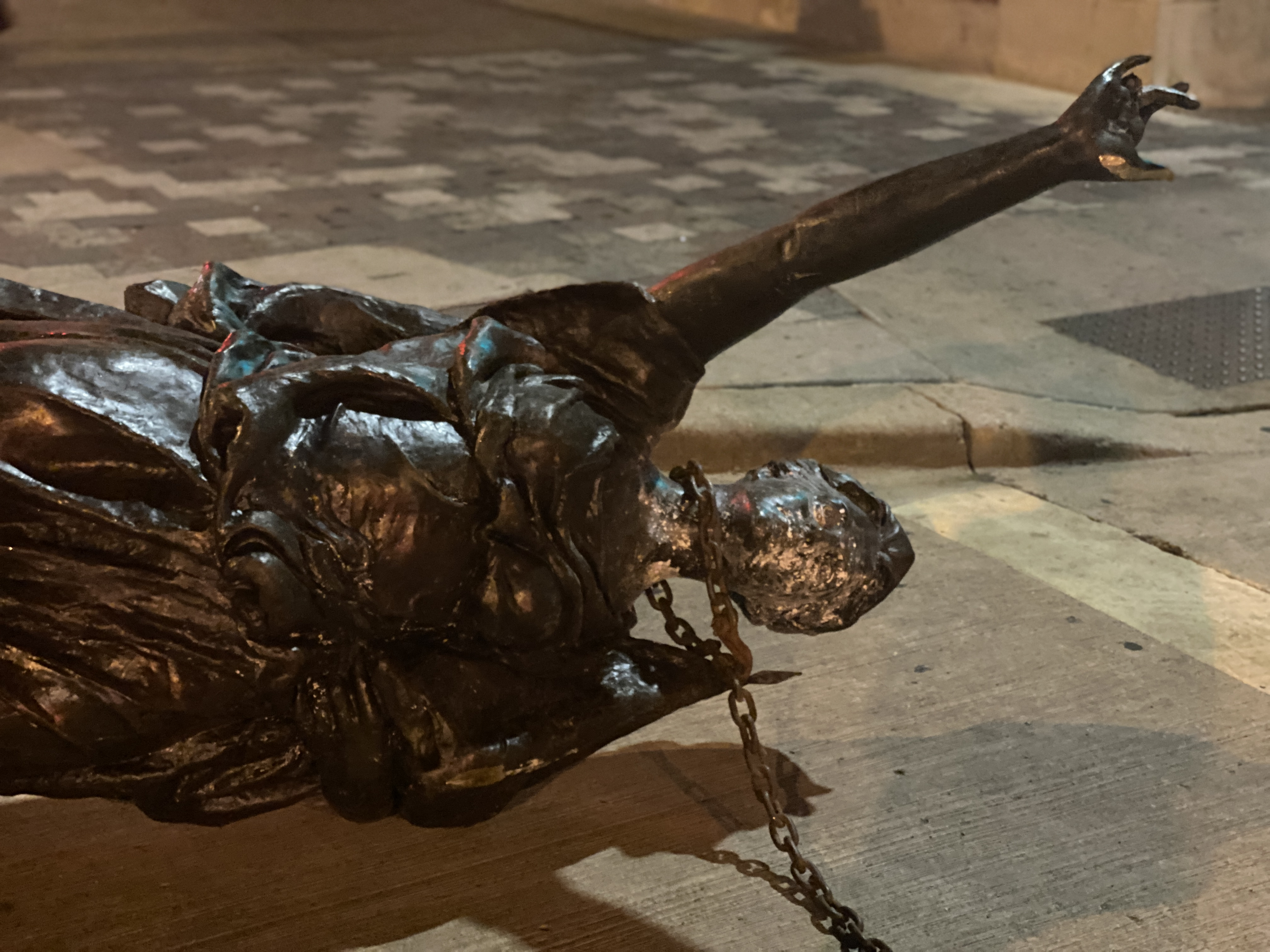
Replica statue toppled on June 23, 2020

On June 23, 2020, Forward (the replica) and a Hans Christian Heg statue were toppled by protesters following the arrest of a Black Lives Matter activist. The fall of the statue was characterized as a strategic political move by one of the protesters. Both statues were later recovered by the authorities, though Heg's statue lost a head and leg.

At a July 20, 2020 meeting of the Wisconsin Capitol and Executive Residence Board, the board voted unanimously to restore both Heg's statue and Forward to their original condition and placement atop their pedestals. The state of Wisconsin received a grant of $30,000 from the National Endowment for the Humanities the following October towards the expense of repairing of both the Heg and Forward statues. The statues were taken to Detroit where restoration was done by Venus Bronze Works Inc. The total cost of renovation was reported to be over $80,000, of which $60,000 was covered by federal grants. The repaired statues were reinstalled in September 2021.
