= Marcus Thrane =

Norwegian politician and journalist

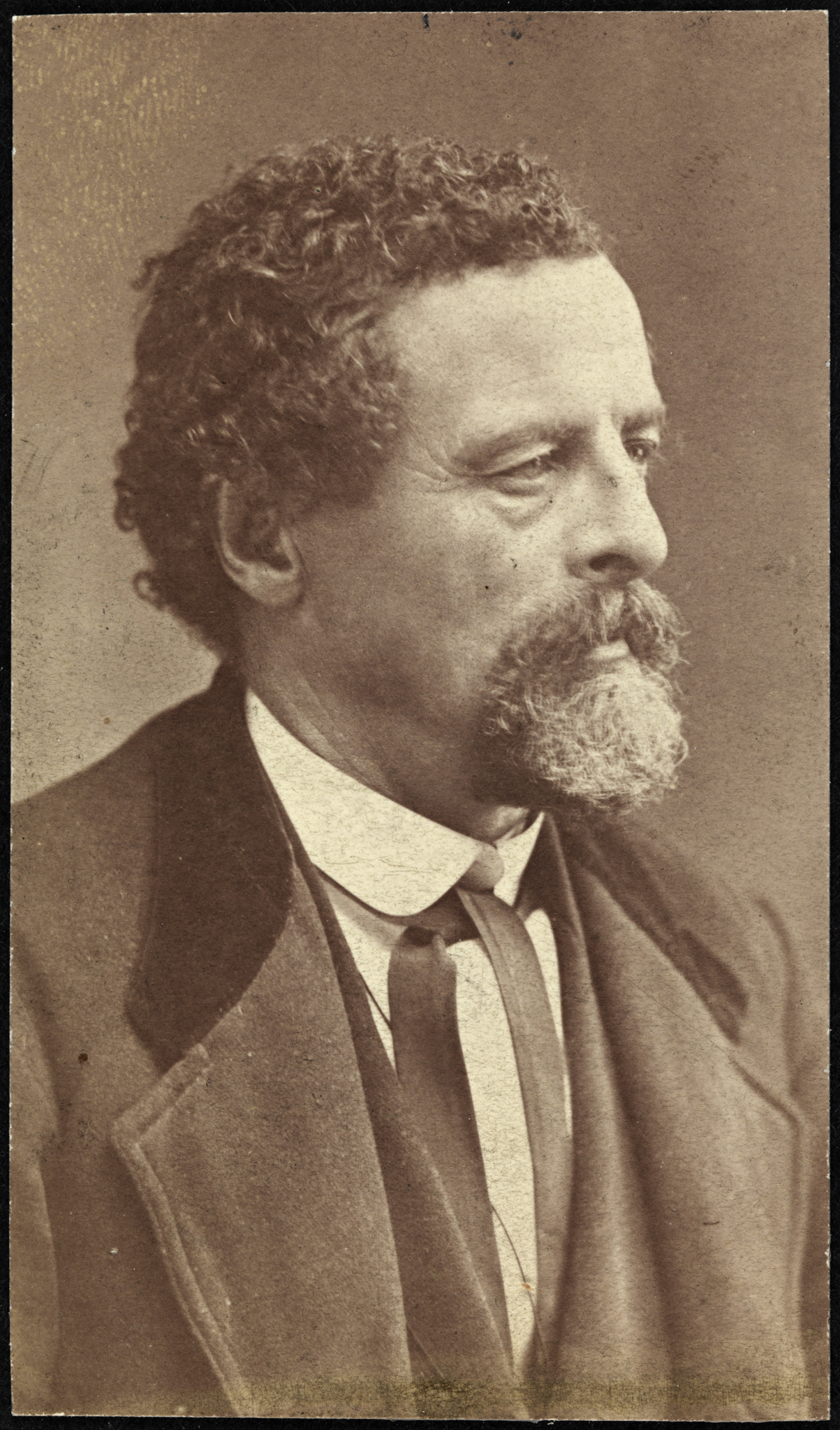
- Born: October 14, 1817; Christiania (now Oslo, Norway)
- Died: April 30, 1890 (aged 72); Eau Claire, Wisconsin, United States

Marcus Møller Thrane (14 October 1817 – 30 April 1890) was a Norwegian author, journalist, and the leader of the first labour movement in Norway. It was later known as the Thrane movement (Thranebevegelsen).

== Early life ==
Thrane was born in Christiania, now Oslo, in 1817. Shortly after his birth, his father, a merchant and managing director in Norges Rigsbank, was arrested for involvement in corruption, which devastated the family's reputation. At only 15, Thrane was orphaned and had to move in with friends of the family.

In 1837, Thrane left Norway and traveled to France through Germany and Switzerland. Thrane stayed in Paris for several months before returning to Norway in December 1837. After finishing the examen artium (university admission exam) in 1840 and a brief period as a student of theology, Thrane and his new wife, Maria Josephine Buch, moved to Lillehammer in 1841, where they ran a private school. In 1846, Thrane moved his teaching to Åsgårdstrand.

In March 1847, Thrane came to Åmot in Modum, where he began work as a teacher for the workers' children at the large industrial company, Blaafarveværket. It was there that he experienced his first political awakening. In April, the year after the company was experiencing difficulties, Thrane, together with 250 workers, was sacked.

The family then moved to Drammen, the hometown of his wife, where Thrane became the editor of the local newspaper Drammens Adresse, but because of his radical opinions, he was fired after only five months. He had already begun his political activities.

== Labour movement ==
On December 27, 1848, Thrane founded Drammens arbeiderforening (Drammen Labour Union) with 160 members. The following year, several other local unions joined a national organization, and Thrane printed the first edition of the union's paper, Arbeiderforeningernes Blad. In May 1850, the union delivered a petition to King King Oscar II of Sweden and the Norwegian Storting (parliament), which was signed by 13,000 members. The union asked for universal voting, the extension of mandatory military service to those with property, equality before the law, better schools, low or no border taxes on necessary goods, such as grains, and special support for poor farmers in the form of arable land on reasonable terms.

The union was primarily a union for agricultural workers and crofters and so it cannot be seen as a direct precedent for Norway's later labour movements.

In November, the government dismissed the petition. The union's national conference, in February 1851, sought a revolution. Although Thrane managed to stop it, the authorities seized the opportunity to have him arrested.

Thrane and 132 other members were sentenced on June 25, 1855. Thrane was sentenced to four years in prison, in addition to the four years that had already passed. The imprisonments and internal tension resulted in the end of the movement, and Thrane's attempts of revitalizing it after his release from prison were unsuccessful.

== Later life ==
After the collapse of the movement, Thrane became a photographer and when his wife died in 1862, he emigrated to the United States. He restarted his political activities among Scandinavian immigrants and continued his career as a journalist. In 1865, Thrane started the Chicago-based newspaper Norske-Amerikanerne. On May 2, 1866, John Anderson purchased the subscription lists of the foundering Norske-Amerikanerne to start the Norwegian-language newspaper Skandinaven.

In 1866, Thrane started a second Chicago newspaper, Dagslyset, which he published until 1878.

In 1866, the Norwegian Synod had felt sufficiently threatened to issue "A Warning to all Christians," which condemned his socialistic ideas, but the writings that he had put out in Chicago actually reached only a small number of fellow socialists. He published a satirical depiction of the visit of the Norwegian author Bjørnstjerne Bjørnson, which he called "The Old Wisconsin Bible" (Den gamle Wisconsin-bibelen). It was mainly directed against the church leaders in the Synod.

Among a number of more-or-less successful ventures in the United States, Thrane wrote and produced a number of plays for Norwegian-speaking audiences. The Norwegian Theater (Norske Teater) was established by Thrane in Chicago in September 1866. Many of its plays were written by Thrane.

In 1883, he returned to Norway for a brief visit and held a number of lectures but, disappointed by the moderate interest, he returned to the United States, where he died in 1890, in Eau Claire, Wisconsin.

Years later in 1949, Thrane's coffin was sent to Norway, where he was buried and remains today in Vår Frelsers Gravlund in Oslo.

== Legacy ==
Although his movement existed for only a few years, Thrane's work was an important contribution in the politicisation of the Norwegian worker. The Norwegian Labour Party (founded in 1887) refers to him as one of its founding fathers. Indeed, the Thrane movement united the rural and urban lower classes for a common cause for the first time in Norway.

Today, Thrane is remembered in Drammen, the city where he started Norway's first labour union, Drammen Arbeiderforening. On October 14, 2017, the city held a 200-year celebration for Thrane’s birthday. He is still recognized for his efforts and labor activism. A monument of him stands in his honor in Strømsø square.

== Sources ==
- Karen Larsen, A History of Norway (Princeton University Press: Princeton, New Jersey, 1949)
- Leiren, Terje I. Marcus Thrane: A Norwegian Radical in America (Norwegian-American Historical Association. 1987)
- Leiren, Terje I. Selected Plays of Marcus Thrane (New Directions in Scandinavian Studies. University of Washington Press. 2008)
- Oddvar, Bjørklund Marcus Thrane, Socialist leder i et Utland. (Oslo, Norway. 1970) Norwegian
- Koht, Halvdan Arbeider-rørsla av 1848 i Noreg (Norske Folkeskrifter Nr. 60. Norigs Ungdomslag og Studentmaallaget. Oslo [sic.] 1914)Norwegian
