= Norway Lutheran Church =

Historic church in Minnesota, United States

- U.S. National Register of Historic Places
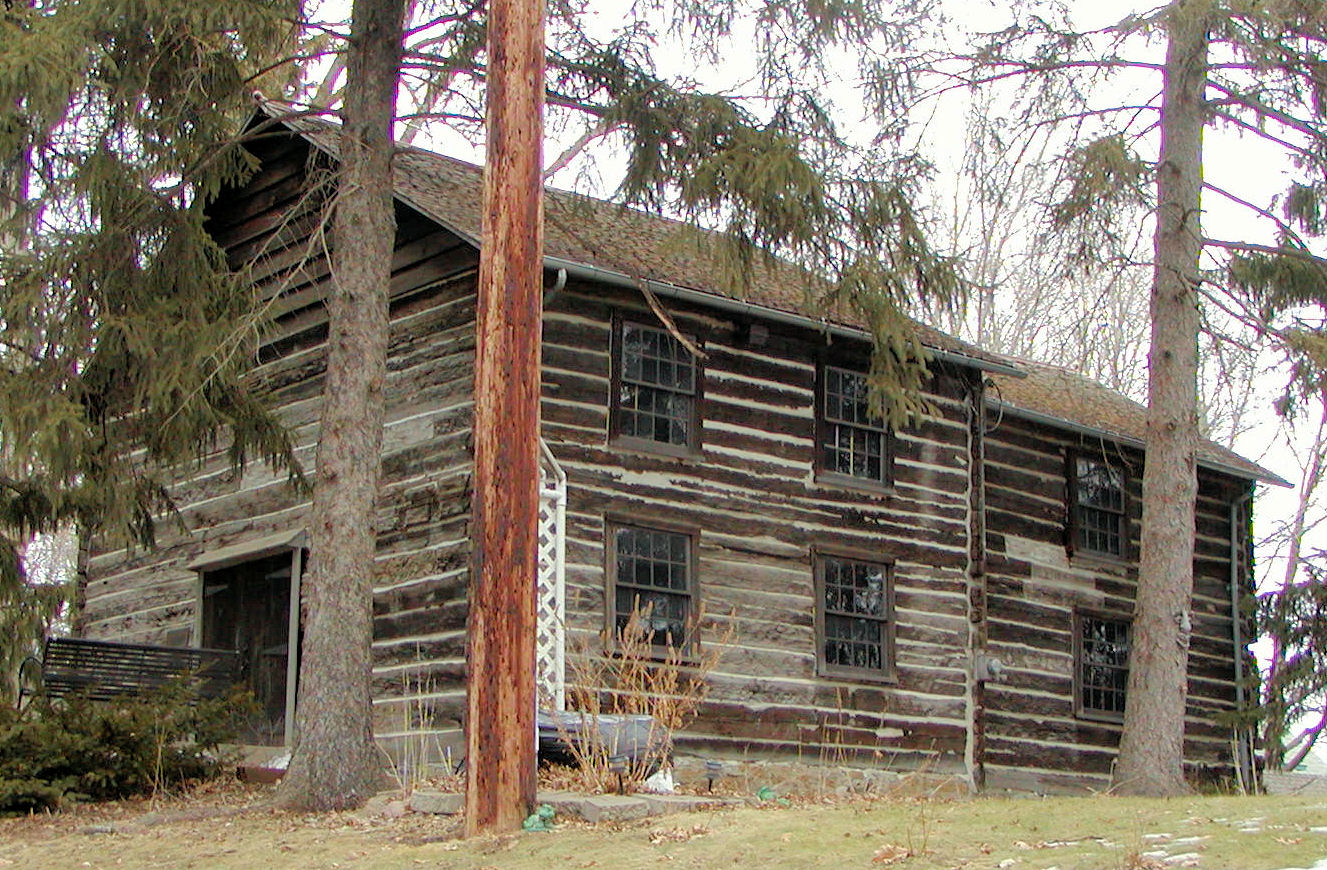

- Location within Minnesota Location within the United States
- Location: 2375 Como Avenue West; Saint Paul, Minnesota
- Coordinates: 44°59′3.5″N 93°11′42″W
- Built: 1843
- Architect: Peter Jacobson
- NRHP reference No.: 75001013
- Added to NRHP: May 12, 1975

The Norway Lutheran Church or Old Muskego Church stands on the edge of the campus of Luther Seminary in Saint Paul, Minnesota.

== History ==
Old Muskego Church was erected by Norwegian-American Lutherans near Waterford in the Wind Lake area of Racine County, Wisconsin in 1844, four years before Wisconsin became a state. It was originally built in the Muskego Settlement near Muskego, Wisconsin, by Norwegian immigrant settlers.

Even Hansen Heg (1789 - 1850), father of Civil War Hero Hans Christian Heg, donated the land on which the original church was built. Within the first year of construction, the congregation called pioneer Lutheran minister Claus Lauritz Clausen, to serve as the first minister. Clausen would be followed by Hans Gerhard, future Bishop of the Norwegian Lutheran Church in America. The congregation made use of the facility for 25 years, replacing the building with a new church in 1869.

Principally through the efforts of historian, Hjalmar Holand, the Old Muskego Church was purchased, taken apart, moved and re-assembled in Saint Paul, Minnesota in 1904. The Minnesota Historical Society dedicated the church a State Historical Site in 1963. It is now listed on the National Register of Historic Places.

== Other sources ==
- Nord, Mary Ann (2003) The National Register of Historic Places in Minnesota (Minnesota Historical Society) ISBN 0-87351-448-3
