= Jean Miner Coburn =

American sculptor (1866–1967)

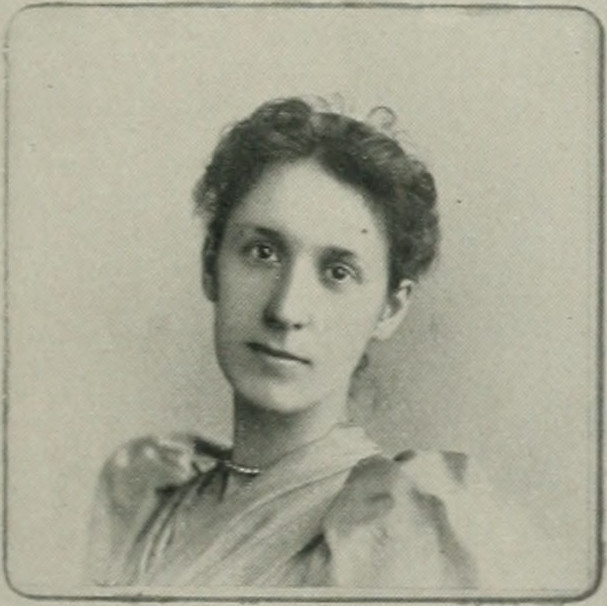
- Jean Pond Miner Coburn from A Woman of the Century (1893)
- Born: Jean Pond Miner; 8 July 1865 (Note: (Willard & Livermore 1893, p. 509) claims the birth year to be 1866, while more recent sources give 1865.); Menasha, Wisconsin
- Died: 16 March 1967 (aged 101)
- Education: Lorado Taft, Art Institute of Chicago
- Known for: Sculpture
- Notable work: Forward, bronze statue in front of the Wisconsin State Capitol

Jean Pond Miner Coburn (Note: In this article, the surname is Miner Coburn.) (1865–1967) was born in Menasha, Wisconsin. She studied at the Art Institute of Chicago, and is most notable for her 1893 work Forward.

== Early life ==
Jean Pond Miner was born in Menasha, Wisconsin, on July 8, 1866. Her parents were Rev. H. A. Miner, a Congregationalist clergyman and Harriet Pond Rice. In her early life the family moved to Madison, Wisconsin. During her education she was known among her classmates as a strong artist. After two years as a special student in Downer College, she went to Chicago and began her art studies at the Art Institute of Chicago with Lorado Taft, where she found particular interest in sculpture. After working only three months she took the second honors of the institution. Soon after, she was sought as an instructor, and at the end of the year accepted a position as student teacher.

== Work ==
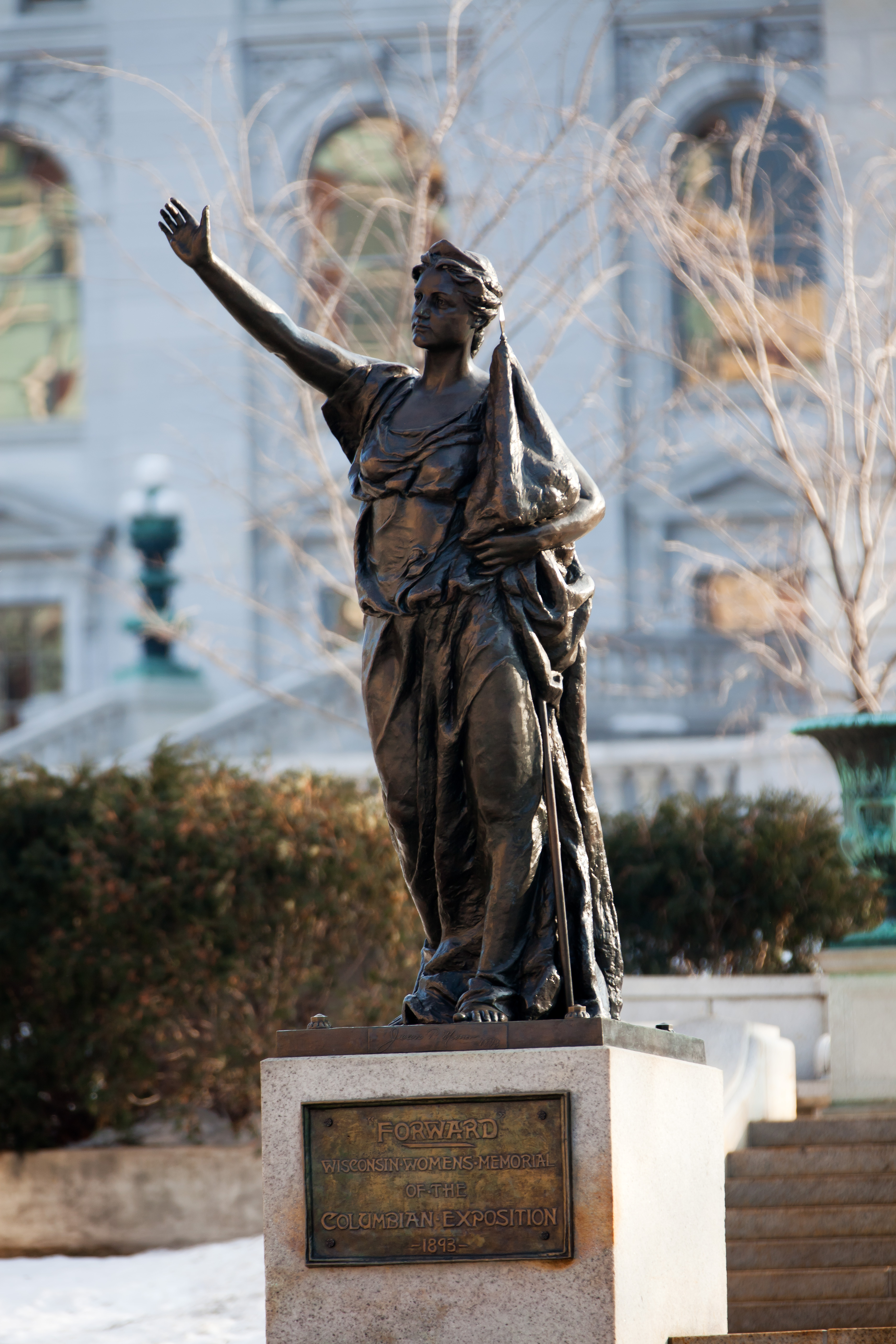
Replica of Coburn's 1893 Forward statue in Madison, Wisconsin (original moved in 1996 for preservation)

Her statue Hope was among the first that met with recognition and was placed in the McCowen Oral School, in Englewood, Chicago. The woman's art club (also known as The Palette Club) recognized her work and conferred upon her the honor of active membership, and her figure Wisconsin was locally celebrated. Her group especially prepared for the 1893 World's Columbian Exposition was called Leave-Taking.

During the Exposition, Miner and Helen Farnsworth Mears were both named artists-in-residence at the Wisconsin Building. At that time, Miner was commissioned to create a work of art representing the state. The result was her most famous work, Forward, which was later given the honor of a prominent position at the Wisconsin State Capitol.

== Personal life ==
Jean Pond Miner married lawyer Alonzo John Coburn in 1896. The couple had one child, Miner Thompson Coburn.
