= Reidar Rye Haugan =

American dramatist

Reidar Rye Haugan (September 18, 1893 – October 1972) was an American newspaper editor and publisher.

== Background ==
Reidar Rye Haugan was born the youngest of eight children born in Trondheim, Norway. Together with his mother and sister, Haugan immigrated to the United States at 21 years of age, arriving in New York City on April 3, 1915.

== Career ==
Initially Haugan had worked for the editorial staff of the Norwegian-language newspaper Skandinaven in Chicago. Dating from 1866, Skandinaven was once one of the largest Norwegian language-newspapers in the United States. In 1939, Haugan followed Nicolai A. Grevstad as editor of Skandinaven. When Skandinaven suspended publication in 1941, Haugan established the Norwegian-language newspaper Viking, at which he served as both editor and publisher. In 1958, Norwegian-American journalist and author Bertram Jensenius (1898–1976), who came to the United States in 1922, took over Viking, renamed it Vinland and published it until his death in 1976.

Haugan was also a director and playwright. In 1944, the Chicago Norwegian Theatre (Norske Teater) presented one of his more famous works, Norway Waits (Norge Venter). Together with his wife Hermana Rye Haugan, he was a leader of American Relief for Norway in Chicago, which provided assistance to the nation and people of Norway during and after World War II.

== Sources ==
- Hustvedt, Lloyd. (2001) Guide to the Archives of the Norwegian-American Historic Association (Norwegian-American Historical Association, Northfield, MN. 6/1/1979)
