= 15th Wisconsin Infantry Regiment =

Union Army infantry regiment

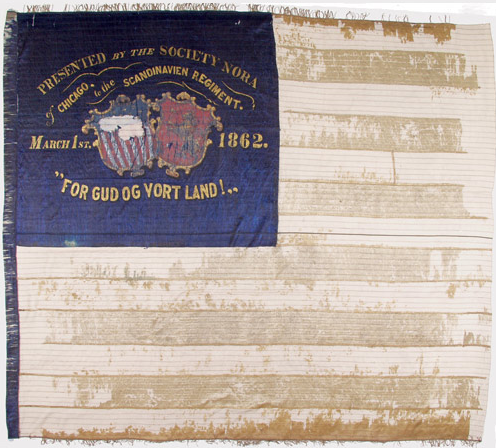
- National flag of the 15th Wisconsin Volunteer Infantry Regiment from the Vesterheim Norwegian-American Museum
- Active: February 14, 1862 – February 13, 1865
- Country: United States
- Allegiance: Union
- Branch: Union Army
- Role: Infantry
- Size: Regiment
- Nickname: Scandinavian Regiment
- Mottos: For Gud og Vårt Land! (For God and Our Country!)
- Engagements: American Civil War: Battle of Island Number Ten; Battle of Perryville; Battle of Stones River; Tullahoma Campaign; Battle of Chickamauga; Battle of Resaca; Battle of Peachtree Creek; Battle of Atlanta; Battle of Jonesborough

Commanders
- Colonel: Hans Christian Heg
- Major: Jurgen Wilson
- Lt. Col.: Ole C. Johnson

The 15th Wisconsin Infantry Regiment was a volunteer infantry regiment that served in the Union Army during the American Civil War. It was popularly known as the Norwegian Regiment or the Scandinavian Regiment, due to its composition of mostly Norwegian American, Swedish American, and Danish American immigrants.

== Service ==
The 15th Wisconsin Infantry Regiment was originally formed by Col. Hans Christian Heg at Camp Randall, near Madison, Wisconsin. The majority of its members were Norwegian immigrants with the rest being mainly Swedish and Danish immigrants. The regiment was organized at Madison, Wisconsin, and mustered into federal service January 31, 1862. The regiment was mustered out of service by company between December 1, 1864, and February 13, 1865.

15th Wisconsin Company Organization
Company	Earliest Moniker	Primary Place of Recruitment	Company Commander
A	St. Olaf's Guards	Chicago, Illinois and Boone County, Illinois	Andrew Torkildson
B	Wergeland Guards	Dane County	Ole C. Johnson
C	Norway Bear Hunters	Racine County	F. B. Berg
D	Wolf Hunters	Waukesha County	C. Campbell
E	Odin's Guards	Dane County	J. Ingmundsen
F	K.K.'s Protectors	Manitowoc County	Charles Gustavson
G	Rock River Rangers	Rock County	John J. Gordon
H	Heg's Rifles	Dane County, Wisconsin and Clermont, Fayette Counties from Iowa	K. J. Sime
I	Scandinavian Mountaineers	Waupaca County and Pepin County	A. Gaassman
K		Freeborn County, Minnesota, Winneshiek County, Iowa, Worth County, Iowa, and Fillmore County, Minnesota	Mons Grinager

== Major campaigns ==
The 15th Wisconsin Volunteer Regiment was a participant in a number of major battles conducted by the Union Army during the Civil War.

- The Battle of Island Number Ten
- The Battle of Perryville (October 8, 1862)
- The Battle of Stones River (December 31, 1862 - January 2, 1863)
- The Tullahoma Campaign (June 24 - July 3, 1863)
- Battle of Chickamauga (September 19 – 20, 1863)
- Battle of Resaca (May 13–15, 1864)
- The Battle of Peachtree Creek (July 20, 1864)
- Battle of Atlanta (July 22 - August 25. 1864)
- Battle of Jonesborough (August 31 – September 1, 1864)

== Casualties ==
The 15th Wisconsin suffered eight officers and 86 enlisted men who were killed in action or who later died of their wounds, plus another one officer and 241 enlisted men who died of disease, for a total of 336 fatalities. On September 20, 1863, Colonel Hans Christian Heg died of wounds he received in action in the Battle of Chickamauga on September 19, 1863.

== Commanders ==
- Colonel Hans Christian Heg (February 14, 1862 – September 20, 1863) died of wounds after Chickamauga. Before the war, he had served as the 6th prison commissioner of Wisconsin.
- Major Jurgen Wilson (September 20, 1863 – July 24, 1864) commanded the regiment after many senior officers were killed or captured at Chickamauga. Earlier in the war, he had been captain of Co. H. He was also wounded at Chickamauga. He received an honorary brevet to lieutenant colonel after the war.
- Lt. Colonel Ole C. Johnson (July 24, 1864 – February 10, 1865) was captured at Chickamauga and was prisoner of war until making his escape in May 1864. He commanded the regiment through the end of the war and was designated for promotion to colonel, but was never mustered at that rank. Earlier in the war, he had been captain of Co. B. After the war he became mayor of Beloit, Wisconsin, and immigration commissioner of Wisconsin.

== Notable people ==
- Hans Borchsenius was adjutant of the regiment for one year. He resigned due to illness. He later served as a Wisconsin state legislator, and served several appointed roles in the Internal Revenue Service.
- Claus Lauritz Clausen was chaplain of the regiment for one year. Before the war he had served in the Iowa state legislature. After the war he was a prominent religious leader in the Scandinavian American Lutheran community.
- David McKee was lieutenant colonel of the regiment and died at the Battle of Stones River. Earlier in the war, he had been captain of Co. C in the 2nd Wisconsin Infantry Regiment.
- John T. Rice was first lieutenant and later captain of Co. C, serving nearly the entire war. After the war he served as a Wisconsin state legislator.
- Otto A. Risum was enlisted in Co. G and rose to the rank of sergeant. He was later promoted to sergeant major and then adjutant, serving through the entire war. After the war he served as a Wisconsin state legislator.
- Svend Samuelson was 2nd lieutenant of Co. F and resigned due to illness in November 1863. He later served as a Wisconsin state legislator.
- Victor Willard was enlisted in Co. C, but was discharged after a year due to disability. He previously served as a Wisconsin state senator.

== See also ==
- List of Wisconsin Civil War units
- Wisconsin in the American Civil War
- Hans Mattson
- Charles J. Stolbrand
- Oscar Malmborg
- Ernst von Vegesack
