= Josephine Thrane =

Norwegian teacher and political activist

- Born: Maria Josephine Buch; 5 April 1820; Bragernes
- Died: 30 September 1862 (aged 42)
- Occupations: Schoolteacher and political activist
- Spouse: Marcus Thrane

Maria Josephine Thrane (née Buch; 5 April 1820 – 30 September 1862) was a Norwegian teacher and political activist.

Maria Josephine Buch was born in the Bragernes neighborhood of Drammen, Norway. She was the daughter of Johann Herman Krefting Buch (1776–1838) and Johanne Frideriche Falster (1781–1828). In 1841, she was married to Marcus Thrane. They settled in Lillehammer where she had been working as a governess. From 1841 to 1846 they were running a private school for boys and girls. From 1854, she worked for the periodical Arbeider-Foreningernes Blad, which her husband had started in 1849.

Her husband was the leader of the first Norwegian labor movement. During the time, when her husband was imprisoned as a labor agitator (1855–1858), she worked hard to get him pardoned. She was also editor of Arbeider-Foreningernes Blad during this period. She suffered from both cholera and tuberculosis and died in Christiania (now Oslo) in 1862 at the age of 42.
