= Nordlyset =

Norwegian-American newspaper

Nordlyset (lit. 'The Northern Light') was the first in a series of Norwegian-American newspapers published by the Norwegian immigrant community in the United States. The first issue was published on St. Olaf's Day (July 29) 1847 in the Muskego Settlement in the Wisconsin Territory. The editor of the newspaper was James DeNoon Reymert, an immigrant from Farsund, and the newspaper was printed in Even Hansen Heg's (1790–1850) cabin. The newspaper promoted new American values, such as freedom and equality. Many of its articles argued that the freedom of Norwegian expatriates was far greater in the United States, and that this was the main reason why many had emigrated from Norway. In 1850, the newspaper was purchased by Knud Langeland, who changed its name to Democraten (The Democrat).

Nordlyset was a strong opponent of slavery and actively supported the Free Soil Party.
