= George Wilson (major) =

American Civil War officer (1836–1897)

George Wilson (a.k.a. Georg Wilson and Jurgen Wilson; December 18, 1836 – April 20, 1897) was a German-born Union Army officer during the American Civil War, serving with the Scandinavian Regiment.

== Early life ==
Born to an English father and German mother in Hamburg, Germany, Wilson lived in Kristiania, Norway (now Oslo), for a time before emigrating to the United States in 1858. Having settled in Madison, Wisconsin, Wilson worked as a store clerk for a year before traveling to New Orleans in December 1859, where he became a sailor. He lived in Chicago for a time, before returning to Madison at the start of the Civil War in 1861, enlisting in the Scandinavian Regiment.

== Military career ==
As a second lieutenant in Company B, Wilson first saw action at the Union raid on Union City, Tennessee, and, in May 1862, was made a full lieutenant following the campaigns of Tennessee, Mississippi, and Alabama. In command of Company H during the Battle of Chaplin Hills, Wilson was later wounded at the Battle of Murfreesboro.

Promoted to the rank of major soon after returning to duty, Wilson was severely wounded, shot three times during the Battle of Chickamauga. After recuperating in Wisconsin (during which time he married Mary Madson, 1843–1903), Wilson returned in November 1863 as acting commanding officer of the Scandinavian Regiment during the Battle of Rocky Face Ridge, Resaca and Pickett's Mill (during which the regiment suffered particularly heavy casualties) before turning command over to Col. Ole Johnson in July 1864. Wilson remained with the regiment, serving in an additional 26 military engagements, until the war's end in 1865.

== Later years ==
Becoming a successful businessman in La Crosse County, Wisconsin, following the war, Wilson began a bank and steamship business under Wilson & Jurgens, as well as a partnership in a meat salting company.

In 1874, during a family vacation in Europe, Wilson rescued a drowning woman after she fell overboard from a steamship off the coast of Norway.

Wilson's business failed, and he was forced to sell his shares in 1878. He later worked as a traveling salesman for a wholesale clothing firm in Chicago.

He moved to Grand Forks, North Dakota, in 1882 and, three years later, he was one of several of veterans commissioned by Wisconsin Gov. Rusk to write on the history of Wisconsin's Civil War regiments.

Wilson died in Madison, Wisconsin in 1897.

== See also ==
- German Americans in the Civil War
