= Muskego Settlement, Wisconsin =

Norwegian-American settlement in Wisconsin, United States

Coordinates: 42.76306°N 88.21417°W

Muskego Settlement
- Norwegian-American pioneer settlement
- Interactive map of Muskego Settlement
- Country: United States
- State: Wisconsin
- Counties: Waukesha and Racine
- Founded: 1839
- Founder: John Nielsen Luraas

Area
  - Total: 1.0 sq mi (2.6 km^{2})

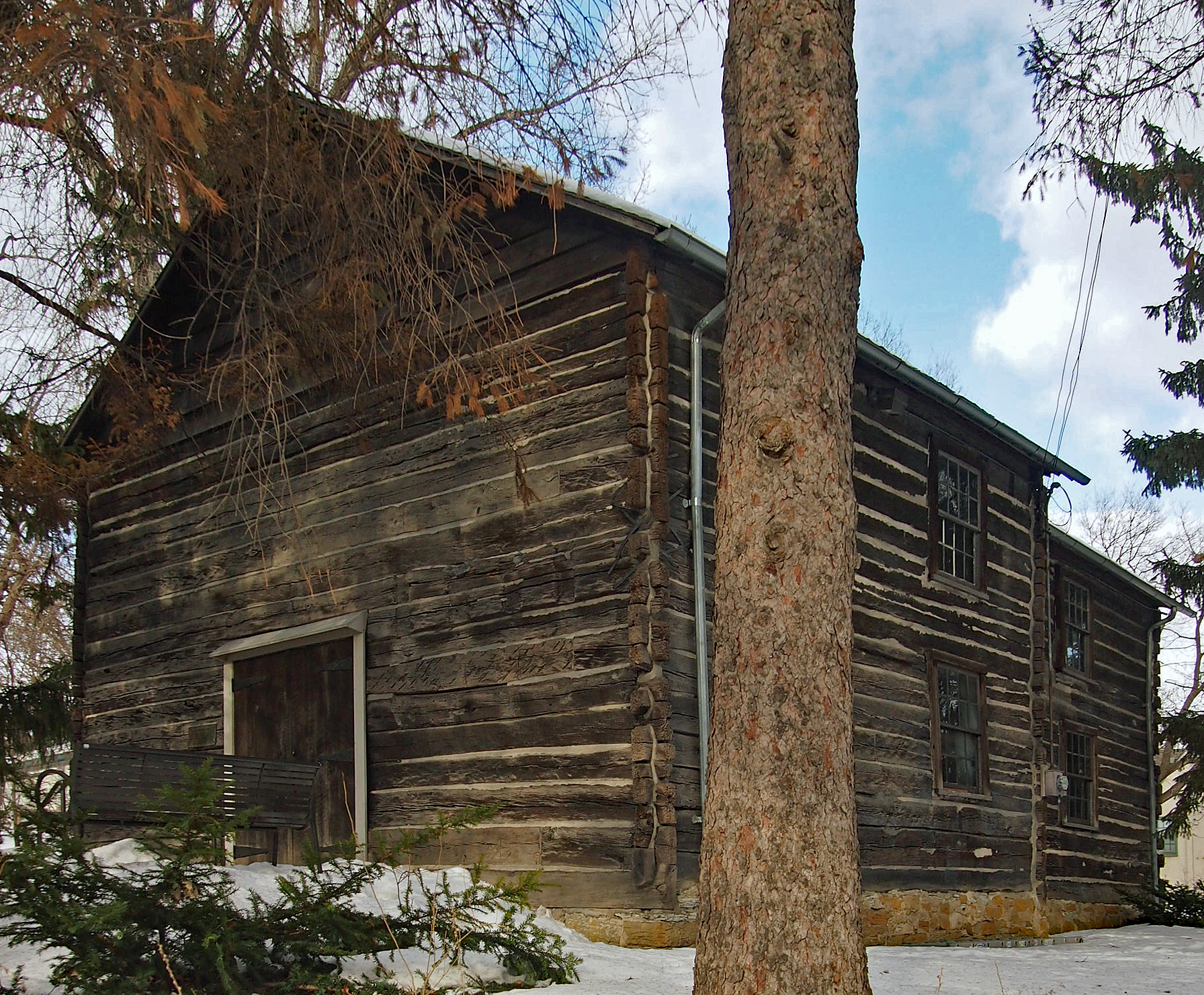
Muskego Settlement's original Norway Lutheran Church, since moved to Saint Paul, Minnesota

Old Muskego Historical Marker, Waterford, Wisconsin, 1963.

The Muskego Settlement was one of the first Norwegian-American settlements in the United States. Situated near today's Muskego, Wisconsin, the Muskego Settlement covered areas within what is now the town of Norway in Racine County, Wisconsin.

== History ==
John Nielsen Luraas (1813–1890) first led the colony which was founded in 1839, primarily by immigrants from the Norwegian county of Telemark. They had been encouraged to seek their fortunes in Wisconsin by the pioneer Nattestad brothers. Ansten and Ole Knudsen Nattestad had immigrated during 1838 from Veggli in Numedal, Norway, to establish the first Norwegian-American immigrant community in Wisconsin at Jefferson Prairie Settlement of Rock County.

The party staked out 640 acres (2.6 km^{2}) in two sections in Waukesha County. The following year two other settlers, Søren Tollefsen Bache (1814–1890) and Johannes Johannsen, settled in an adjacent area in Racine County, just south of the first settlement, in what is now the town of Norway, Wisconsin. The Muskego Settlement thus came to straddle the county border.

Johannes Johannsen and Søren Bache both played important roles in the life of this colony. It was Johannes Johansen who drafted the Muskego Manifesto of 1845, an open letter by the Muskego colonists to the people of Norway, answering the anti-emigration propaganda of the Norwegian government. The Muskego Manifesto was published in the Norwegian newspaper Morgenbladet in Christiania on April 1, 1845. Johansen died less than a year after writing this manifesto.

Søren Bache remained prominent in the affairs of Muskego for several years. He served as one of the founders of Nordlyset, the first Norwegian-language newspaper published in the United States, and was the author of a remarkable pioneer diary. Søren Bache returned to Norway in 1847. Bache settled in Lier, Norway, where he died in 1890.

Even Hansen Heg (1790–1850) was among a number of other immigrants who soon followed. In Drammen, Norway, Heg had been the owner and operator of a hotel. Even Heg established a transit center of sorts for immigrants. The Heg barn was erected at Muskego during 1843. This barn, the first home in America for many Norwegian immigrant, became a social and religious center in the frontier area. His spacious barn played a prominent part in the early history of the settlement, both as an assembly place and as a social and religious center for the Muskego community of Norwegian immigrants.

Claus Lauritz Clausen arrived during 1843, becoming the pastor in the Muskego settlement. He organized the first Norwegian Lutheran Church in America congregation that came out of the Norwegian state-church tradition within the Muskego Settlement. Clausen also organized and served as pastor of several nearby Lutheran churches.

Elling Eielsen, who had immigrated to the United States during 1839, had first arrived at Muskego prior to moving to the Jefferson Prairie Settlement. Eielsen was a resident Lutheran pastor in the Haugean tradition at Jefferson Prairie from 1846 to 1872. Evangelical Lutheran Church in America (Eielsen Synod) founded in 1846 at the Jefferson Prairie Settlement, was to bear his name.

James DeNoon Reymert, who had immigrated to the United States during 1842, settled in the Muskego Settlement in 1847. Reymert, Even Hansen Heg and Søren Bache agreed to start the Norwegian language newspaper Nordlyset. Reymert continued to serve as editor the paper until 1850, when it was sold and was moved to Racine, Wisconsin.

Swamp fever, ague, and malaria plagued the early settlers at Muskego. The settlement was afflicted by cholera at least twice, in 1849 and 1851. Ultimately, the original settlement site was abandoned, and the settlers relocated principally to other locations in southern Wisconsin. In 1904 the United Norwegian Lutheran Church arranged to have the settlement's original meeting house, the 1843 Norway Lutheran Church, dismantled, moved, and reassembled on the campus of Luther Seminary in Saint Paul, Minnesota.

The State of Wisconsin erected a Historic Marker during 1963 to commemorate the Muskego Settlement. It is located at the entrance to Norway Evangelical Lutheran Church, across from Heg Park, on Wisconsin Highway 36 in Wind Lake, Wisconsin. The inscription of the plaque acknowledges the leadership of John Luraas, Even Hansen Heg, Johannes Johannsen, Søren Bache, Elling Eielsen, Claus Lauritz Clausen and James DeNoon Reymert.

== Other sources ==
- A Chronicle of Old Muskego: The Diary of Søren Bache, 1839–1847 (translated and edited by Clarence A. Clausen and Andreas Elviken. Norwegian-American Historical Association. Northfield, MN. 1951)
- Muskego: Then and Now (Ringerike-Drammen District Lag. Volume 23, Number 2. May 2008)
- Blegen, Theodore C. (1940) Norwegian Migration to America, 1825–1860 (Northfield, MN: Norwegian-American Historical Association)
- Barton, A. O. The Old Muskego Settlement ( Waukesha Freeman. September 7, 1916)
- Ulvestad, Martin Nordmaendene i Amerika: Deres Historie og Rekord (translated by Olaf Kringhaug. 1907)
