= Crawfish Spring =

Body of water in Georgia, US

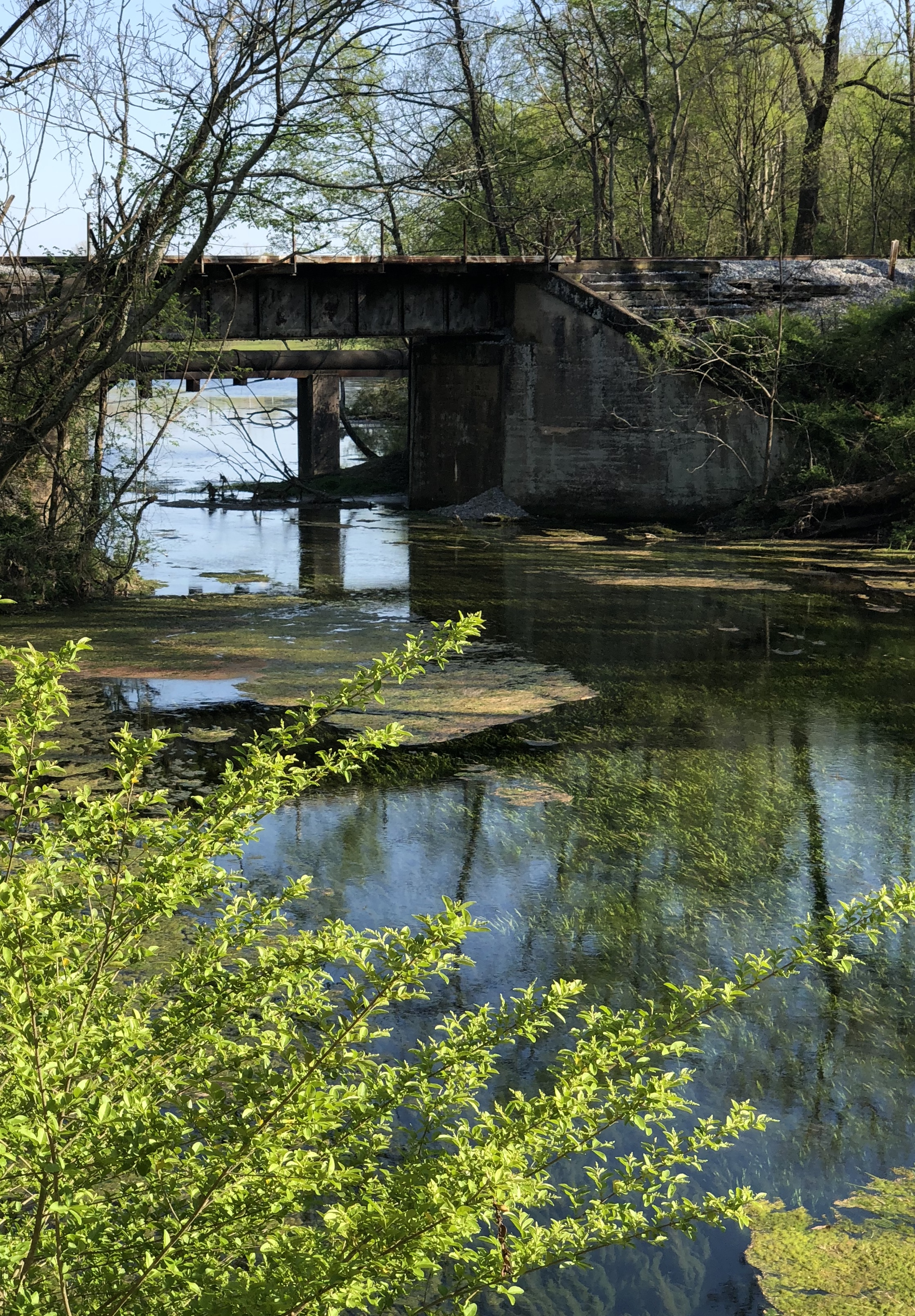

- Location within Georgia
- Location: Walker County, Georgia
- Coordinates: 34°52′13″N 85°17′33″W
- Primary outflows: Blue Hole / Chickamauga Creek
- Catchment area: Missionary Ridge
- Basin countries: United States
- Surface elevation: 718 ft (219 m)

Crawfish Spring is a body of water in Walker County, Georgia, on the east side of Cove Road in Chickamauga. The spring was named for Chief Crawfish of the Cherokee.

== History ==
=== Native Americans ===
After the period of the Mississippian mound builders, the area around Crawfish Spring passed into control of the Cherokee. Under pressure from the encroachment of white settlers, around 1800, the Cherokee nation divided into eight districts, one of which was the Chickamauga District, which included Crawfish Spring. According to Frederick Ufford, director of the Walker County Regional Heritage Museum and Civil War Center in Chickamauga, "Any place where there are large springs, generally there were populations of American Indians because of the water source". The Cherokee constructed their courthouse for the Chickamuaga District on a spot adjacent to Crawfish Spring.

=== White settlement ===
Shortly after the forced removal of the Cherokee from their ancestral lands in Georgia, in 1840 white settler James Gordon built a 2,500-acre (10 km^{2}) plantation and constructed a two-story brick house, now known as the Gordon-Lee Mansion, adjacent to Crawfish Spring. The house was built on the site of the old Cherokee courthouse.

=== Civil War ===
With the outbreak of the American Civil War James Gordon's son, Clark Gordon stood upon a rock beside the Gordon-Lee Mansion and organized 2nd Company D, First Georgia Volunteer Infantry, C.S.A.

On September 16, 1863, two days preceding the Battle of Chickamauga, Union Major General William S. Rosecrans commandeered the house and surrounding property for use as his headquarters during the battle. The spring became the primary water source for troops under Rosecrans' command. One of his staff officers, Col. John P. Sanderson, wrote in his diary that "the spring here is a magnificent one, affording an abundant supply for man and beast of the entire army, of cool, soft, and delicious water". A member of the 37th Indiana Infantry Regiment was also impressed by the spring. George H. Putney wrote "After going some distance, we came to Crawfish Springs. There we were permitted to fill our canteens, which we gladly did, as we knew the importance of water in a bottle. What a beautiful spring of water that was and is! Think of going from that pure life-giving fountain of clear, cold water, springing up in great abundance, to a great and dreadful battle where smoke and dust and toil and wounds and death hold high carnival. That is war!" The 39th Indiana Mounted Infantry encamped at the spring during the battle, which precipitated the establishment of the federal army's major field hospital and medical supply depot there. After the start of battle, wounded filled the Gordon house and large tents that were erected on the grounds. When the number of wounded Union soldiers overwhelmed those facilities, the wounded were laid out in rows on the ground, with lines of campfires at their feet. On September 20, 1863, cavalry under the command of Confederate Major General Joseph Wheeler swept through the area, capturing the hospital and large quantities of medical supplies, in addition to 1,000 wounded Union soldiers.

Twenty-six years after the Battle of Chickamauga, on September 20, 1889, General Rosecrans returned to Crawfish Spring, where he was greeted by Confederate Major General John B. Gordon (then governor of the state of Georgia) in a reunion of former foes "in the spirit of reconciliation and friendship". The reunion was attended by 14,000 veterans from both sides of the conflict and was known as the Blue and Gray Barbecue. The event prompted President Benjamin Harrison to designate the Chickamauga battlefield as America's first Military Park.

== Water supply and recreational area ==
Until 1888, the area and post office of Chickamauga was known as Crawfish Spring. The spring was the primary water supply for settlers and for the city itself. When the city converted to another water source, Crawfish Spring became a recreational area.

== Geology ==
Crawfish Spring is estimated to flow at a rate of approximately 14 million US gallons per day (610,000 L/ks), emanating from the base of a small dolomite hill. It is along the contact of the Chickamauga Limestone and Knox Dolomite. The Knox Dolomite forms Missionary Ridge to the west of the spring, and it is this chert ridge that acts as the catchment area for the water flowing from the spring.
