= Hjalmar Hjorth Boyesen =

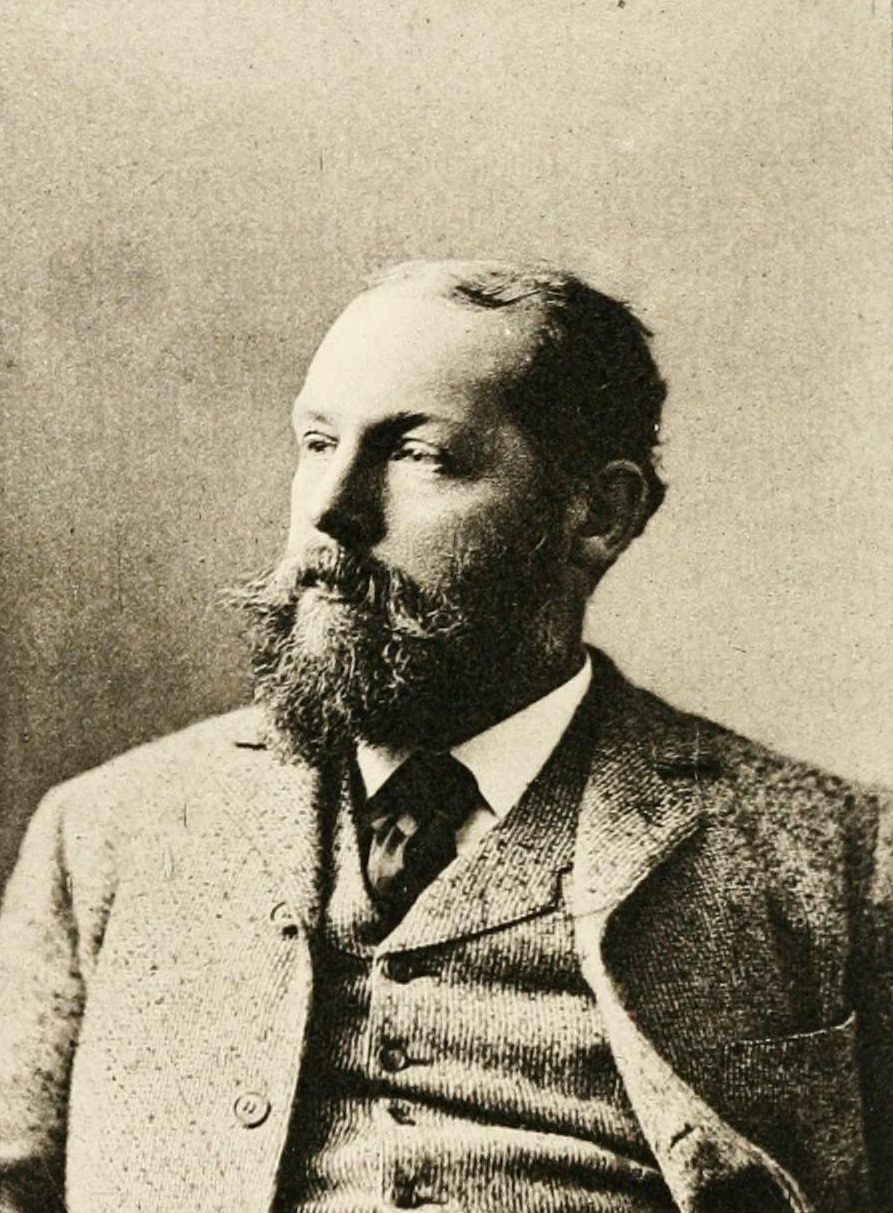
- Born: September 23, 1848; Fredriksvern, Vestfold, Norway
- Died: October 4, 1895 (aged 47); New York City, New York, U.S.
- Citizenship: Norwegian-American
- Education: University of Leipzig; University of Oslo
- Occupations: Author, professor
- Notable work: Gunnar: A Tale of Norse Life (1874)
- Spouse: Elizabeth Kean (m. 1878)
- Children: 3
