= Knud Langeland =

American politician

Knud Langeland (October 27, 1813 – February 8, 1888) was an American editor, farmer and politician.

== Biography ==
Langeland was born in Samnanger, Norway and went to school in Norway. From 1834 to 1843, he served as a sexton and a school teacher near Bergen, Norway. In 1843, Langeland emigrated to the United States and settled on a farm in Racine County, Wisconsin Territory. In 1849, Langeland's brother-in-law, O. J. Hatlestad bought the first Norwegian newspaper in the United States, Nordlyset, and Langeland served as the editor. Upon moving the location of publication to Racine, Wisconsin, he renamed the newspaper to Democraten. The name was not meant to be associated with the Democratic Party, but rather to reflect its newly reformed more democratic editorial policy.

In 1860, Langeland served in the Wisconsin State Assembly and was a Republican. In 1866, Langeland became the editor of the newspaper Skandinaven, which was published in Chicago, Illinois. He relinquished editing Skandinaven in 1871, and then briefly became co-editor of the Chicago daily newspaper Amerika, before returning to Skandinaven between 1875 and 1881. He would publish his book and partial autobiography, Nordmændene i Amerika: nogle optegnelser om de norskes udvandring til Amerika in 1888. Langeland retired because of ill health and died in Milwaukee, Wisconsin.
