= James DeNoon Reymert =

American politician (1821–1896)

James D. Reymert

Member of the Wisconsin Senate from the 10th district
- In office January 11, 1854 – January 9, 1856
- Preceded by: Marvin H. Bovee
- Succeeded by: Edward Gernon

Member of the Wisconsin State Assembly from the Milwaukee 9th district
- In office January 14, 1857 – January 13, 1858
- Preceded by: George Hahn
- Succeeded by: Michael Hanrahan

Member of the Wisconsin State Assembly from the Racine 2nd district
- In office January 10, 1849 – January 9, 1850
- Preceded by: Henry B. Roberts
- Succeeded by: Stephen O. Bennett

Personal details
- Born: James DeNoon Reymert; October 24, 1821 Farsund, Sweden–Norway
- Died: March 25, 1896 (aged 74) Los Angeles, California
- Party: Democrat; Free Soil (before 1853)

James DeNoon Reymert (October 24, 1821 – March 25, 1896) was a Norwegian American immigrant, newspaper editor, mine operator, lawyer, and politician.

== Public offices in Wisconsin ==
Reymert was elected a member of the second Wisconsin constitutional convention (1847–1848). He served in 1849 as a Free Soil member of the Wisconsin State Assembly from Racine County, and as a member of the county's board of supervisors.
