= Wilhelmine Key =

American biologist (1872–1955)

Wilhelmine Marie Key
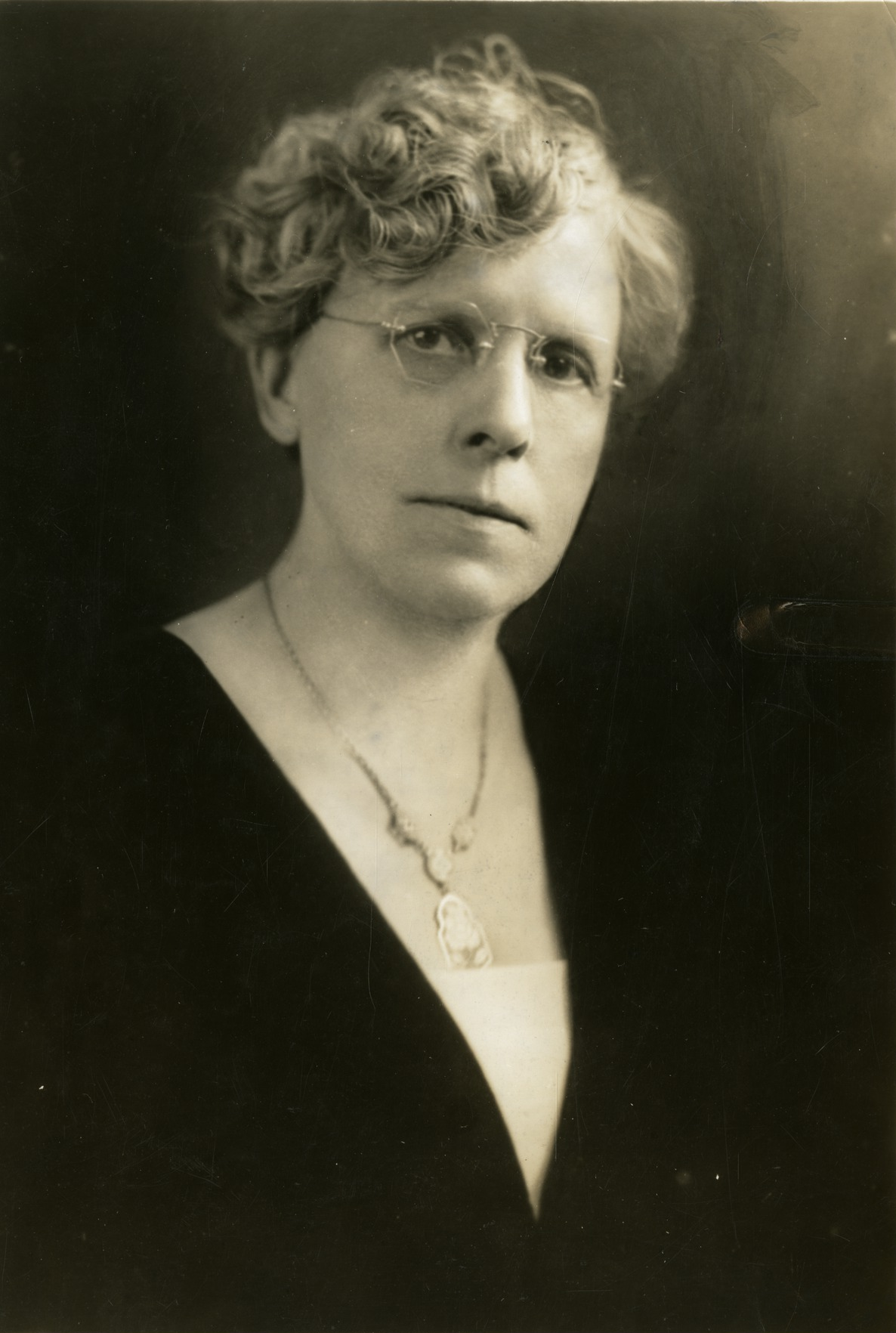
- Born: Wilhelmine Enteman; February 22, 1872; Hartford, Wisconsin, U.S.
- Died: January 31, 1955 (aged 82); Everett, Washington, U.S.
- Resting place: Village of Hartland Cemetery, Wisconsin, U.S. 43.10176°N 88.35858°W
- Other names: Minnie
- Education: University of Wisconsin–Madison (A.B., 1894); University of Chicago (PhD, 1901)
- Spouse: Francis B. Key (1876–1906)
- Scientific career
- Fields: Genetics, Eugenics
- Institutions: Green Bay East High School (1894–1898); University of Chicago (1898–1902); New Mexico Normal University (1903–1904); Belmont College (1907–1909); Lombard College (1909–1912); Eugenics Record Office (1912–1920); Race Betterment Foundation (1920–1925)
- Thesis: Coloration of Polistes (the common paper wasp) (1901)
- Doctoral advisor: Charles Otis Whitman
- Other academic advisors: Edward Ashael Birge, Charles Davenport
- Notable students: Sewall Wright

Wilhelmine "Minnie" Marie Enteman Key (February 22, 1872 – January 31, 1955) was an American geneticist. She was the first woman to gain a PhD in zoology from the University of Chicago, where she studied coloration in paper wasps. She contributed to the study of eugenics and was an influential teacher to Sewall Wright.

== Early life and education ==
Key was born in Hartford, Wisconsin, in 1872. She was the fourth child of Katherine E. Noller and Charles John Enteman. In her childhood she studied wasps. At the age of 16 she enrolled at the University of Wisconsin–Madison. While there, she assisted Edward Asahel Birge in his study of Lake Mendota. In her sophomore year she became the class second vice-president.

Later in her college career, she joined the honor society Phi Beta Kappa. She obtained her AB from the University of Wisconsin. She attended the University of Chicago supported by a fellowship. As an adult, she retained her childhood interest in studying wasps, and even kept some as pets. While under the supervision of Charles Davenport and Charles Otis Whitman, she studied variation in paper wasp coloration. She earned the Latin honor magna cum laude for her dissertation work. She was the first woman to earn a PhD in zoology from the University of Chicago.

== Academic career and research ==
After she obtained her AB, Key worked as an assistant in German and biology at Green Bay High School from 1894 to 1898. She then attended the University of Chicago and earned her PhD in zoology in 1901. She briefly remained at the University of Chicago as an assistant until 1902. Afterwards, she became the head of the German and Nature Study department at the New Mexico Normal University from 1903 to 1904. After living in California for three years, she became a presiding teacher at Belmont College from 1907 to 1909. She then became a professor of German and biology at Lombard college from 1909 to 1912 where she mentored Sewall Wright. They continued a correspondence throughout their lives.

From 1912 to 1914, Key worked as a eugenics field worker at the Eugenics Record Office. Afterwards, she worked briefly as an investigator at the Public Charities Association in Pennsylvania. From 1914 to 1917, she was an education director at the Pennsylvania State Training School in Polk. As part of her position, she gave a talk on feeble-mindedness. She also completed her seminal work "Feeble-minded Citizens in Pennsylvania," which was used to recommend appropriation from the Pennsylvania state legislature to isolate feeble-minded women from the population to prevent the spread of feeble-mindedness.

Later, Key worked as an archivist for three years. From 1920 to 1925, she was the head of biology and eugenics research in the Race Betterment Foundation. While there, she gave lectures including topics "Hereditary and Human Fitness," "The Comparative effect on the Individual Heredity and Environment", "Heredity and Personality", "Are we better than our forefathers?", "Our Friends, the Trees", and "Heredity and Eugenics". She spoke at the Battle Creek Garden Club on the importance of trees.

Outside of work, Key gave addresses to the Auxiliary Luncheon and the local Woman's League on the topic of "Are the Fathers and Mothers of Today Equal to the Fathers and Mothers of Yesterday?" Finally, she worked as a private researcher from 1925 until her death in 1955. Some of her time was spent on the advisory board of a new arts center in Florida built by the Woman's History Foundation.

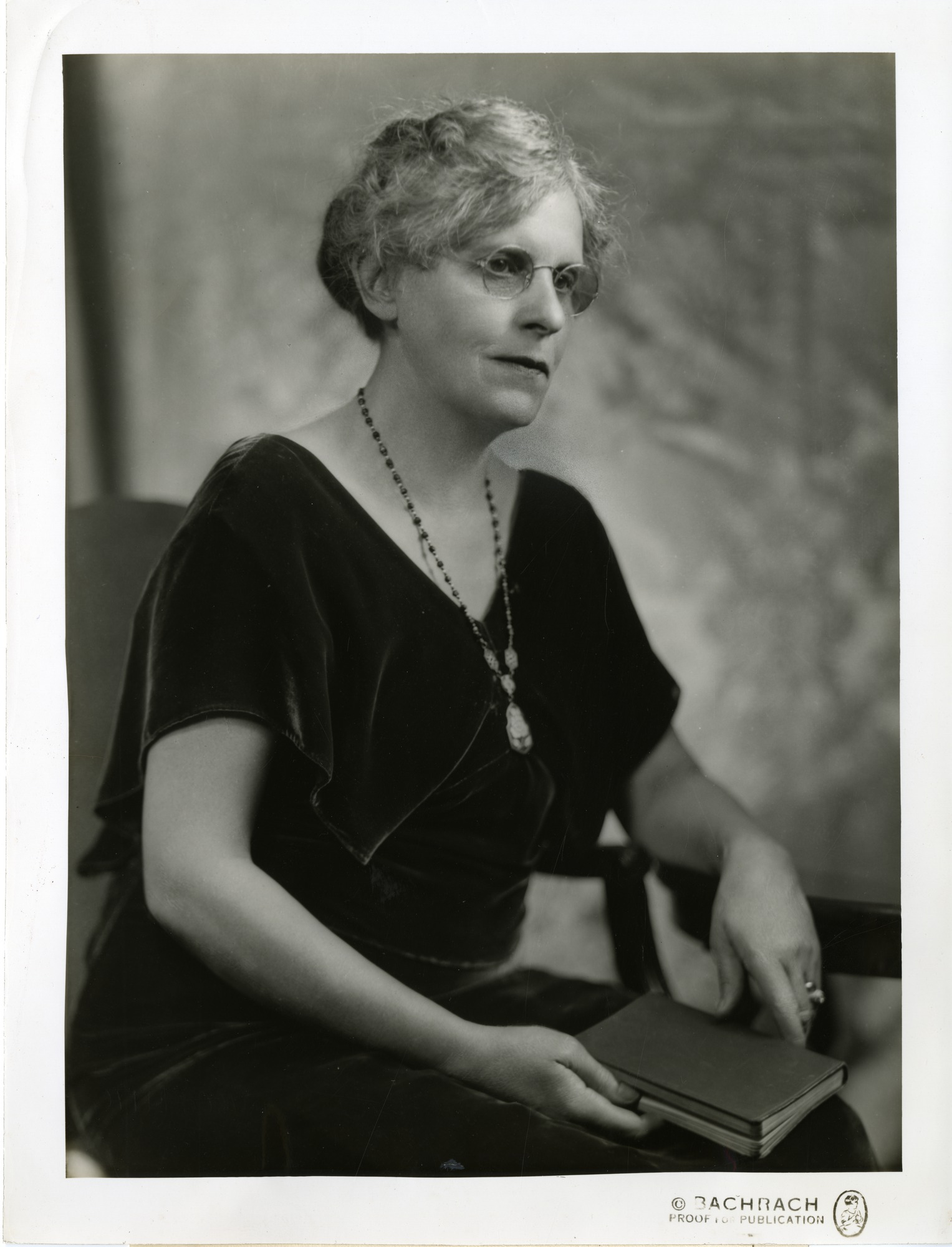
Key in 1939

== Works ==
- Some Observations on the Behavior of the Social Wasps (1902)
- Coloration in Polistes (1904)
- Feeble-minded Citizens in Pennsylvania (1915)
- Heredity and social fitness (1920)
- Race and Family in the History of American Institutions (1934)
- Fake heredity in fiction
- Differential Fertility in Old Colonial Families (1935)

== Personal life ==
Key married cartoonist Francis Brute Key. They married in Los Angeles at the Church of Angels on June 23, 1906. Shortly after their marriage, Key's husband died of tuberculosis on December 2, 1906.

== Later life and legacy ==
Key died of a cerebral hemorrhage on January 31, 1955, while on a visit to see family in Everett, Washington. She is buried in Village of Hartland Cemetery in Hartland, Wisconsin. She bequeathed the majority of her estate to fund a lecture series for human genetics at the American Genetic Association which bears her name. The remaining portion went to the University of Wisconsin–Madison to fund scholarships for research.

== Awards and achievements ==
- Fellow of the American Association for the Advancement of Science
- Represented the United States at the International Population Congress of Scientist
- Attended National Conference of Social Work
- Gave an address at the International Union for Scientific Investigation of Population Problems
