= Juday =

Juday can be a nickname, a given name, or a surname. Notable people with the name include:

== Nickname ==
- Judy Ann Santos (born 1978), Filipino actress and film producer

== Given name ==
- Juday al-Kirmani (fl. 736–747), Umayyad Caliphate commander

== Surname ==
- Chancey Juday (1871–1944), American limnologist
- Richard Juday, co-inventor of the White–Juday warp-field interferometer
- Robert Juday (1900–1988), American high jumper
- Steve Juday (born c. 1945), American football quarterback
