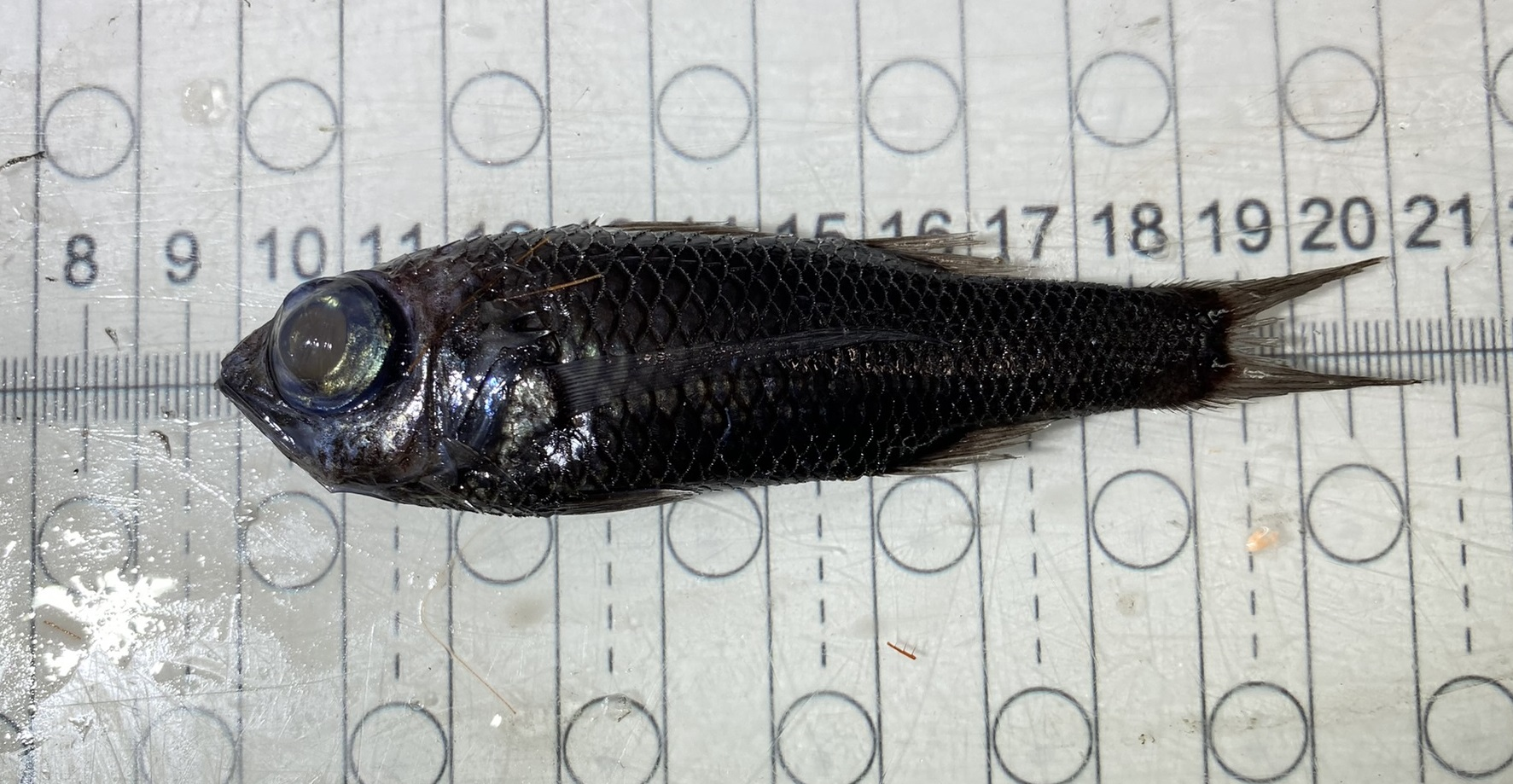

Conservation status
- Least Concern (IUCN 3.1)

Scientific classification
- Kingdom: Animalia
- Phylum: Chordata
- Class: Actinopterygii
- Order: Acropomatiformes
- Family: Howellidae
- Genus: Howella
- Species: H. atlantica

Binomial name
- Howella atlantica Post & Quéro, 1991

= Howella atlantica =

Species of fish

Howella atlantica, commonly known as the Atlantic pelagic basslet and the Atlantic pricklefish, is a species of teleost fish in the oceanic basslet family Howellidae.

== Distribution ==
As suggested by its specific name, Howella atlantica is found in the Atlantic Ocean, found in across all latitudes of the North Atlantic but restricted to tropical waters in the South Atlantic. It is present in both the Western and Eastern Atlantic.

H. atlantica is an inhabitant of deep, open waters between about 100 and 1,800 m (330 and 5,910 ft), typically residing in the mesopelagic between 100 and 1,100 m (330 and 3,610 ft).

== Physical description ==
Howella atlantica is a small, fish with large eyes and robust spines in its first dorsal fin. It is generally dark in colour, with black scales, possibly with a greenish sheen, that have a spinous anterior margin. The head is unscaled, and is covered in skin that is dark with a metallic blue hint under illumination. At the rear margin of the opercle, there is a cluster of two spines. Its lateral line is divided into three distinct segments.

The first dorsal fin is composed of 7-8 rigid spines, with the first spine much shorter than the second; the second dorsal fin has 10-11 soft rays. The anal fin also possesses three spines, with 7-8 soft rays. H. atlantica reaches a standard length of about 7.5 cm (3.0 in), however may be found larger than this in high latitudes; by contrast, smaller individuals are found in tropical seas.

=== Eyes ===
The eyes of Howella are large, as is common among mesopelagic fishes. There is a thick corneal spectacle visible in fresh specimens as a gelatinous layer that somewhat obscures the pupil. An aphakic gap is present between the iris and the lens on the anterior margin of the pupil. In fresh specimens, the retina has a distinct gold colour. Below the retina there is a reflective tapetum lucidum composed of white lipid spheres, similar to the tapeta found in weakfishes and cusk-eels. The retina contains orderly rows of rod cells.

== Ecology ==
Little is known about the trophic ecology of Howella atlantica. Two species of melanostomiine dragonfish, Eustomias acinosus and E. filifer, are specialist predators of H. atlantica.
