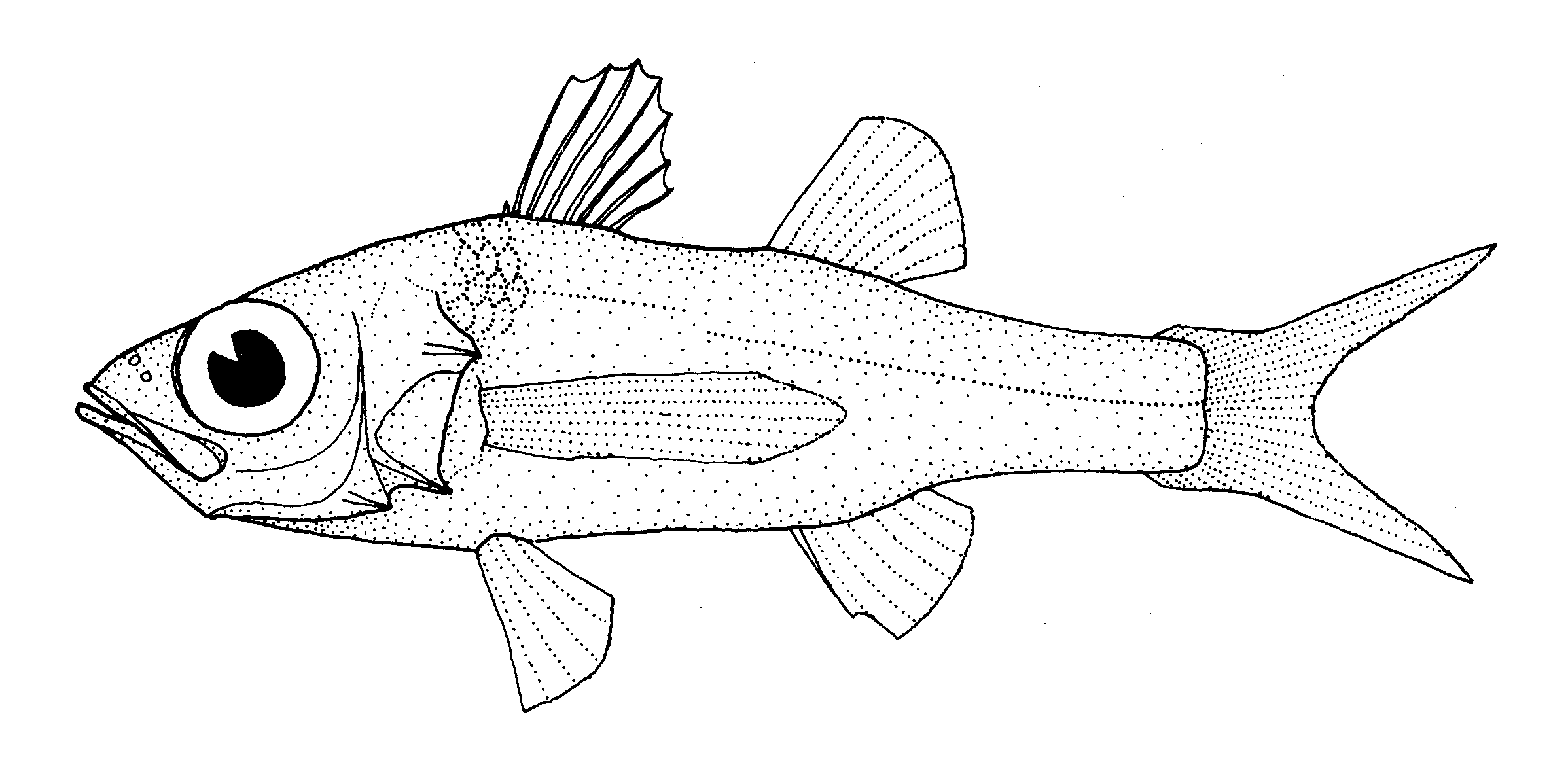
- pelagic basslet (H. brodiei)

Scientific classification
- Domain: Eukaryota
- Kingdom: Animalia
- Phylum: Chordata
- Class: Actinopterygii
- Order: Acropomatiformes
- Family: Howellidae
- Genus: Howella; J. D. Ogilby, 1899

Type species
- Howella brodiei J. D. Ogilby, 1899

Synonyms
- Galeagra Heller & Snodgrass, 1903; Rhectogramma Norman, 1930

= Howella =

Genus of ray-finned fishes

Howella is a genus of ray-finned fish in the family Howellidae, the oceanic basslets. They are found in all oceans.

Species include:

- Howella atlantica Post & Quéro, 1991 – Atlantic pelagic basslet
- Howella brodiei J. D. Ogilby, 1899 – pelagic basslet
- Howella pammelas (Heller & Snodgrass, 1903)
- Howella parini Fedoryako, 1976
- Howella sherborni (Norman, 1930) – Sherborn's pelagic basslet
- Howella zina Fedoryako, 1976

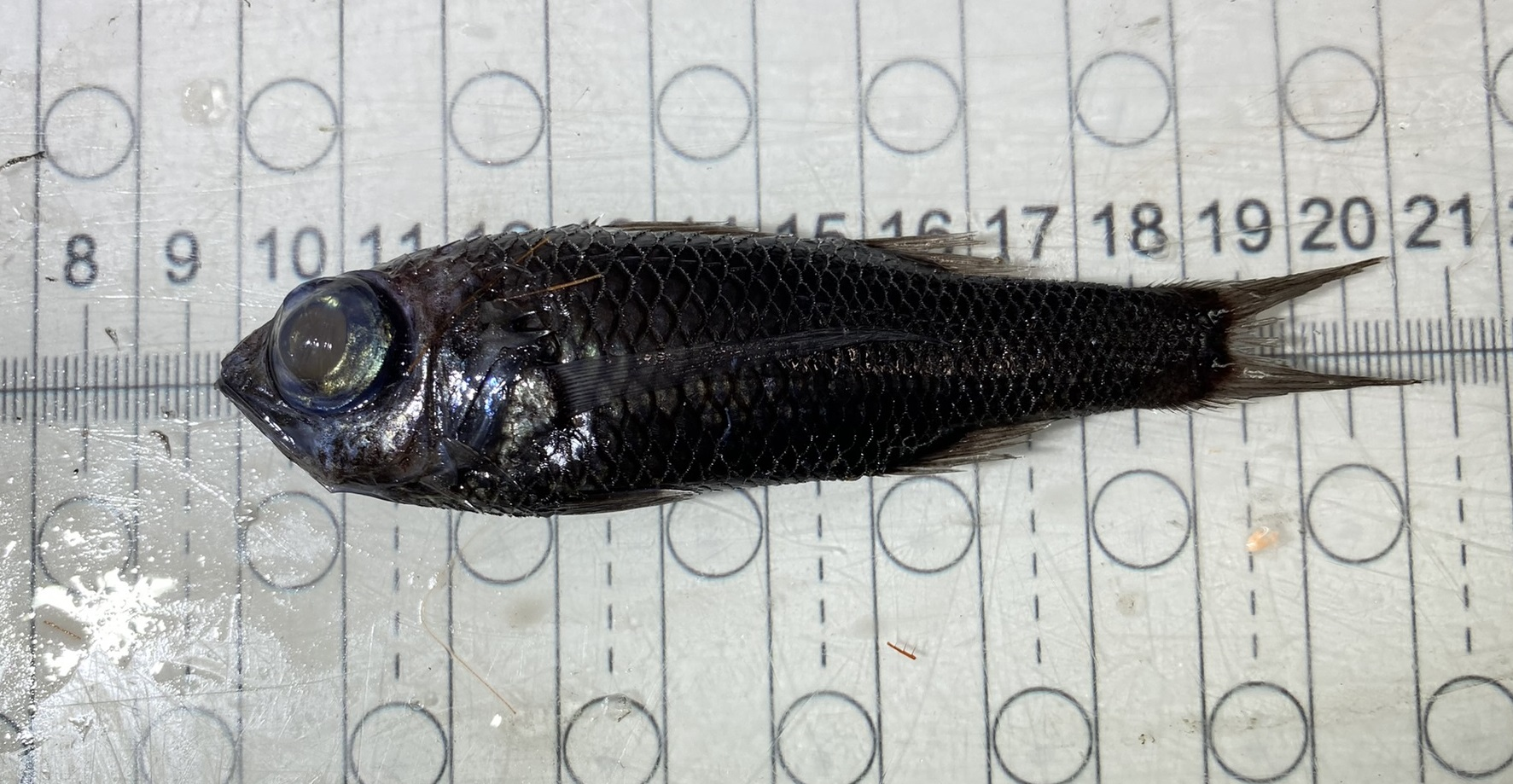
Fresh specimen of H. atlantica photographed in the North Atlantic
