= University of Wisconsin–Madison Lakeshore Nature Preserve =

Protected area in Wisconsin, United States

- Interactive map of University of Wisconsin–Madison Lakeshore Nature Preserve
- Location: Wisconsin, United States
- Nearest city: Madison
- Coordinates: 43°4′32″N 89°25′30″W
- Area: 300 acres (1.2 km^{2})
- Governing body: Lakeshore Nature Preserve Committee
- Website: http://lakeshorepreserve.wisc.edu/index.htm

The University of Wisconsin–Madison Lakeshore Nature Preserve is a 300-acre (1.2 km^{2}) nature reserve along 4 miles (6.4 km) of the southern shore of Lake Mendota. The preserve's primary goals are to protect native plant and animal communities, as well as to uphold the campus's signature natural landscapes, all while providing an educational facility for the university.

== Areas of the preserve ==
Areas are listed in order of appearance along the Lakeshore Path, starting in the east.

=== Muir Woods ===
Muir Woods is a heavily forested area covering 7 acres (0.028 km^{2}) of land on the northern slope of Bascom Hill. Despite its location in the heart of the campus, the woods have remained relatively secluded from human activity. The forest is named after John Muir, a former UW–Madison student and naturalist.

=== Willow Creek Woods ===
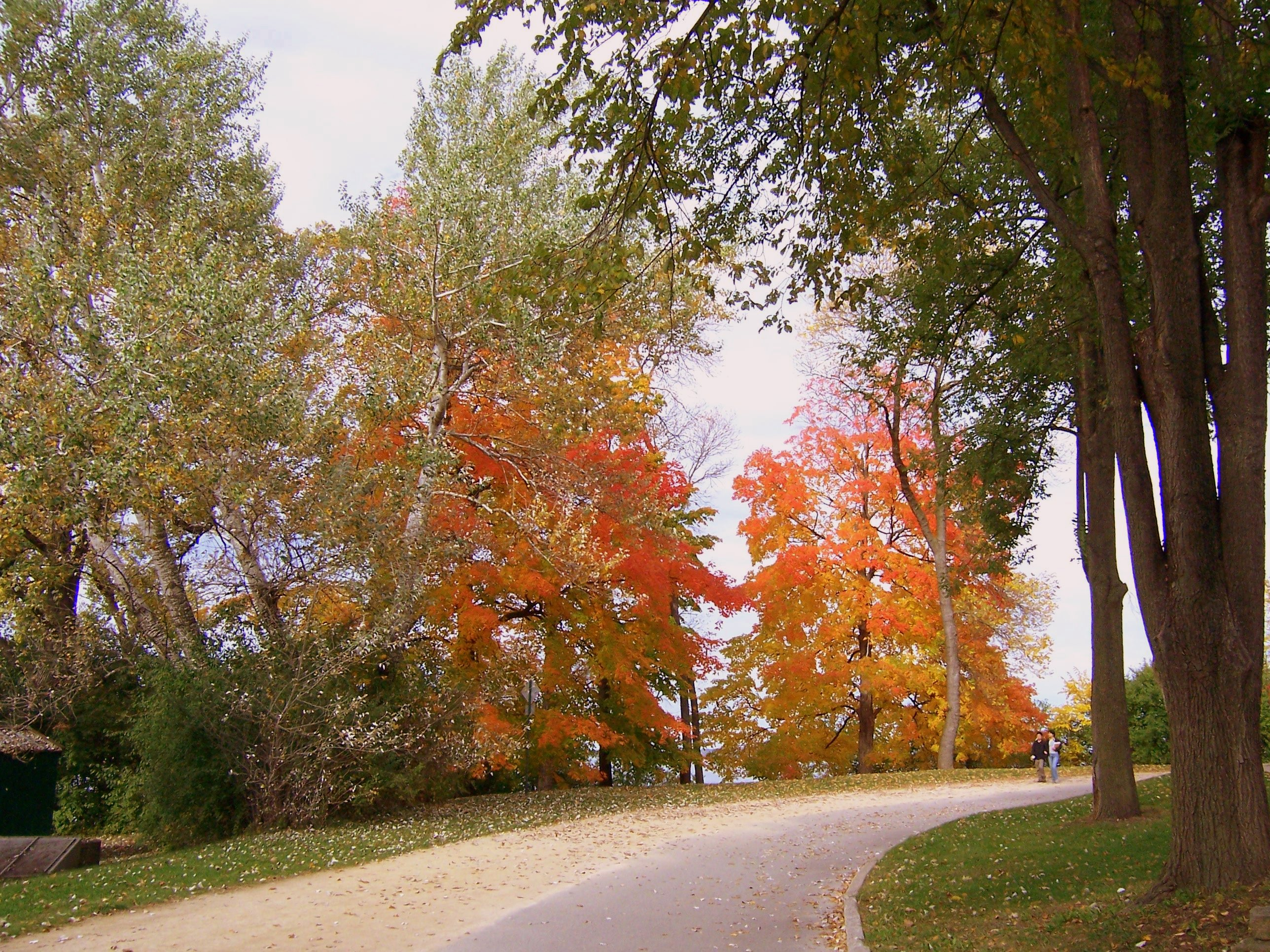
Lakeshore Path as it leads into Willow Creek Woods.

Willow Creek Woods consist of the forested areas surrounding Willow Creek, located in the central part of the campus. The area is populated with several types of oak trees including bur oak, white oak, and black oak, as well as various weeds, and other woody plant life.

==== Willow Beach ====
Willow Beach is located just to the east of the mouth of Willow Creek. It is a popular location for swimming and sightseeing. The area is also used to store rowboats and canoes.

=== Triangle Marsh ===
Triangle Marsh, located just to the east of Walnut Street, is a small pond connected to the Lake Mendota water system. The area is being developed for use as a northern pike nursery.

=== University Bay Marsh ===
The University Bay Marsh is located along the western edge of University Bay where natural lake currents have been accumulating silt, thus encouraging the growth of marsh vegetation.

=== Class of 1918 Marsh ===
The Class of 1918 Marsh is a small wetland created by the recession of glaciers from the Wisconsin area about 15,000 years ago. The wetland system had been connected to Lake Mendota before lake currents built up a sandbar dividing the lake from the system. At one time, the wetland was much larger, but development in the area reduced it to its current size. The marsh was drained in 1910 after the university acquired the land and began farming experiments there. It was restored in 1969 as part of an environmental studies class project, with funds donated by the class of 1918 during their 50-year reunion.

=== Picnic Point ===
Picnic Point is a nearly 1 mile (1.6 km) long peninsula that reaches into Lake Mendota just north of University Bay. Recent archaeological surveys indicate that the point may have been inhabited for at least 12,000 years. During European settlement in the 19th century the point was densely covered with farm land. The university acquired the property in 1941.

==== The Narrows ====
About halfway to the end of the peninsula, Picnic Point narrows into an isthmus where the lake can be seen on either side. Formerly known as "The Portage" because the narrow strip of land was a prime location for crossing the peninsula, its extensive view has made it a favorite resting area along Lakeshore Path.

==== Picnic Point Marsh ====
Picnic Point Marsh is a relatively secluded inland pond densely covered with silver maple, elm, and box elder trees and reed canary grass. Other wildlife include sora rails and wood ducks. Despite its proximity to Lake Mendota, the marsh has its own source of water.

==== Old Orchard and Fields ====
The Old Orchard and Fields are the remnants from agricultural use in the late 19th century. The future use of this area has yet to be determined.

=== Bill's Woods ===
Bill's Woods, like many other areas of the preserve, is a restoration of the original forest that was cropped to make room for farming and agricultural research. The canopy of the restored forest includes white oak, red oak, bur oak, and hickory trees.

=== Big Woods ===
The Big Woods is one of the most recent additions to the preserve. It has remained relativity undisturbed and is therefore one of the most biologically diverse areas of the preserve. The canopy includes species such as white and red oak, sugar maple, basswood, black cherry, and hackberry. Understory species include nannyberry, pagoda dogwood, and red elder. Because of the area's location on a slope and its recent inclusion as part of the preserve, trails have not yet been constructed and entry by the public without a guide is discouraged.

=== Caretaker's Woods ===
Caretaker's Woods, named for the caretaker's house that was once in the area, are located on 8 acres (0.032 km^{2}) of land along the lake, just to the north and west of Picnic Point. The land in this area slopes quite dramatically toward the lake, which means that it receives less direct sunlight in comparison to other parts of the preserve. Vegetation in this area prefers a cool, moist environment. Trees in the woods are a mix of young maples, basswoods, and slippery elms, and older red oaks.

=== Second Point Woods ===
Located just to the east of Frautschi Point (formerly known as Second Point), Second Point Woods were originally a small grouping of red oak trees surrounded by several agricultural fields. Those fields have since grown over during the second half of the twentieth century, which has left a distinctive division between the older core of the woods and the newer vegetation at its perimeter.

=== Frautschi Point ===
Frautschi Point, the northernmost part of the preserve, is a heavily wooded area that extends from Lake Mendota in the north to agricultural fields in the south. The site seems to have had a large concentration of ancient settlements, as revealed by a 2004 archaeological survey of the UW–Madison campus. Formerly known as Second Point, it was renamed after the Frautschi family bought the land and donated it to the university.

Vegetation in the area is divided into several sections. Near the Lake Mendota Drive entrance there is a heavy population of red pine, spruce, white pine, red cedar and catalpa trees. Species in the southern portion of the point include silver maple, hackberry, green ash, box elder, and cottonwood trees. Several hardwood trees round out holes in the forest, including sugar maple, hackberry, basswood, and black cherry, along with red elderberry shrubs. The area has issues with invasive non-native vegetation, such as buckthorn, honeysuckle, and Norway maples.

The point has a dense bird population, especially during migration season. Other wildlife include gray squirrels, eastern chipmunks, and eastern cottontails, along with some nocturnal species.

=== Tent Colony Woods ===
The Tent Colony Woods were the home of "Camp Gallistella," a temporary summer home for up to as many as 300 graduate students and their families that existed between 1912 and 1962. This housing practice ended when the Eagle Heights Apartments were constructed.

==== Raymer's Cove ====
Raymer's Cove is a small cove that is being formed where Raymer's Ravine meets Lake Mendota. It is named after George Raymer who donated the land to the Madison Park and Pleasure Drive Association.

==== Raymer's Ravine ====
Raymer's Ravine is a water collection channel that serves as a storm drain for the surrounding areas. The mouth of the ravine connects to Lake Mendota via Raymer's Cove. Because parts of the ravine are lined with sandstone, which is very susceptible to erosion, much of the preservation in this area is aimed at controlling erosion.

=== Wally Bauman Woods ===
Wally Bauman Woods is 3.4 acres (0.014 km^{2}) of forested land at the westernmost point of the reserve. It is named after Walter R. Bauman, who was instrumental in the preservation of the land from development.

The university originally obtained rights to the land in 1911, but in 1941 exchanged them for the rights to Picnic Point, before the land could be protected. Parts of the land were eventually recovered by the university, with other portions slated for residential development. Public outcry over these development plans spurred the creation of the Natural Heritage Land Trust (formerly the Dane County Natural Heritage Foundation), a joint public/private organization that served as a vehicle for land acquisition. After many years of collecting donations, the Land Trust was able to acquire the woods in 1984.

Because the area has never been developed, it is one of the most ecologically diverse areas of the preserve. Problems with invasive species have caused much of the preservation effort to be aimed at controlling them.

=== Eagle Heights Woods ===
The Eagle Heights Woods is 28 acres (0.11 km^{2}) of forested area located atop a bluff just to the southeast of the Wally Bauman Woods. It is best known as the location of three Native American burial mounds located at the woods' highest point.

The university originally came to the land in 1911, but the land was turned over to Edward Young in exchange for Picnic Point, along with the Wally Bauman Woods. Three years after Young's death in 1948, the northern portion of the woods was sold to Thomas Brittingham Jr. who then donated the land back to the university. The remainder of the woods was sold to residential developers.

The woods' vegetation is well known for its oak tree population and diverse understory. Understory species include shooting stars, trillium, and wild geranium.

== The Lakeshore Path ==
The Lakeshore Path, the main connecting route among all areas of the preserve, consists of two separate trails: the Howard Temin Path in the east and the Lake Mendota Path in the west. The path traces its history back 12,000 years to when the first people in the area created footpaths in order to access the water and move from settlement to settlement.

=== Pictures from the path ===
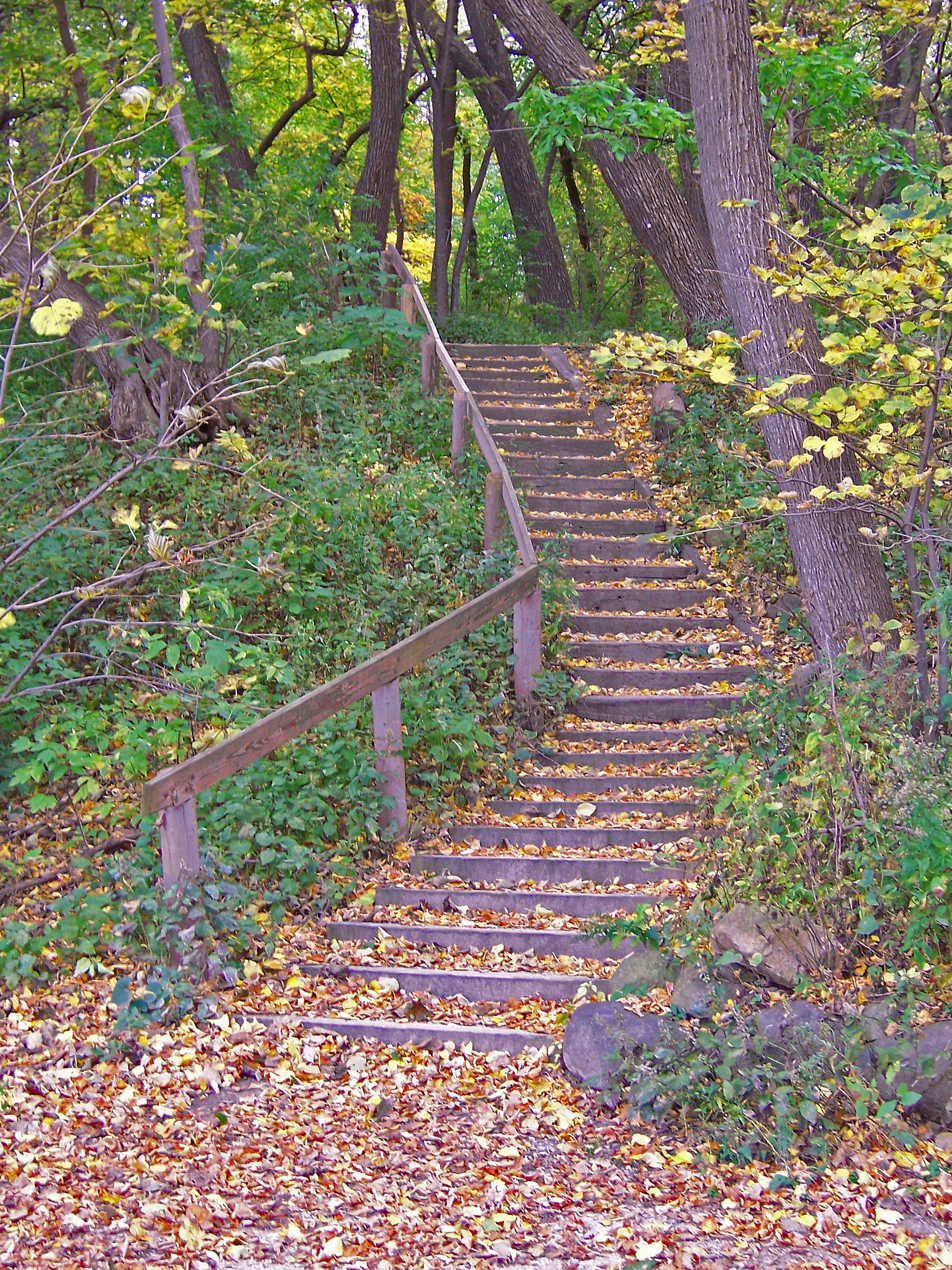
Stairs leading from the Lakeshore Path to Muir Woods

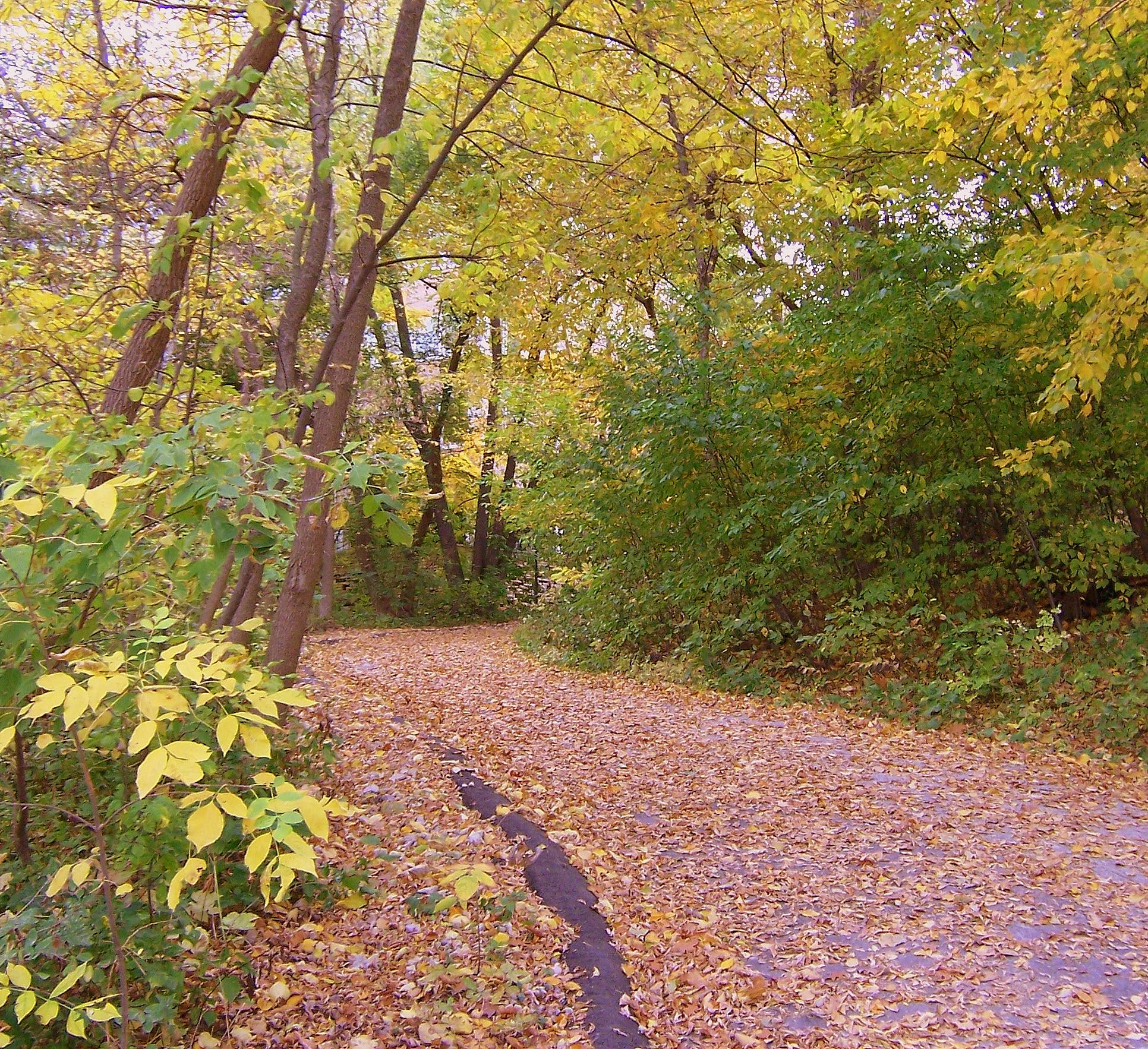
The Lakeshore Path as it enters the northernmost portion of Muir Woods

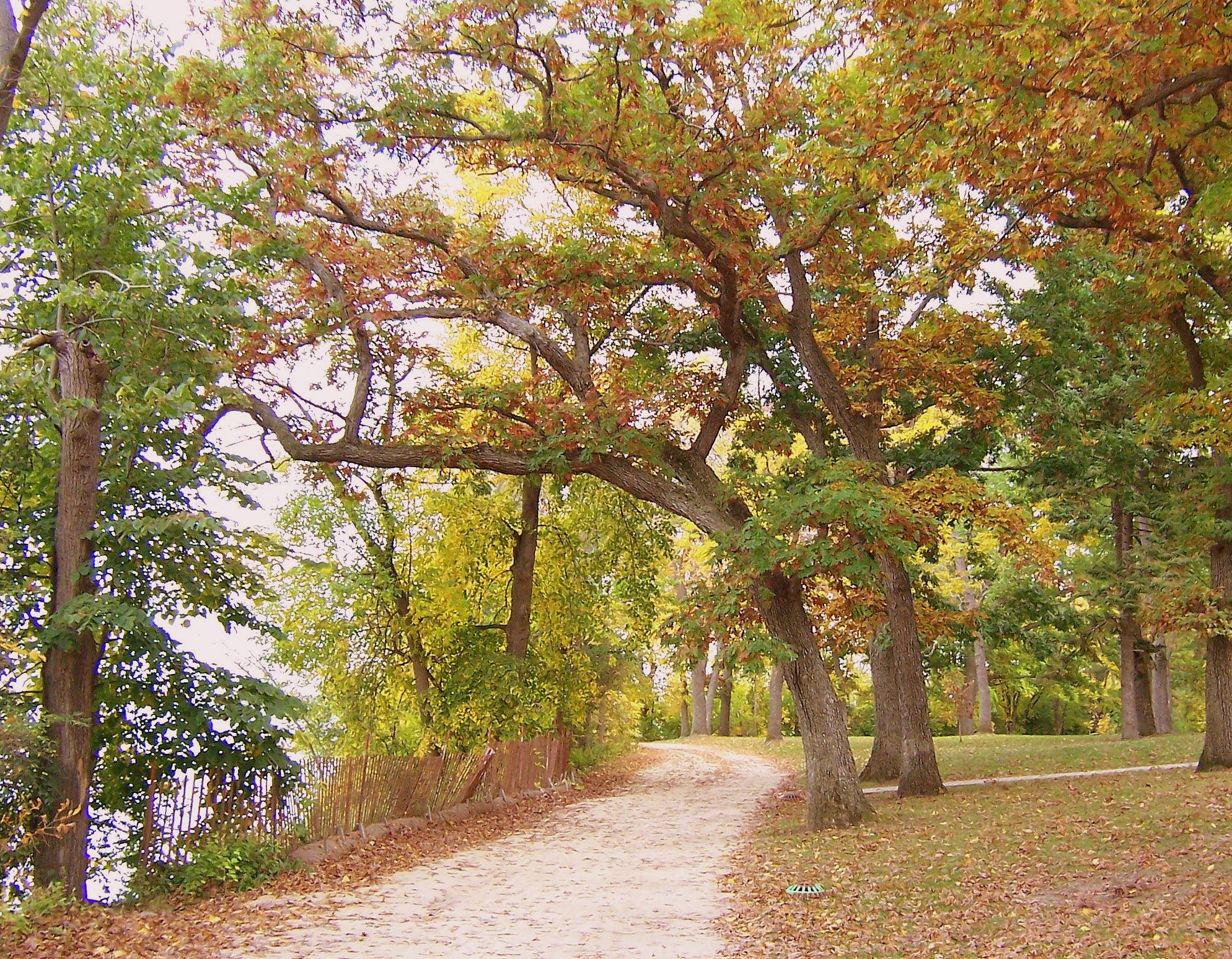
The Lakeshore Path behind the UW–Madison lakeshore residence halls
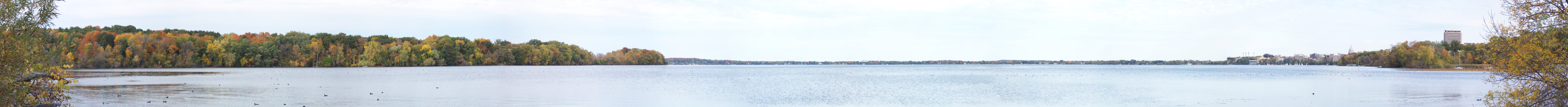
University Bay and Picnic Point as seen from the Lakeshore Path
