= Edward Asahel Birge =

American limnologist and educator (1851–1950)

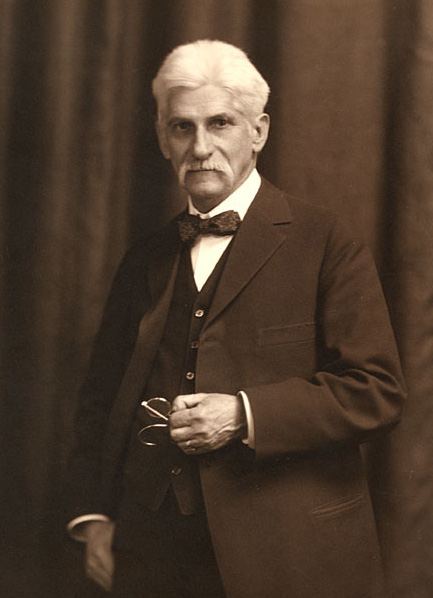
- E. A. Birge in 1918

President of University of Wisconsin–Madison
- In office 1918–1925
- Preceded by: Charles R. Van Hise
- Succeeded by: Glenn Frank
- In office 1901–1903
- Preceded by: Charles Kendall Adams
- Succeeded by: Charles R. Van Hise

Personal details
- Born: September 7, 1851 Troy, New York
- Died: June 9, 1950 (aged 98) Madison, Wisconsin
- Education: Harvard University; Williams College
- Scientific career
- Fields: Zoology
- Thesis: On crustacea cladocera collected in Fresh Pond and Glacialis, Cambridge, Mass., 1876 and at Madison, Wis., 1877 (1878)
- Doctoral advisor: Nathaniel Southgate Shaler

Edward Asahel Birge (September 7, 1851 – June 9, 1950) was an American professor and administrator at the University of Wisconsin–Madison. He was one of the pioneers of the study of limnology, and served as acting president of the university from 1900 to 1903 and as president from 1918 to 1925.

Birge was born in Troy, New York. He received a bachelor's degree from Williams College in 1873. He moved on to Harvard University, where he studied under Louis Agassiz and was awarded a Ph.D. in zoology in 1878. While still completing his Ph.D., Birge was appointed an instructor at the University of Wisconsin–Madison in natural history in 1875. He was later appointed as dean in 1891.

Birge became known as a scientist and administrator. He served as dean, director of the Wisconsin Geological and Natural History Survey, and under President Charles Kendall Adams, unofficial deputy to the president.

In 1900, an ailing Adams left the university. Birge was named acting president in Adams' absence. He hoped to be named permanently to the post, but was passed over in favor of Charles R. Van Hise in 1903 after a boardroom battle between university regents William F. Vilas, who favored Birge, and Governor Robert M. La Follette, who favored Van Hise. Birge remained dean of the College of Arts and Sciences.

Van Hise died unexpectedly in 1918, and Birge was once again asked to serve as president of the university. This time he was formally named to the post, and served as president until 1925. He was regarded as an efficient administrator but was criticized then and later for refusing to make substantial changes to the university to adapt to the increase in students in the wake of World War I.

From 1921 through 1922, Birge engaged in a running debate with William Jennings Bryan, who considered evolution a heresy and labeled Birge an atheist in several speeches. Birge, a lifelong Congregationalist who had taught Bible classes for most of his professional life, wrote a pamphlet defending evolution as supported by the Bible.

Birge was elected to the American Philosophical Society in 1923.

Birge and his close collaborator Chancey Juday were pioneers of North American limnology (the study of inland waters, such as rivers and lakes). Together they founded an influential school of limnology on Lake Mendota, as a component of the University of Wisconsin. He was assisted by undergraduate student Wilhelmine Key. Birge retired from the administration in 1925 but continued his limnological research until the early 1940s, primarily in partnership with Juday. In 1950 he shared the Einar Naumann Medal of the International Association of Limnology with Juday.

He died in 1950.

Birge Hall on the University of Wisconsin–Madison campus is named for him.

Academic offices
Preceded by Charles K. Adams	President of the University of Wisconsin; 1901–1903	Succeeded by Charles R. Van Hise
Preceded by Charles R. Van Hise	President of the University of Wisconsin; 1918–1925	Succeeded by Glenn Frank
