= Charles R. Van Hise =

American geologist, academic and progressive (1857–1918)

Charles Richard Van Hise
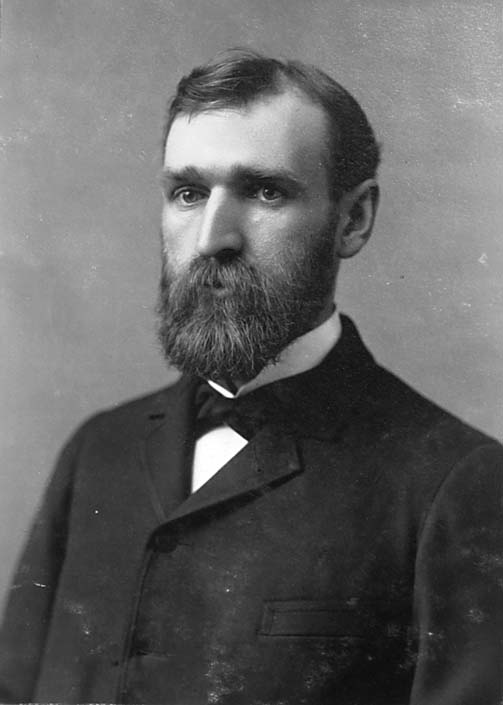
- Born: May 29, 1857; Fulton, Wisconsin
- Died: November 19, 1918 (aged 61); Milwaukee, Wisconsin
- Known for: Wisconsin Idea
- Scientific career
- Fields: Geology
- Workplaces: University of Wisconsin

Charles Richard Van Hise (May 29, 1857 – November 19, 1918) was an American geologist, academic and progressive. He served as president of the University of Wisconsin (UW) in Madison, Wisconsin, from 1903 to 1918.

== Early life and education ==
Charles Van Hise was born in 1857 in Fulton, Wisconsin, the son of William and Mary, who were farmers. At age 13 he moved with his family to a farm near Evansville, Wisconsin, where he completed his secondary education at the Evansville Seminary. In 1874, he enrolled at the University of Wisconsin in Madison, where he received his bachelor's degree in mechanical engineering in 1879. He received another B.S. in 1880 and a M.S. in 1882. In 1892 he became the first to earn a Ph.D. degree from the school, receiving a doctorate in geology. He married Alice Bushnell Ring in 1881. They had three children.

== Career ==
=== Early ===
Van Hise joined the faculty of the university immediately after graduating, as an instructor in chemistry and metallurgy (1879–1883). He then proceeded through the academic ranks as an assistant professor of metallurgy (1886–1888), professor of mineralogy and petrography (1888–1892), professor of Archaean and applied geology (1890–1892), and professor of geology (after 1892). Within this time period, he also taught at the University of Chicago as a nonresident professor of structural geology and metamorphic geology.

Upon joining the college faculty in 1879, Van Hise began collaborating with his former geology professor, Roland Irving, on a study of the Pre-Cambrian rock of northern Wisconsin. In 1882, he and Irving began a geological study of the Lake Superior region under the auspices of the United States Geological Survey, which Van Hise continued on his own after Irving's death in 1888. Four years later, he completed and presented reports to the USGS in seven volumes which served as Van Hise's doctoral dissertation.

=== Later ===
Van Hise retired from teaching and research and was elected by the Board of Regents to become the president of the University of Wisconsin on April 21, 1903. He succeeded Charles K. Adams, who had died in 1901, and Edward A. Birge, who had served as acting president for the prior two years. Van Hise was helped in his election by the support of Governor Robert La Follette. In 1904, as president of the university, he declared that "I shall never be content until the beneficent influence of the university reaches every family of the state," later articulated as the "Wisconsin Idea". He was instrumental in the formation of the University of Wisconsin-Extension division. During his tenure, UW's medical college was established, the number of faculty doubled and the university's revenue increased fourfold.

Van Hise supported eugenics laws, and promoted eugenics thought by founding the University of Wisconsin School of Criminology, stating: "We know enough about eugenics so that if that knowledge were applied, the defective classes would disappear within a generation."

Writing in After Seven Years, his 1939 account of his role as an advisor to President Franklin Delano Roosevelt, Raymond Moley credited Van Hise with the underlying philosophy of the New Deal's National Industrial Recovery Act, stating: "The source of that philosophy, as I've suggested earlier, was Van Hise's Concentration and Control, and it was endlessly discussed, from every angle, during the 'brain trust' days. In several of his campaign speeches F.D.R. had touched upon the idea of substituting, for the futile attempt to control the abuses of anarchic private economic power, by smashing it to bits, a policy of cooperative business-government planning to combat the instability of economic operations and the insecurity of livelihood. The beliefs that economic bigness was here to stay; that the problem of government was to enable the whole people to enjoy the benefits of mass production and distribution (economy and security); and that it was the duty of government to devise, with business, the means of social and individual adjustment to the facts of the industrial age—these were the heart and soul of the New Deal…. And if ever a man seemed to embrace this philosophy wholeheartedly, that man was Franklin Roosevelt." [p. 184]

Van Hise worked as a consulting geologist for the United States Geological Survey from 1909 to 1918 and published several works for them. He was the principal investigator for a team that investigated the possibility of controlling landslides adjacent to the Panama Canal. He served as the president of the Geological Society of America in 1907, the National Association of State Universities, the National Academy of Sciences, the American Association for the Advancement of Science in 1916, and the International Geological Congress in Stockholm, Sweden. He died from complications of minor surgery to treat a nasal infection in Milwaukee, Wisconsin, on November 19, 1918.

== Awards and honors ==
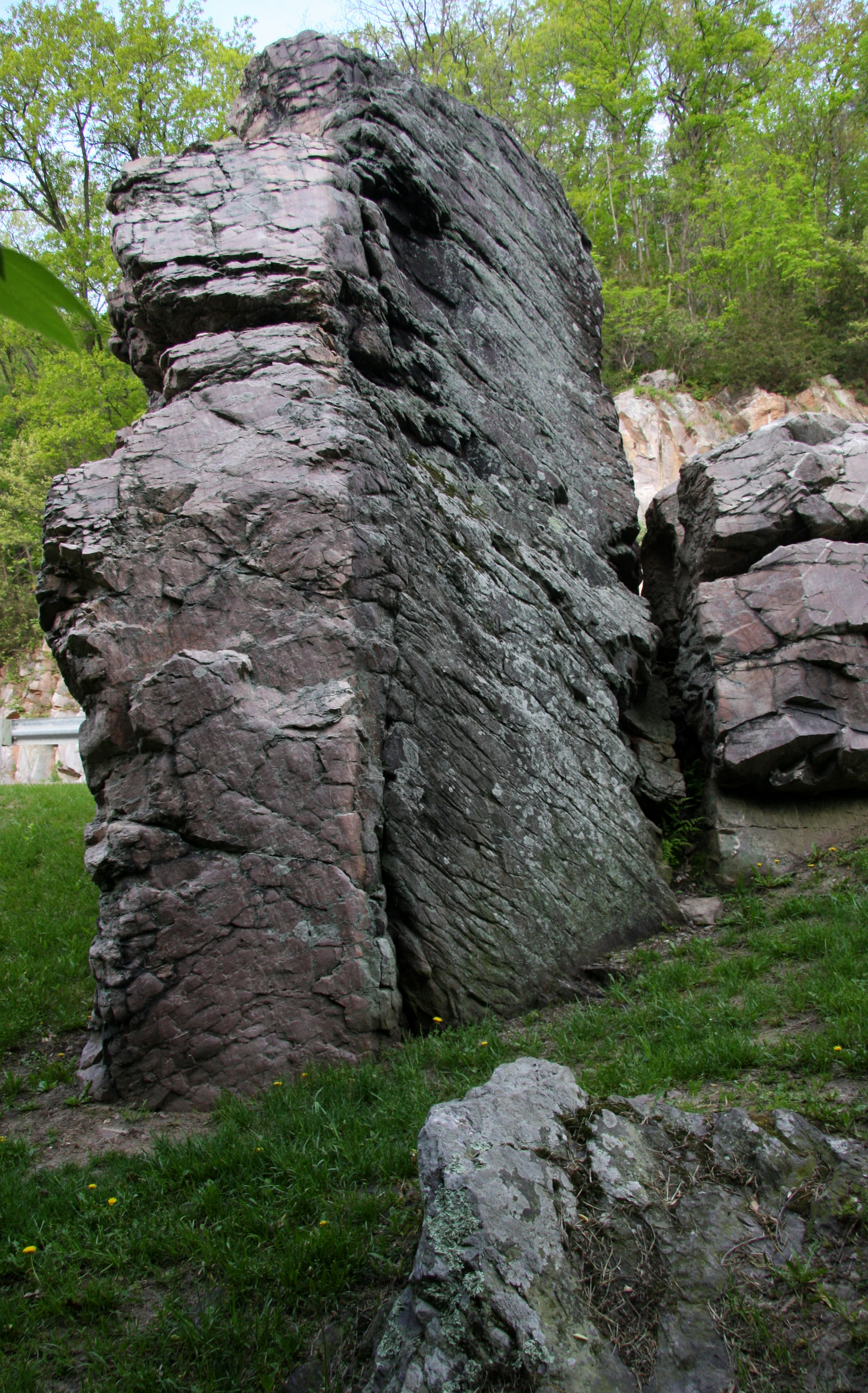
Van Hise Rock, a national historic landmark

- Elected member of the United States National Academy of Sciences in 1902.
- Elected member of the Royal Swedish Academy of Sciences in 1905.
- Elected member of the American Philosophical Society in 1909.
- Elected member of the American Academy of Arts and Sciences in 1911.
- Van Hise Hall on the University of Wisconsin campus at the intersection of Charter and Linden Streets is named after him.
- There is an elementary school in Madison named after him.

== Publications ==
- On secondary enlargements of mineral fragments in certain rocks with Roland Duer Irving. USGS Bulletin No. 8, 1884
- Correlation Papers . . . Archœan and Algonkian (1892)
- Principles of North American Pre-Cambrian Geology (1896)
- Some Principles Controlling the Deposition of Ores (1901)
- The Iron Ores of the Lake Superior Region (1901)
- An Attempt to Reduce the Phenomena of Rock Alterations to Order under the Laws of Energy (1903)
- A Treatise on Metamorphism Monograph 47, USGS, (1904). <https://doi.org/10.3133/m47>
- The Conservation of Natural Resources in the United States (1910). <https://scispace.com/pdf/the-conservation-of-natural-resources-in-the-united-states-1b1egaqvs3.pdf>
- Concentration and Control (1912; 2nd edition, 1915)
- Conservation and Regulation in the United States During the World War: An Outline for a Course of Lectures to be Given in Higher Educational Institutions, Part 1 (1917)
- Conservation and Regulation in the United States During the World War: An Outline for a Course of Lectures to be Given in Higher Educational Institutions, Part 2 (1918)
- "Some Economic Aspects of the World War",Science, Vol. 47, No. 1201 (Jan. 4, 1918), pp. 1-10. <https://www.jstor.org/stable/1643931>

Academic offices
Preceded by Edward Ashael Birge	President of the University of Wisconsin–Madison; 1903-1918	Succeeded by Edward Ashael Birge
