= Leidy Award =

The Leidy Award is a medal and prize presented by the Academy of Natural Sciences of Drexel University (formerly the Academy of Natural Sciences of Philadelphia), Philadelphia, Pennsylvania, USA. It was named after US palaeontologist Joseph Leidy. The award was established in 1923 to recognize excellence in "publications, explorations, discoveries or research in the natural sciences", and was intended to be presented every three years. The award consists of a rectangular bronze medal (decorated with a bust depiction of Leidy) and an honorarium which was initially $5000.

== Laureates ==
- 1925 – Herbert Spencer Jennings
- 1928 – Henry Augustus Pilsbry
- 1931 – William Morton Wheeler
- 1934 – Gerrit Smith Miller Jr.
- 1937 – Edwin Linton
- 1940 – Merritt Lyndon Fernald
- 1943 – Chancey Juday
- 1946 – Ernst Mayr
- 1949 – Warren Poppino Spencer
- 1952 – G. Evelyn Hutchinson
- 1955 – Herbert Friedmann
- 1958 – Herbert Barker Hungerford
- 1961 – Robert Evans Snodgrass
- 1964 – Carl Leavitt Hubbs
- 1967 – Donn Eric Rosen
- 1970 – Arthur Cronquist
- 1975 – James Bond
- 1979 – Edward Osborne Wilson
- 1983 – G. Ledyard Stebbins
- 1985 – Hampton Carson
- 1989 – Daniel H. Janzen
- 1994 – Peter and Rosemary Grant
- 2006 – David B. Wake
- 2009 – Dan Otte
- 2010 – Tim Flannery
- 2012 – Douglas Futuyma

== See also ==
- List of general science and technology awards
- List of biology awards
- List of earth sciences awards
- List of paleontology awards
