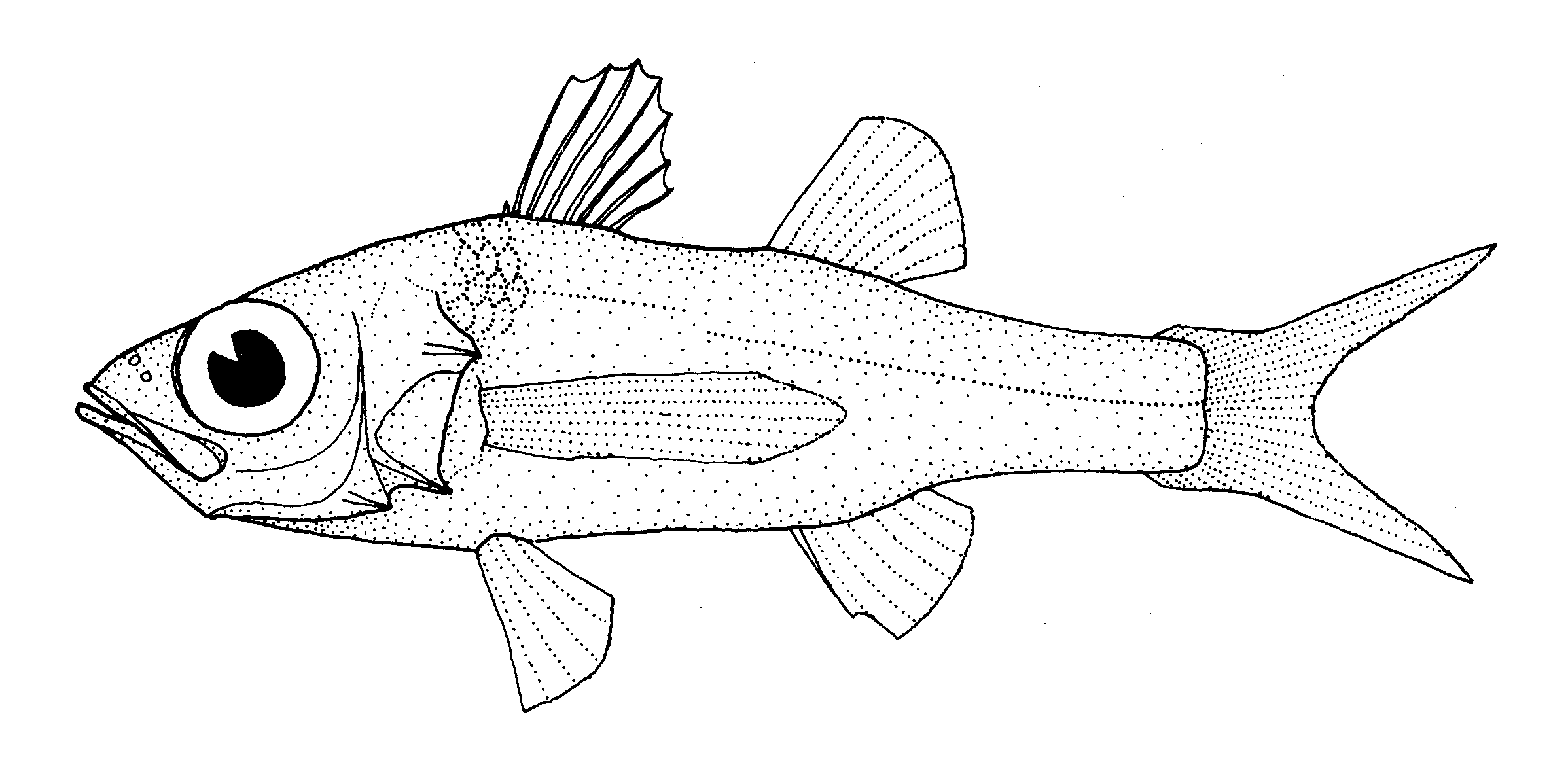
- Drawing by Tony Ayling

Scientific classification
- Kingdom: Animalia
- Phylum: Chordata
- Class: Actinopterygii
- Order: Acropomatiformes
- Family: Howellidae
- Genus: Howella
- Species: H. brodiei

Binomial name
- Howella brodiei J. D. Ogilby, 1899

Synonyms
- Howella brodiei brodiei J. D. Ogilby, 1899

= Pelagic basslet =

Species of ray-finned fish

The pelagic basslet (Howella brodiei) is an oceanic basslet native to the Indo-Pacific, where it occurs at depths from 100 to 1,829 m (328 to 6,001 ft). This species is an openwater fish, staying deeper (below 305 m (1,001 ft)) during the day and moving to shallower waters. This species can reach 7.6 cm (3.0 in) in TL.
