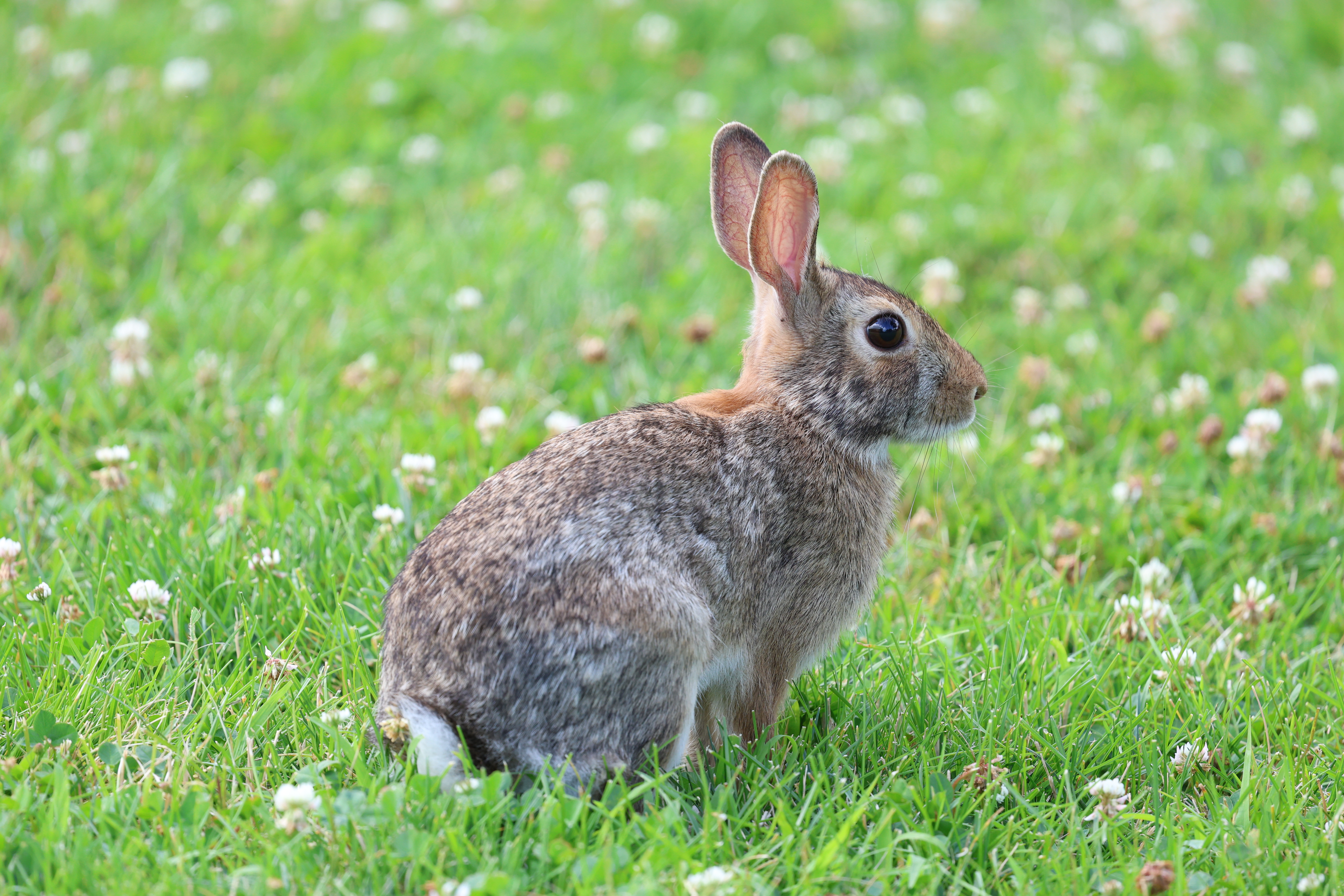
- Adult eastern cottontail (Sylvilagus floridanus) foraging in University of Wisconsin–Madison Lakeshore Nature Preserve

Conservation status
- Least Concern (IUCN 3.1)

- Secure (NatureServe)

Scientific classification
- Kingdom: Animalia
- Phylum: Chordata
- Class: Mammalia
- Infraclass: Placentalia
- Order: Lagomorpha
- Family: Leporidae
- Genus: Sylvilagus
- Species: S. floridanus

Binomial name
- Sylvilagus floridanus (J. A. Allen, 1890)
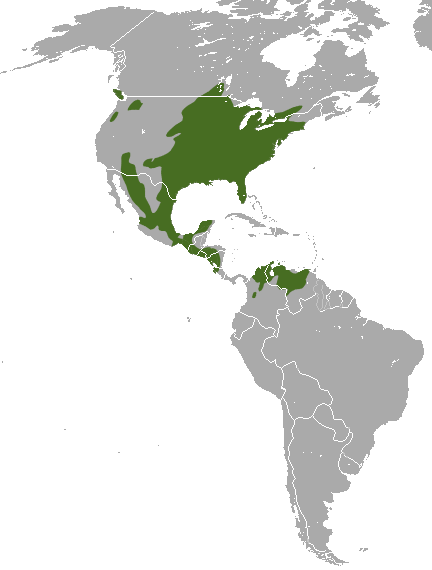
- Eastern cottontail range (includes range of S. holzneri)

= Eastern cottontail =

Eastern cottontail Temporal range: Pleistocene to recent

Species of rabbit in the genus Sylvilagus

The eastern cottontail (Sylvilagus floridanus) is a species of rabbit in the family Leporidae. It is the most widespread and abundant rabbit species in North America, inhabiting a wide range that extends from southern Canada throughout most of the United States and into parts of Mexico, Central America, and the northern regions of South America. Known for its distinctive fluffy white tail, which resembles a cotton ball and gives the species its common name, the eastern cottontail typically inhabits open fields, meadows, and brushy areas where it can easily find cover and food. It is a primarily herbivorous, crepuscular mammal that feeds on grasses, herbs, twigs, and bark, and plays an important role in the ecosystem as prey for a variety of predators including foxes, hawks, and owls. Due to its adaptability to human-altered landscapes such as suburban and agricultural areas, the eastern cottontail has maintained stable population levels and is not considered threatened. It is also well known for its high reproductive rate, with females capable of producing multiple large litters annually, which contributes to its widespread presence.

== Taxonomy ==
Sylvilagus floridanus is a member of the family Leporidae within the order Lagomorpha. It was first formally described by French naturalist Charles Alexandre Lesueur in 1827. The genus Sylvilagus includes around 15 species of New World cottontail rabbits, which are widespread throughout the Americas.

=== Subspecies ===
There are at least 17 recognized subspecies of Sylvilagus floridanus, distinguished mainly by geographic distribution and minor morphological differences. These subspecies are generally grouped by region:

- North of Mexico
  - Sylvilagus floridanus alacer
  - Sylvilagus floridanus chapmani
  - Sylvilagus floridanus floridanus
  - Sylvilagus floridanus mallurus
- Mexico and Central America
  - Sylvilagus floridanus aztecus
  - Sylvilagus floridanus connectens
  - Sylvilagus floridanus hondurensis
  - Sylvilagus floridanus macrocorpus
  - Sylvilagus floridanus orizabae
  - Sylvilagus floridanus yucatanicus
- South of Isthmus of Panama
  - Sylvilagus floridanus avius
  - Sylvilagus floridanus continentis
  - Sylvilagus floridanus cumanicus
  - Sylvilagus floridanus margaritae
  - Sylvilagus floridanus nigronuchalis
  - Sylvilagus floridanus orinoci
  - Sylvilagus floridanus purgatus
  - Sylvilagus floridanus superciliaris

Morphological and genetic variation across populations reflect adaptation to diverse environments, with some populations showing notable differences in size, coloration, and behavior.

== Etymology ==
The genus name Sylvilagus is derived from Latin silva, meaning "forest" or "woodland," and lagus, a form adapted from Ancient Greek: λαγώς : lagṓs, meaning "hare" or "rabbit," thus translating roughly to "woodland hare."

The species epithet floridanus means "of Florida," referencing the region where the species was first scientifically identified.

=== Evolution and phylogeny ===
The eastern cottontail belongs to the Leporidae family, which includes all rabbits and hares. Within this family, Sylvilagus is a New World genus that diverged from Old World rabbits and hares millions of years ago.

Molecular and morphological studies have identified several distinct species and subspecies within Sylvilagus, highlighting a complex evolutionary history shaped by geographic isolation and environmental adaptation. Separate populations of the eastern cottontail found in different regions display markedly different genetic compositions, which may factor into their adaptability to diverse habitats.

Fossil records and genetic data suggest the eastern cottontail expanded its range following the last glacial period, taking advantage of cleared forest landscapes and open habitats.

== Description ==
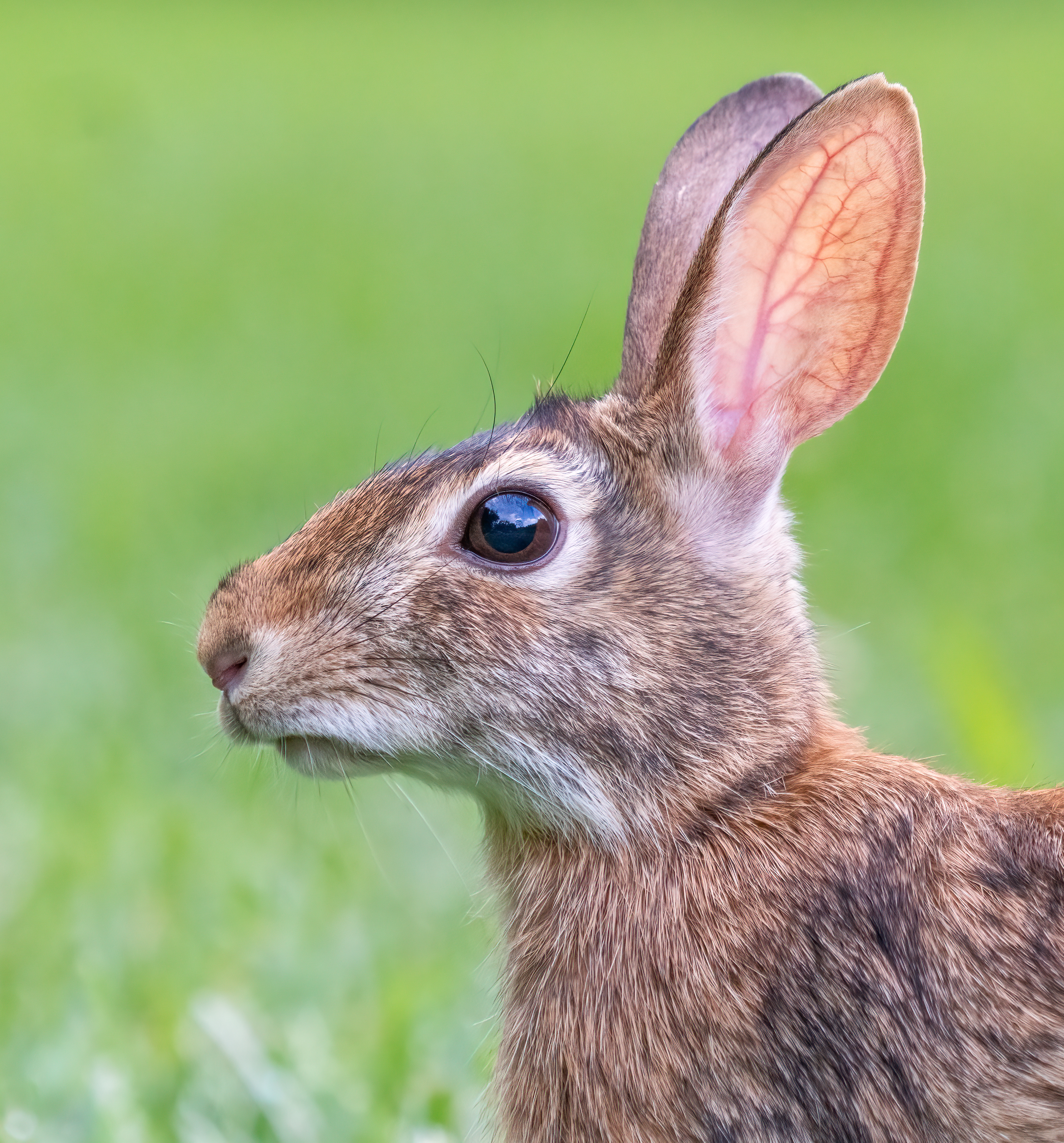
Eastern cottontail in Brooklyn, New York, United States

The eastern cottontail has a distinctive white spot on its forehead when young and fur that ranges from reddish-brown to grayish-brown, with large hind feet, long ears, and a short, fluffy white tail. Its underside is white, and there is a rusty patch near the tail. It differs from a hare in its overall smaller size and brownish-gray coloring around the head and neck, with a lighter-colored body and a white underside on the tail. The species also has large brown eyes and long ears adapted for detecting predators. During winter, the eastern cottontail's pelage becomes more gray than brown. Kits (young rabbits) develop a similar coloring after a few weeks but are born with a white blaze running down their forehead, which fades as they mature.

This rabbit is medium-sized, measuring 36–48 cm (14–19 in) in total length, including a tail that averages 5.3 cm (2.1 in).

Adults typically weigh between 1.8 and 4.4 lb (800 and 2,000 g), with an average of around 2.6 lb (1,200 g). Females tend to be slightly heavier than males, although the sexes broadly overlap in size. The species exhibits slight geographic variation in body size, with individuals generally increasing in mass from southern to northern latitudes, in line with Bergmann's rule. For example, adult specimens from the Florida Museum of Natural History have a mean weight of 2.24 lb (1.018 kg), whereas a study of 346 adults from Michigan found an average mass of 3.19 lb (1.445 kg).

== Range and habitat ==
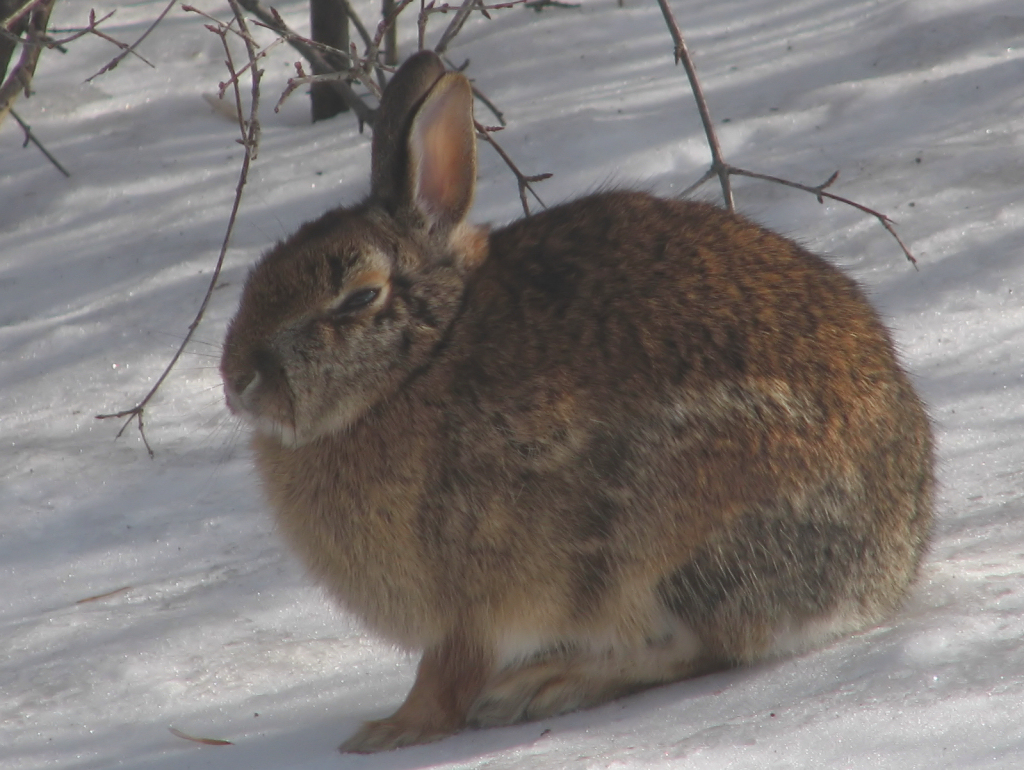
Eastern cottontail in winter coat, Ottawa, Ontario, Canada

The eastern cottontail inhabits meadows, shrubby areas, and edge habitats throughout the eastern and south-central United States, southern Canada, eastern Mexico, Central America, and northernmost South America. It is also present on Margarita Island in the Caribbean. The species is especially abundant across the Midwest of North America, and its range expanded northward as forests were cleared by settlers. Originally absent from New England, it has since been introduced there, where it now competes with the native New England cottontail (Sylvilagus transitionalis). It has also been introduced to parts of Oregon, Washington, and British Columbia. In the 1950s and 1960s, the species was introduced to France and northern Italy, where it underwent rapid territorial expansion and population growth. It was also introduced to Cuba at some point, most likely from the United States in the early 20th century when massive efforts were being made to introduce new species to the island.

Populations in the mountainous regions of the southwestern United States and western Mexico are now considered a separate species, the robust cottontail (S. holzneri).

Optimal eastern cottontail habitat includes open grassy areas, clearings, and old fields that support abundant green vegetation, with shrubs or hedgerows providing cover. Critical habitat components include dense, well-distributed escape cover interspersed with open foraging areas such as pastures or grasslands. In the western United States, they occupy diverse habitats such as ponderosa pine, mixed conifer, and pinyon (Pinus spp.)–juniper (Juniperus spp.) woodlands, where woody debris, shrubby understories, and patchy cover are important for survival. Eastern cottontails also thrive in agricultural and suburban environments, especially near fencerows, forest edges, and thickets. They can be found in swamps and marshes but generally avoid dense forests.

== Behavior and ecology ==
The eastern cottontail is a territorial species that relies on speed and agility to evade predators. When chased, it typically escapes in a zigzag pattern and can reach speeds of up to 18 mph (29 km/h). Cottontails favor habitats where they can feed in the open but quickly retreat to cover when threatened. Preferred environments include forest edges, swamps, brushy thickets, hedgerows, and open fields with nearby shelter. Instead of digging burrows, eastern cottontails rest in a form—a shallow, scratched-out depression in grass or beneath dense vegetation—and may use groundhog (Marmota monax) burrows during severe weather or heavy snow.

Eastern cottontails are mostly crepuscular and nocturnal, foraging primarily at dawn, dusk, and night. However, they can be seen during the day, particularly in overcast or foggy conditions. They spend much of the daytime resting under vegetative cover and often remain motionless for extended periods to avoid detection. Activity is year-round, as the species does not hibernate.

=== Home range ===
Eastern cottontail home ranges are roughly circular in open and uniform habitats. Individuals generally remain within the same range throughout life, although shifts can occur due to weather or vegetation changes. In New England, home ranges average 1.4 acres (0.57 hectares) for males and 1.2 acres (0.49 hectares) for females but can vary between 0.5 to 40 acres (0.20 to 16.19 hectares) depending on habitat quality and season. Male home ranges expand during the breeding season, with spring ranges in southwestern Wisconsin averaging 6.9 acres (2.8 hectares) and peaking at 10 acres (4.0 hectares) in early summer before decreasing again in late summer. Daily movements usually cover only 10–20% of their total range.

In southeastern Wisconsin, male ranges overlapped by up to 50%, while females overlapped less than 25%. Females defend the immediate area around their nest, whereas males compete aggressively for dominance and access to mates.

=== Cover requirements ===
Brush piles, thickets, stone walls, and dense herbaceous growth are crucial for shelter and predator avoidance. Eastern cottontails rarely dig burrows except when constructing nests, preferring abandoned dens of other animals, such as woodchucks. Seasonal cover use changes with plant availability: in winter, when deciduous vegetation is bare, they rely heavily on woody cover. In Florida pine flatwoods, they use low patches of saw palmetto (Serenoa repens) as cover.

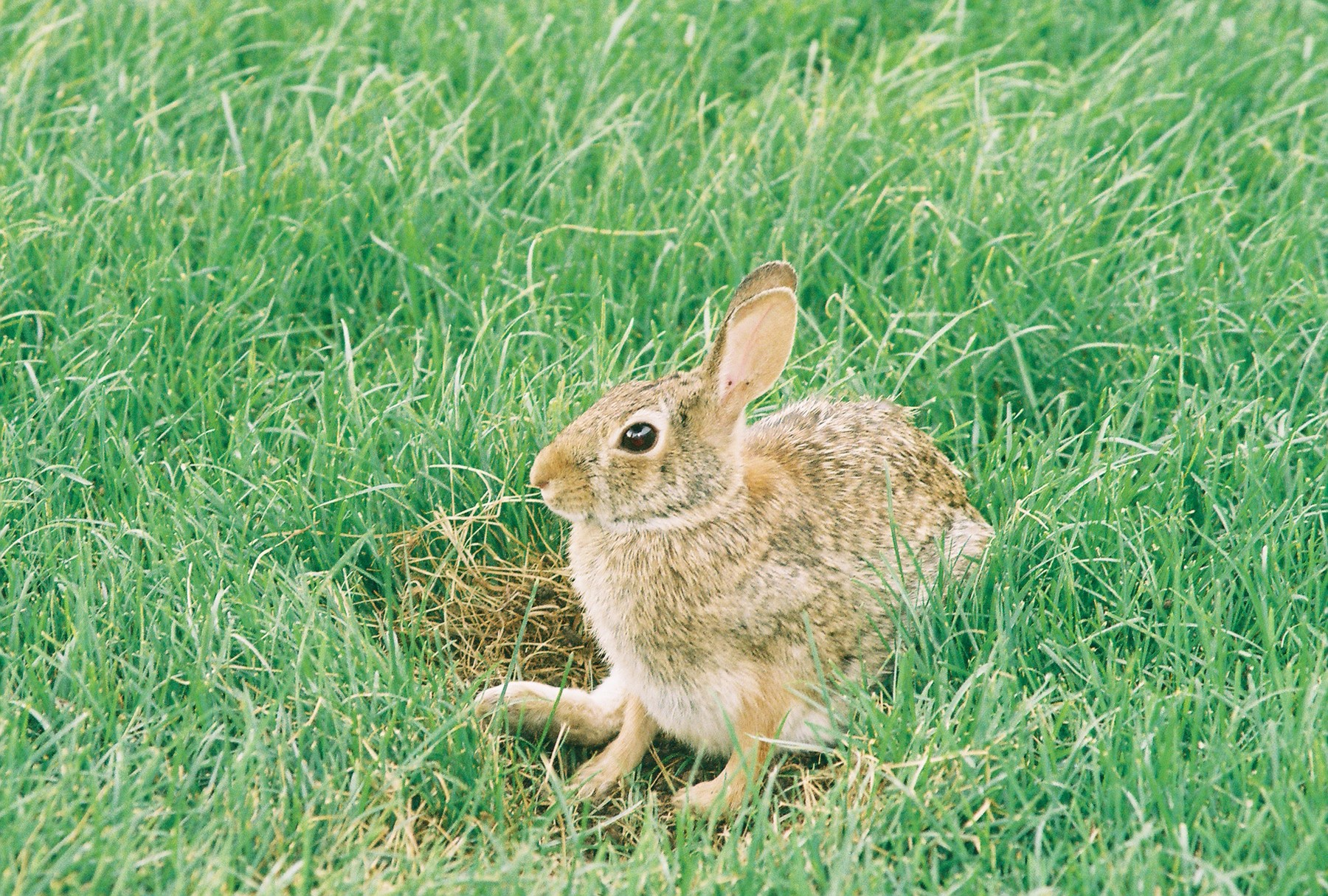
Eastern cottontail in its nest

Nests are usually built in grassy fields, hayfields, or weedy areas near brushy cover. In Iowa, nests were most commonly found within 70 yd (64 m) of shrubs in herbaceous vegetation at least 4 in (10 cm) tall. The average nest cavity is 5 in (13 cm) deep, 5 in (13 cm) wide, and 7 in (18 cm) long, and is lined with dry grasses and the mother's fur.

=== Reproduction ===
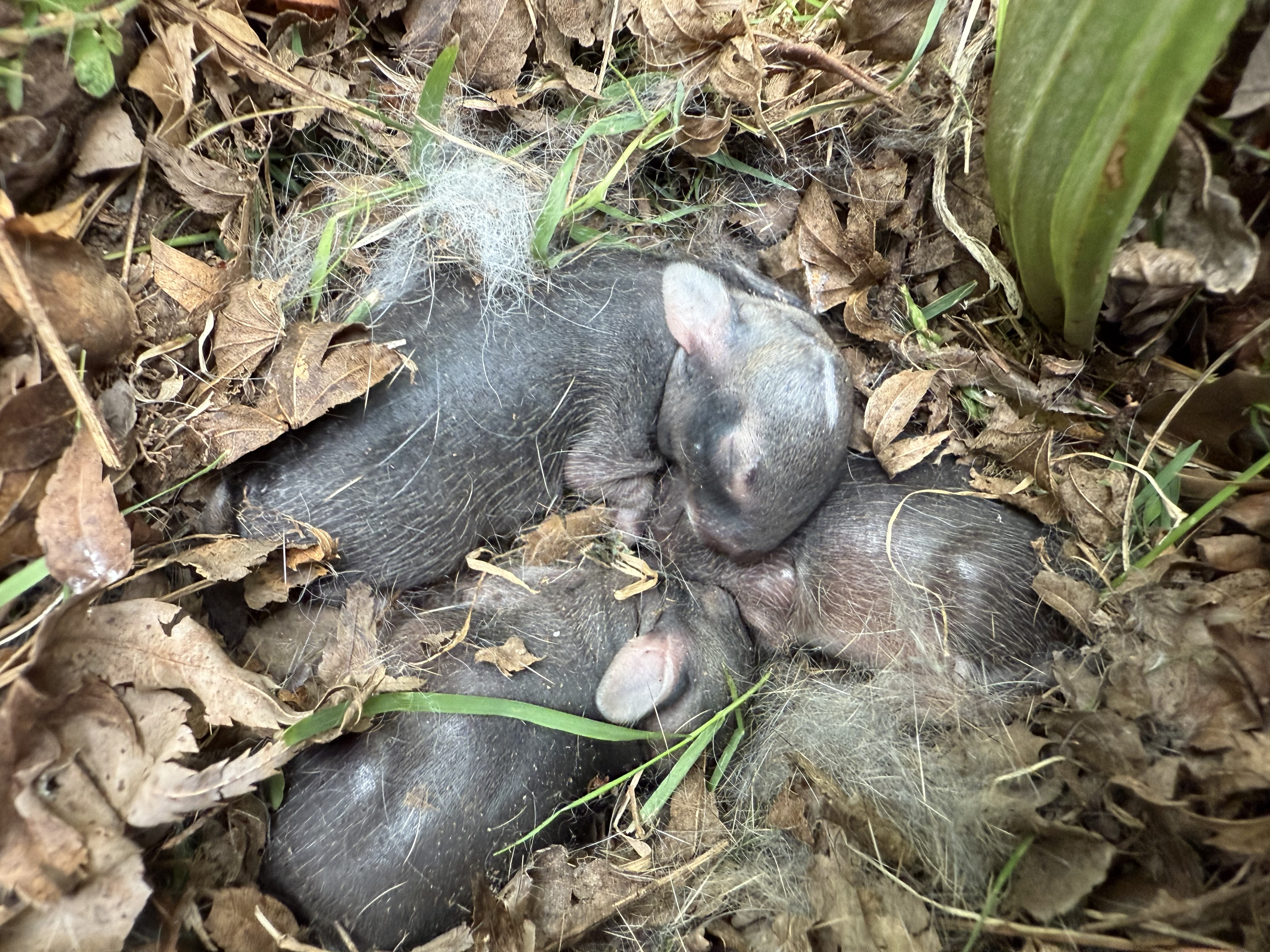
Litter and nesting material

Eastern cottontails reach sexual maturity at 2–3 months of age. Breeding season varies by latitude and climate, beginning as early as January in the southern United States and around March in New England, continuing through late summer. Mating is promiscuous, with males competing for access to females.

The nest is typically a slanted hole in soft soil lined with fur and grasses, measuring about 7.1 in × 4.9 in × 4.7 in (18 cm × 12 cm × 12 cm). Gestation lasts 25–35 days (average 28). Kits are born blind with fine hair and a white blaze on the forehead, which fades as they mature. Their eyes open at 4–7 days, and they begin leaving the nest by 12–16 days. Weaning occurs by 4–5 weeks, and dispersal begins around 7 weeks.

Females can have 1–7 litters per year (averaging 3–4), with 3–8 kits per litter (average 5). In southern states, breeding is nearly continuous, while northern populations have shorter seasons but larger litters.

=== Diet ===
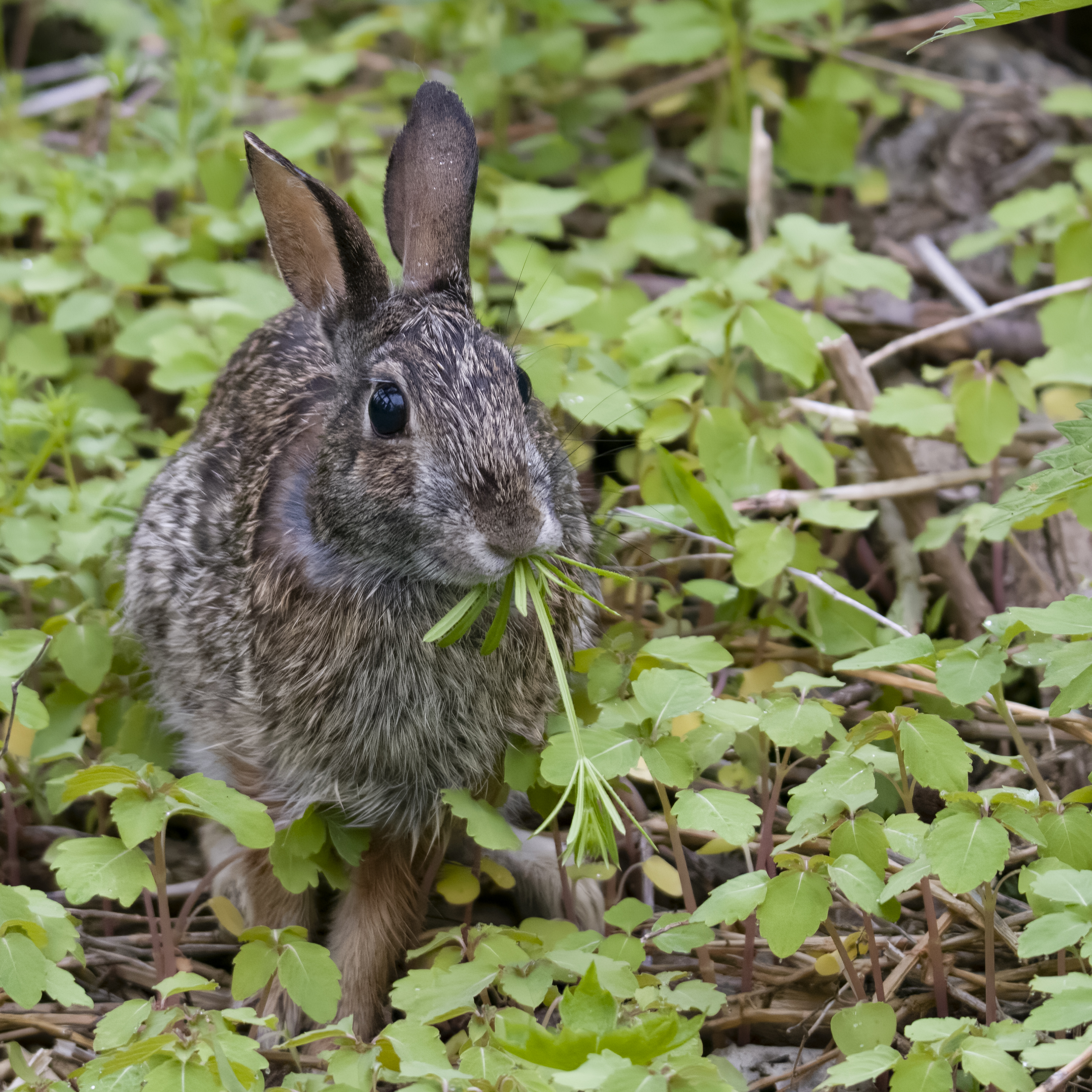
An eastern cottontail feeding in Magee Marsh Wildlife Area

Eastern cottontails feed primarily on a wide variety of plants, with some studies documenting 70–145 plant species in their diet. They prefer tender herbaceous vegetation, such as grasses, clovers (Trifolium spp.), crabgrasses (Digitaria spp.), and wild rye (Elymus spp.). In Connecticut, their summer diet includes alfalfa, timothy (Phleum pratense), quackgrass (Elytrigia repens), ragweed (Ambrosia psilostachya), goldenrod (Solidago spp.), plantains (Plantago spp.), chickweed (Stellaria media), and dandelion (Taraxacum officinale).

During winter or when snow covers vegetation, cottontails browse on twigs, buds, and bark of woody plants such as gray birch (Betula populifolia), red maple (Acer rubrum), and smooth sumac (Rhus glabra). They are also coprophagous, re-ingesting soft fecal pellets to extract additional nutrients.

=== Mortality ===
In Kansas, the leading cause of mortality among radiotracked eastern cottontails was predation (43%), followed by deaths related to the research process (19%) and tularemia (18%). A significant source of mortality is collisions with vehicles. In Missouri, it has been estimated that approximately ten eastern cottontails are killed annually per mile of road, with the peak of highway mortality occurring in spring (March through May), when roadside vegetation greens up before adjacent fields and attracts rabbits to the roadside.

Annual adult survival is estimated to be around 20%. Average lifespan in the wild is about 15 months, though the longest-lived recorded wild individual reached five years. In captivity, eastern cottontails have lived up to nine years.

Eastern cottontails host a variety of ectoparasites and endoparasites, including fleas, ticks, lice, cestodes, nematodes, and trematodes. They are also susceptible to parasitism by gray flesh fly larvae, botfly larvae, and diseases such as tularemia, Shope's fibroma virus, torticollis, and cutaneous streptothricosis. A comprehensive summary of eastern cottontail diseases and parasites is provided by Chapman et al.

==== Predators ====
The eastern cottontail is preyed upon by a wide variety of natural and introduced predators, forming a significant part of the diets of many carnivores and raptors in eastern North America. Common predators include domestic cats (Felis catus) and dogs (Canis lupus familiaris), foxes (Vulpes and Urocyon spp.), coyote (C. latrans), bobcat (Lynx rufus), weasels (Mustela spp.), raccoon (Procyon lotor), mink (Neogale vison), great horned owl (Bubo virginianus), barred owl (Strix varia), hawks (particularly Buteo spp.), corvids (Corvus spp.), and various snakes.

Nestlings are especially vulnerable to predation by raccoons, badgers (Taxidea taxus), skunks (Mephitis and Spilogale spp.), crows (Corvus brachyrhynchos), and Virginia opossums (Didelphis virginiana). In central Missouri, eastern cottontails made up the majority of prey biomass consumed by red-tailed hawks (Buteo jamaicensis) during the nesting season. In Pennsylvania, the great horned owl is considered the primary predator.

In the Southwest, eastern cottontails comprise between 7% and 25% of the diet of the American goshawk (Astur atricapillus). In Texas, they are most heavily preyed upon by coyotes in early spring and fall. In southwestern North Dakota, eastern and desert cottontails (Sylvilagus auduboni) are a key prey item for bobcats.

Juveniles are rarely taken by short-eared owls (Asio flammeus), and only trace remains of eastern cottontails have been detected in the scat of black bears (Ursus americanus).

== Conservation ==
The eastern cottontail species, due to its abundance and large, expanding range, is not considered to be under any threat. Individual populations may face local habitat loss. The species is considered "secure" by NatureServe and is listed as least-concern by the International Union for Conservation of Nature.
