= Pseudohowella =

Scientific classification
- Kingdom: Animalia
- Phylum: Chordata
- Class: Actinopterygii
- Order: Acropomatiformes
- Family: Howellidae
- Genus: Pseudohowella; Fedoryako, 1976
- Species: P. intermedia

Binomial name
- Pseudohowella intermedia Fedoryako, 1976

Species of ray-finned fish

Pseudohowella intermedia is a species of oceanic basslet known from the deep ocean near to Papua New Guinea and Hawaii. It can be found at depths from 100 to 700 m (330 to 2,300 ft). This species is the only known member of its genus.
