= Lake Mendota Boathouse =

Former boathouse in Madison, Wisconsin

Coordinates: 43.0775°N 89.388056°W

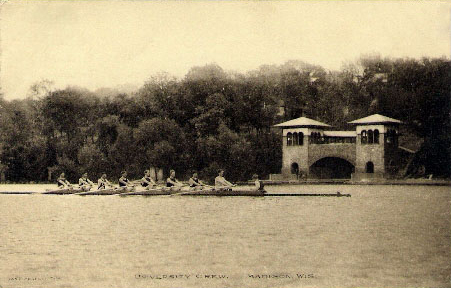
Circa 1920

The Lake Mendota Boathouse was a recreational building and storage facility owned by the University of Wisconsin located on Lake Mendota in Madison, Wisconsin. It was designed and built by architect Frank Lloyd Wright after he was awarded the commission of the building in 1893 based on drawings he submitted to a competition held by the Madison Park and Pleasure Drive Association. The primary functions of the building were to store recreational equipment and to serve as a viewing deck for "boating events and races that took place on the lake."

The design of the building consisted of two brick towers topped with Wright's classic Prairie School style roofs which were visible on the lake side of the building. On the opposite side of the building, a semicircular loggia made up the facade and the entrance on the street. Arches were used throughout the structure, including arched windows adorning each side of the towers in sets of three, arched doorways at the base of each tower on the shoreline, and a large arch situated in the center.

The boathouse stood on its site on North Carroll Street in the Mansion Hill Historic District for 33 years until it was demolished in 1926.

== See also ==
- List of Frank Lloyd Wright works

== General references ==
- Storrer, William Allin (1993). The Frank Lloyd Wright Companion. Chicago: University of Chicago Press. ISBN 978-0-226-77624-8. (S.022)
- Sprague, Paul (1990). Frank Lloyd Wright and Madison. Madison, Wisconsin: Elvehjem Museum of Art/University of Wisconsin. pp. 29–35.
