= Bathysphyraenops =

Scientific classification
- Kingdom: Animalia
- Phylum: Chordata
- Class: Actinopterygii
- Division: Teleostei
- Order: Acropomatiformes
- Family: Howellidae
- Genus: Bathysphyraenops; A. E. Parr, 1933

Type species
- Bathysphyraenops simplex A. E. Parr, 1933

Synonyms
- Schistoperca Fowler, 1943

Genus of ray-finned fishes

Bathysphyraenops is a genus of ray-finned fish in the family Howellidae, the oceanic basslets. They are native to the deep waters of the tropical oceans.

== Species ==
The currently recognized species in this genus are:

- Bathysphyraenops declivifrons Fedoryako, 1976
- Bathysphyraenops simplex A. E. Parr, 1933

== See also ==
- Howellidae
- Ray-finned fish
- Oceanic basslets
- Deep-sea fish
- Deep sea
- Genus
