= Robert Evans Snodgrass =

American entomologist

- At the US Bureau of Entomology, 1932
- Born: July 5, 1875
- Died: September 4, 1962 (aged 87)
- Occupation: entomologist

Robert Evans Snodgrass (July 5, 1875 – September 4, 1962) was an American entomologist and artist who made important contributions to the fields of arthropod morphology, anatomy, evolution, and metamorphosis.

He was the author of 76 scientific articles and six books, including Insects, Their Ways and Means of Living (1930) and the book considered to be his crowning achievement, the Principles of Insect Morphology (1935).

== Biography ==
Snodgrass was born in St. Louis, Missouri on July 5, 1875, to Annie Elizabeth Evans and James Cathcart Snodgrass, where he lived until he was eight years old. He was the oldest of three children. His admitted first ambition in life was to be a railway engineer or a Pullman conductor, though frequent visits to the St. Louis Zoo aroused his early interests in zoology. His first recollections of entomology were recorded by E.B. Thurman:

The first entomological observation which Dr. Snodgrass recalls is seeing that the legs of grasshoppers, cut off by his father's lawnmower, could still kick while lying on the pavement. This apparently mysterious fact made a strong impression on him, and he decided that sometime he would look into the matter.

In 1883, he and his family moved to Wetmore, Kansas, where his father worked in a local bank, and young Snodgrass began work as a self-taught taxidermist. He had a particular interest in birds, even expressing a desire to become an ornithologist, though his family only allowed limited shooting of birds for his mounted collections. At age 15, the family again moved, this time to Ontario, California, where they settled on a 20-acre (81,000 m^{2}) ranch and grew oranges, prunes, and grapes. It was here that Snodgrass entered a Methodist preparatory school at the high school level, then known as Chaffey College. He studied Latin, Greek, French, German, physics, chemistry, and drawing, but notably no biology because the curriculum forbade involving the teaching of evolution. Snodgrass bypassed this problem by reading the English scientists Charles Darwin, Thomas Henry Huxley and Herbert Spencer in his free time. His openly professed belief in evolution caused him problems in his relationships at home, and eventually resulted in being expelled from church activities in his community.

In 1895, at the age of 20, Snodgrass entered Stanford University and majored in zoology, taking classes such as general zoology, embryology, entomology with Dr. Vernon Lyman Kellogg, ichthyology with then Stanford president Dr. David Starr Jordan, and comparative vertebrate anatomy. His first opportunity to conduct research came from Dr. Kellogg, who set him to work on the biting lice (Mallophaga). The excitement of research, and the prospect for publishing original work led to his giving up the desire to become an ornithologist, and the publication of his first two science articles (works 1, 2). During this time, Snodgrass also participated in his first two field expeditions, the first to the Pribilof Islands of Alaska led by Dr. Jordan, and the second to the Galápagos Islands, led by Edmund Heller. Snodgrass eventually published seven papers with Heller regarding organisms collected during the Galapagos expedition (works 3, 5, 6, 7, 12, 16, 19). Snodgrass graduated from Stanford University with his A.B. degree in Zoology in 1901.

He was awarded the 1961 Leidy Award from the Academy of Natural Sciences of Philadelphia.

== See also ==
- Category:Taxa named by Robert Evans Snodgrass
