= Lake Mendota =

Lake in Dane County, Wisconsin

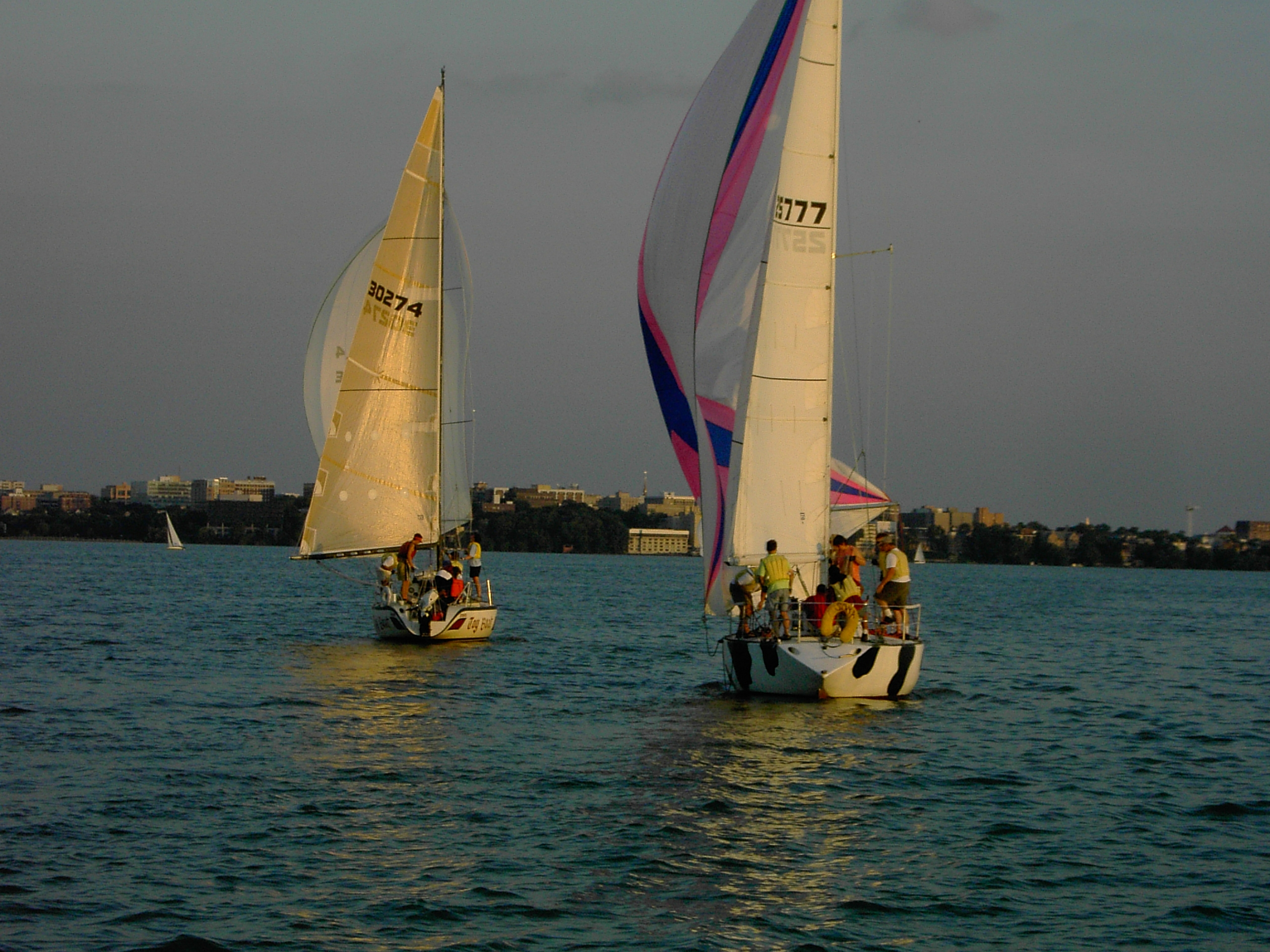
- Boats headed toward south shore in Madison

- Location within Wisconsin Location within the United States
- Location: Dane County, Wisconsin, U.S.
- Coordinates: 43°06′24″N 89°25′29″W
- Type: Natural freshwater lake
- Primary inflows: Yahara River
- Primary outflows: Yahara River
- Catchment area: 562 km^{2} (217 sq mi)
- Basin countries: United States
- Max. length: 5.62 mi (9.04 km)
- Max. width: 4.11 mi (6.61 km)
- Surface area: 9,740 acres (3,940 ha) (39.4 sq. km)
- Average depth: 12.8 m (42 ft)
- Max. depth: 25.3 m (83 ft)
- Water volume: 500 million cubic metres (18×10^{9} cu ft)
- Residence time: 4.5 years
- Shore length^{1}: 21.6 mi (34.8 km)
- Surface elevation: 259 m (850 ft)
- Frozen: December 20 (average freezing date)
- Settlements: Madison, Middleton, Shorewood Hills, Maple Bluff, Westport
- ^{1} Shore length is not a well-defined measure.

Lake Mendota is a freshwater eutrophic lake that is the northernmost and largest of the four lakes in Madison, Wisconsin. The lake borders Madison on the north, east, and south, Middleton on the west, Shorewood Hills on the southwest, Maple Bluff on the northeast, and Westport on the northwest. The lake was historically known as Wąąkšikhomįkra (Where the Person Rests) by the Ho-Chunk people. Lake Mendota acquired its present name in 1849 following a proposal by a surveyor named Frank Hudson, who claimed to be familiar with local Native American languages; Lyman C. Draper, the first corresponding secretary of the Wisconsin Historical Society, proposed that 'Mendota' could have been a Chippewa word meaning 'large' or 'great.'

== Early history ==
Lake Mendota originated after the Wisconsin glaciation, which occurred approximately 15,000 years ago. Glacial ice, which had covered the Madison lakes (Lakes Mendota, Monona, Kegonsa, and Waubesa) at a thickness of over 300 meters, began to retreat northwest about 14,000 years ago, damming a glacial lake near the City of Middleton that now serves as the source of water for Pheasant Branch, a creek that drains from the east into Lake Mendota. Water left behind by the retreating glaciers eventually filled the current lake bed of Lake Mendota. Although a large lake that stretched from the northern part of Lake Mendota down to Stoughton did exist for about 1,000 years, falling water levels caused this large lake to separate into the four current Madison lakes about 10,000 years ago, leaving numerous shallow-water marshes between those lakes.

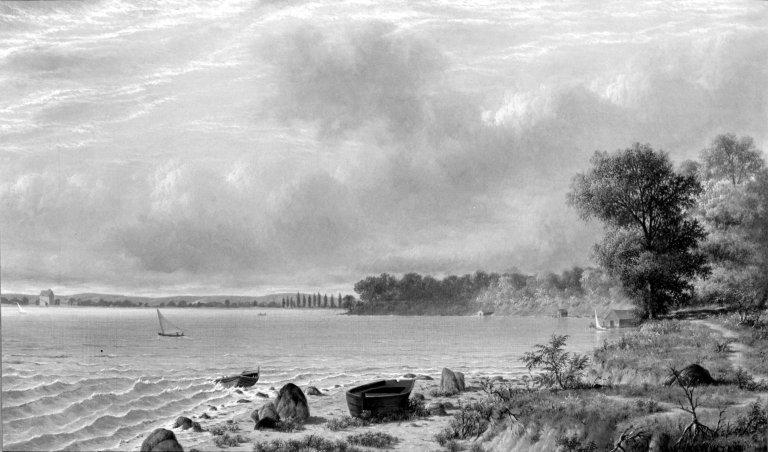
Lake Mendota, Madison, Wisconsin, a painting by Joseph Rusling Meeker, c. 1870-71

According to reports from European settlers in the early nineteenth century, Lake Mendota once had white sand beaches and clear water, with the sand being calcium carbonate, which continually entered the lake from its gypsum-rich watershed. However, after American settlers began to populate Madison, the physical characteristics of the once-mesotrophic lake began to rapidly change. This was largely due to the Tenney Locks, which were constructed in 1849 to regulate shipping through the Madison Isthmus and led to a four-foot increase in the water level in Lake Mendota, submerging the beaches. Additionally, due to the growth of the Wisconsin dairy industry in the late nineteenth century, Lake Mendota was repeatedly inundated with runoff from nearby farms that caused the lake bed to become dark black, the color of prairie soil. The resulting spikes in the concentrations of nitrogen and phosphorus turned Lake Mendota into a eutrophic lake. The degree of eutrophication was so high that in 1882, Edward Asahel Birge, a young zoologist and future president of the University of Wisconsin-Madison, documented Lake Mendota's first known toxic cyanobacterial blooms in conjunction with his collaborator Chancey Juday, marking the first step toward long-term studies of Lake Mendota.

== Geography ==
Lake Mendota and Lake Monona are separated by an isthmus known as the Madison Isthmus, on which the majority of Madison, WI, is located. While the lakes are separated by dry ground, they are connected by the Yahara River. Navigation along this portion of the Yahara River is controlled by the Tenney Park Lock and Dam, which was constructed to allow shallow drafting boats to cross this dredged section of river through what was once wetlands. Today, the Tenney Park Locks also help to maintain water levels in the Madison lakes, as under normal conditions, the water level in Lake Mendota is kept five feet above that in Lake Monona. By contrast, when water levels are too high, the Tenney Park Dam is closed to minimize flow from Lake Mendota into Lake Monona and Lake Waubesa, while when water levels are too low, all the dams along the Yahara River are opened to maximize water flow. In early 2021, Dane County obtained an Ellicott 'Dragon Dredge' as a means of reducing the consequences of flooding from the Yahara River and the Madison lakes by removing silt and muck deposits that have accumulated for decades at choke points between the lakes. This acquisition was part of a multi-million dollar flood mitigation effort led by Dane County Executive Joe Parisi dating back to 2019, when historic rains inundated creeks and caused the waters of Lake Monona to rise to their highest levels in over a century, that would allow Dane County to more efficiently move large volumes of water between the Madison lakes to avoid similar catastrophic impacts from flooding.

The banks of the lake largely contain expensive luxury homes and condominiums, but they also contain protected natural areas and parks, including James Madison Park, Governor Nelson State Park, as well as UW-Madison housing, the Memorial Union, and a handful of hotels and restaurants. There are at least 25 boat launching sites and several major marinas serving the Yahara chain of lakes. The city of Madison maintains five beaches on Lake Mendota, three of which are staffed with lifeguards. On a typical summer day, the lake is filled with those engaging in water sports, including boating, fishing, water skiing, wakeboarding, tubing, canoeing, windsurfing, kayaking, and sailing. With an average freeze date of December 20, Lake Mendota is used in the winter by sports enthusiasts for ice boating, ice skating, ice fishing, cross-country skiing, ice hockey and snowkiting.

The Wisconsin State Capitol and much of the state government is located on the narrow Madison Isthmus, and the University of Wisconsin–Madison campus is situated along the southern shore of Lake Mendota. In the early 20th century, Chancey Juday and Edward A. Birge founded an influential school of limnology there as a component of the university, which was reorganized and expanded into the Center for Limnology in July 1982. The university's Hoofer Sailing Club operates at the Memorial Union.

== Lake study ==
Lake Mendota has been called "the most studied lake in the world," with the UW–Madison Center for Limnology resting on its southern bank. The lake has a remote sensor buoy, affectionately known as 'David Buoy,' that is part of the Global Lake Ecological Observatory Network. The buoy was first anchored in Lake Mendota in 2008 and has collected data in each subsequent year from early spring until late fall, when it is removed before the lake freezes in the winter. Several of the lake and atmospheric data collected by the buoy include wind direction, wind speed, air temperature, dissolved oxygen, and chlorophyll. In March 2021, researchers from the Center for Limnology concluded that climate change and the associated lengthening of summer weather have driven the annual formation of dead zones in Lake Mendota, which are oxygen-deficient layers deep in the water column. These dead zones have been shown to remain in the lake for up to two months in the summer and have the potential to devastate the habitats of benthic fish. The increasing eutrophication of Lake Mendota has led to an increased frequency of harmful algal blooms, which sink to the bottom of the lake when they die. Once at the bottom, they are broken down by decomposers via a process that requires oxygen, thus depleting the benthic supply of oxygen and forming dead zones. In the absence of programs designed to mitigate climate change locally, the researchers indicated that the only way to reduce the frequency and severity of the dead zones is to limit the amount of fertilizer and nutrients that flow into Lake Mendota.

On September 11, 2009, the invasive spiny water flea was discovered by the limnology class at the University of Wisconsin–Madison, making it the third known inland lake to harbor this species in Wisconsin. Scientists from the Long Term Ecological Research Network had initially believed that Lake Mendota was an unsuitable habitat for the spiny water flea, which prefers cold lakes, as limnologists from the North Temperate Lakes site of the LTER had conducted over three decades of sampling trips into the lake and had never found a single spiny water flea. However, after extracting sediment cores from Lake Mendota and analyzing them at the UW–Madison Zoological Museum, researchers found evidence that spiny water fleas had been present in low concentrations in the lake for at least a decade before their sudden population increase in 2009. This conforms with recent research proposing that invasive species can spend years or decades as "sleeper populations," remaining at low population densities until environmental conditions become favorable for explosive population growth, at which point they are detected by researchers. In 2015, a reproducing population of invasive zebra mussels was found in Lake Mendota, which generated concern among ecologists because the mussels have been linked to increases in the frequency of cyanobacteria blooms and beach closures.

== Biodiversity ==
Lake Mendota, like the other lakes in the Yahara River chain, contains many native aquatic plant species, which are the primary producers of the lake and serve as the foundation for aquatic food webs as well as shelter for northern pike and yellow perch, both of which are native fish species. A 2017 ecological survey of the Yahara lakes conducted by the Dane County Land & Water Resources Department found 24 aquatic plant species, including the coontail, muskgrass, common waterweed, small duckweed, American lotus, variable pondweed, wild celery, and common bladderwort. These native plant species play a role in partially mitigating the increasing eutrophication of Lake Mendota, as they absorb phosphorus and produce dissolved oxygen, and they aid in preserving the physical structure of the lake via their root systems, which stabilize sediment and limit shoreline erosion. The draining and damming of the wetlands that once surrounded Lake Mendota caused extensive losses of fish spawning areas, though about 34 fish species are still common in the lake, including the northern pike, white bass, walleye, largemouth bass, smallmouth bass, and musky. Starting in 2006, the University of Wisconsin-Madison Lakeshore Nature Preserve began to catalogue the bird species found in and around Lake Mendota, and, so far, over 255 bird species, most of which regularly occur in southern Wisconsin, have been spotted during their annual migrations. Some of the bird species found in the Nature Preserve include the blue jay, American goldfinch, Baltimore oriole, bald eagle, great horned owl, marsh wren, and common loon.

However, in recent decades, Lake Mendota has become increasingly eutrophic, and the Wisconsin Department of Natural Resources has documented the presence of numerous invasive species of both plants and animals in the lake. Eutrophication has caused a rapid increase in the abundance of aquatic plants and in the frequency of harmful algal blooms, with the latter being attributable to cyanobacteria. The dominant genera of cyanobacteria in Lake Mendota include Aphanizomenon, Anabaena, and Microcystis, with yearly cyanobacterial blooms occurring in almost every Madison lake since 2017. There are various invasive species in Lake Mendota, including the curly-leaf pondweed, Eurasian water-milfoil, freshwater jellyfish, spiny water flea, water lettuce, and zebra mussel. The spiny water flea in particular has led to devastating ecological consequences in Lake Mendota, as it consumes the native zooplankton Daphnia pulicaria, which has led to marked decreases in water clarity due to increases in the population size of phytoplankton, which are the preferred prey of D. pulicaria.

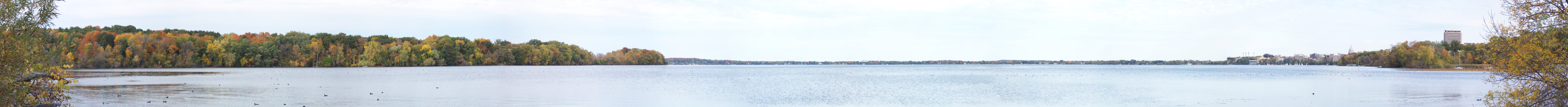
Lake Mendota as seen from the University Bay landing in the fall of 2008

== Artifacts ==
On November 2, 2021, a team from the Wisconsin Historical Society raised a dugout canoe to the surface of Lake Mendota. It was discovered by marine archeologist Tamara Thomsen and SCUBA assistant Mallory Dragt while joyriding on their scooters in June 2021. At 1200 years old, it was the oldest known sunken boat/shipwreck in Wisconsin at that time. On September 22, 2022, a team from the Wisconsin Historical Society raised a dugout canoe to the surface of Lake Mendota. As of 2025, sixteen canoes have been discovered, ranging from 700 to 5,200 years old.

== Gallery ==
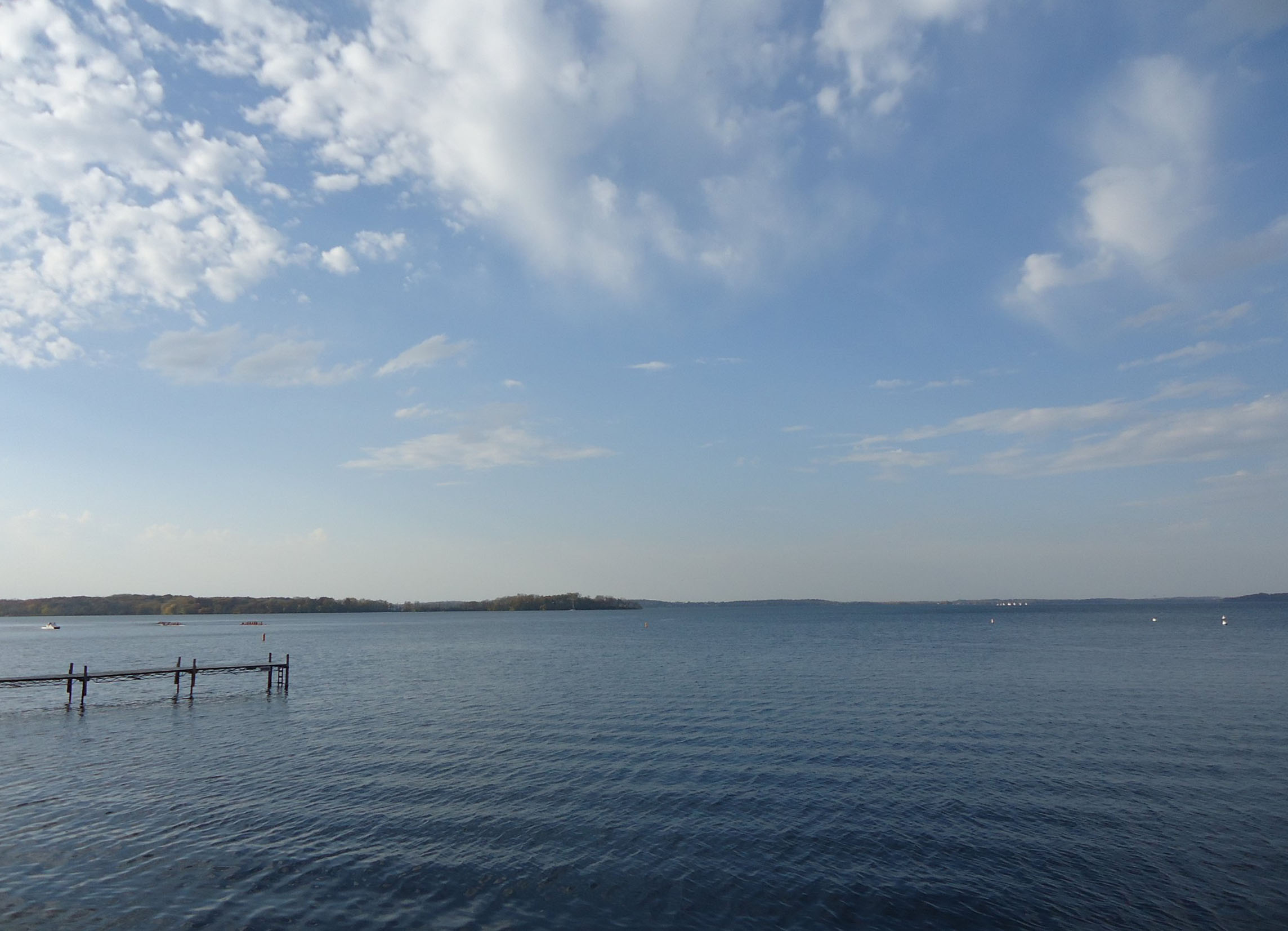
Lake Mendota viewed from the steps of the Memorial Union

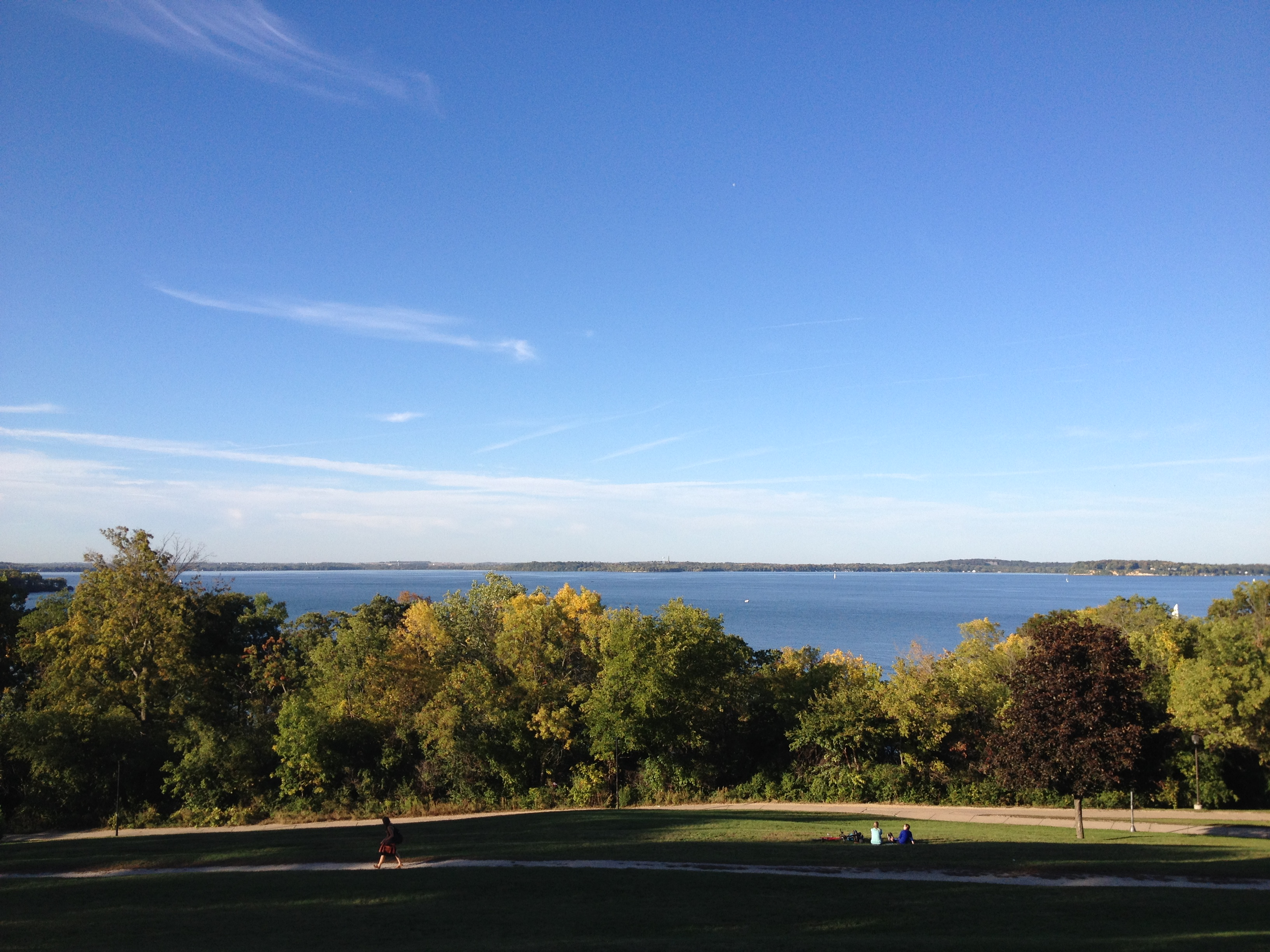
Lake Mendota viewed from the top of Observatory Drive

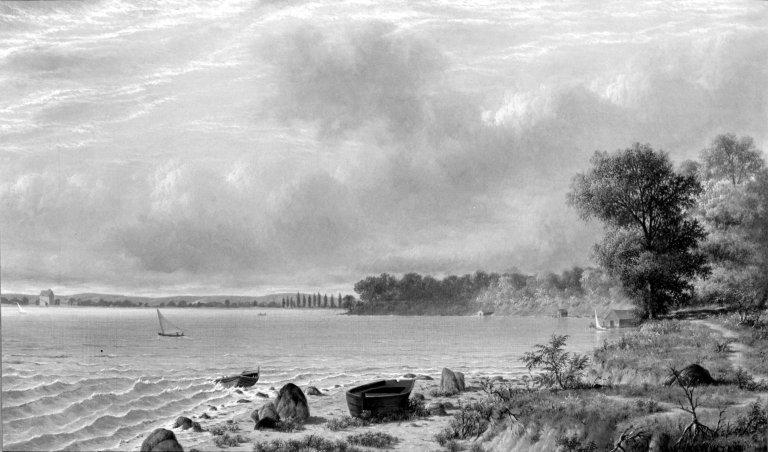
Lake Mendota by Joseph Rusling Meeker

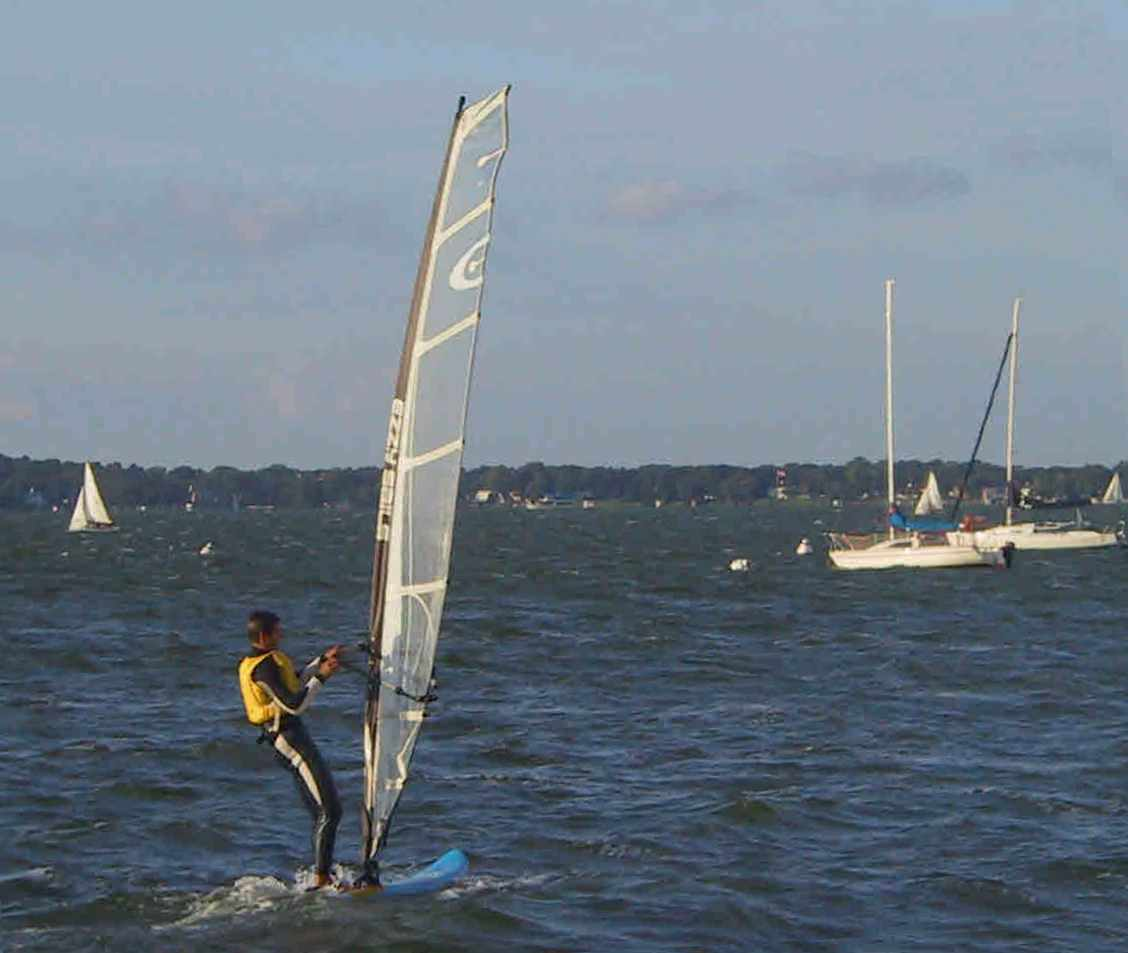
Windsurfer on the lake

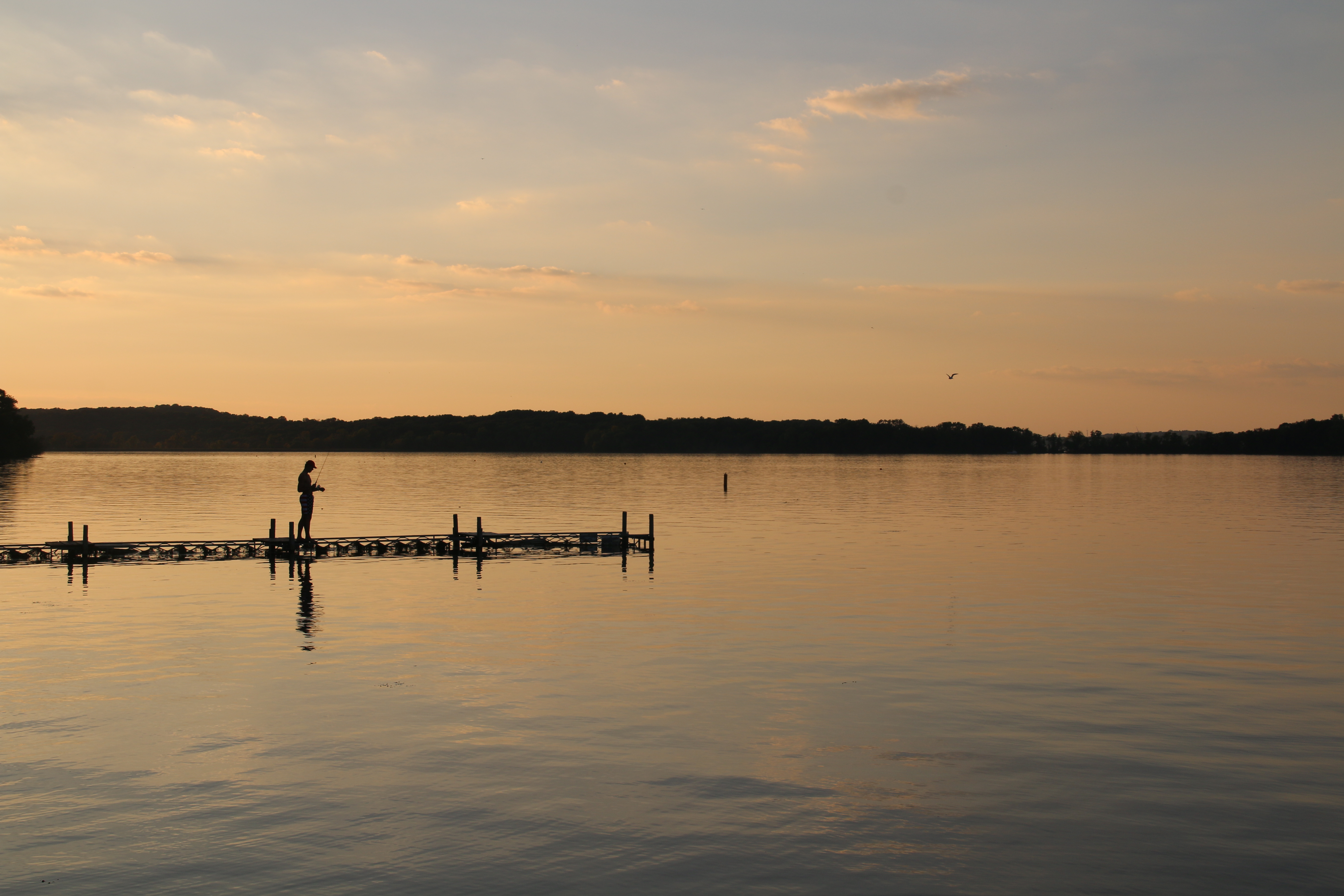
Lake Mendota at sunset

== See also ==
- Lake Kegonsa
- Lake Monona
- Lake Waubesa
- Lake Wingra
- Lake Mendota Boathouse
- List of lake monsters
- Flag of Madison, Wisconsin
