= Chancey Juday =

American biologist (1871–1944)

- Born: May 5, 1871; Millersburg, Indiana
- Died: March 29, 1944 (aged 72)
- Education: A.B., A.M. Indiana University (1896, 1897)
- Occupation: Limnologist
- Known for: Co-founder of the Limnological Society of America
- Awards: Leidy Award (1943)

Chancey Juday (May 5, 1871 – March 29, 1944) together with G. Evelyn Hutchinson, and his close collaborator, Edward A. Birge were pioneers of North American limnology. Birge and Juday founded an influential school of limnology on Lake Mendota at the University of Wisconsin. Edward Birge hired Chancey Juday through this program to help him take samples of lakes in Wisconsin. Their main sampling took place on Lake Mendota. The two, Juday and Birge, studied dissolved oxygen and temperature, leading future limnologists to a better understanding of stratification.

Juday, born 5 May 1871 at Millersburg, Indiana, completed his A.B. (1896) and A.M. (1897) degrees at Indiana University. Many years later he was also awarded an honorary LL.D.

Juday was one of the founders of the Limnological Society of America, serving as its president for two years. He was awarded the Leidy Award (1943) by the Philadelphia Academy of Natural Sciences. Juday died on March 29, 1944, but in 1950 shared posthumously the Einar Naumann Medal of the International Association of Limnology with Birge.

Dr. Juday published papers on the lakes of Indiana, Colorado, California, Central America, New York and other localities. Among his eminent contributions are those to the understanding of plankton migration, the significance of dissolved gases in lakes, chemistry of lake waters, growth of lake animalss, lake populations and the productivity of lakes.
