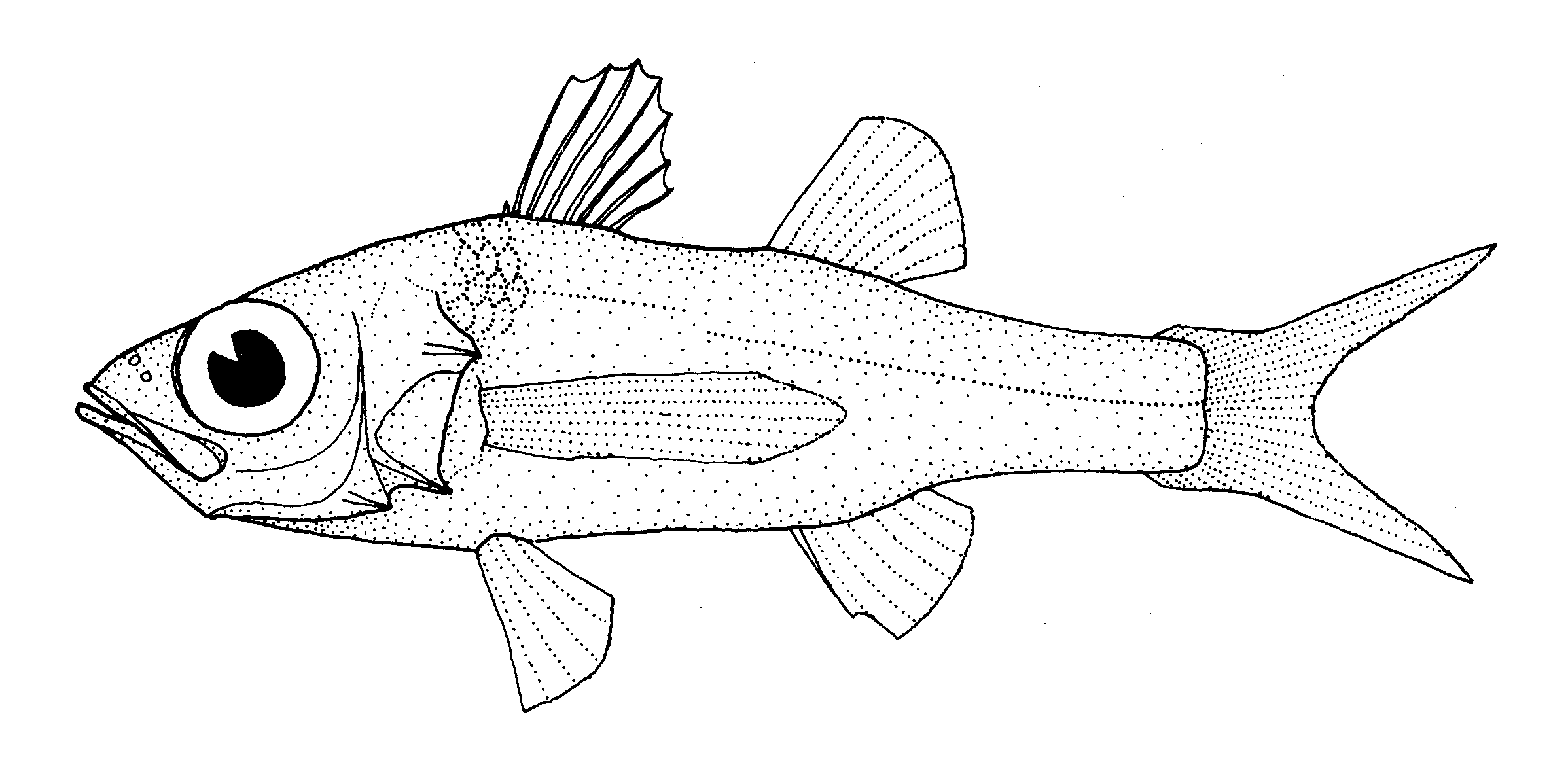
- Howella brodiei

Scientific classification
- Kingdom: Animalia
- Phylum: Chordata
- Class: Actinopterygii
- Order: Acropomatiformes
- Family: Howellidae; Ogilby, 1899

Genera
- See text

= Oceanic basslets =

Oceanic basslets Temporal range: Late Eocene-present

Family of ray-finned fishes

The oceanic basslets are ray-finned fish that belong to the small family Howellidae within the order Acropomatiformes. The family includes about 9 species. They are mostly deep-water species, some of which move to shallower waters at night. Various species are found in the Indian Ocean, Pacific Ocean, including the Coral Sea, and Atlantic Ocean, including the Caribbean Sea.

== Genera ==
The following three genera are classified as part of the Howellidae:

- Bathysphyraenops Parr, 1933
- Howella Ogilby, 1899
- Pseudohowella Fedoryako, 1976

The potential fossil genus Praegaleagra David, 1946 is known from isolated scales from the Late Eocene of California.
