= Lake 227 =

Lake in Ontario, Canada

Coordinates: 49°41′17″N 93°41′24″W

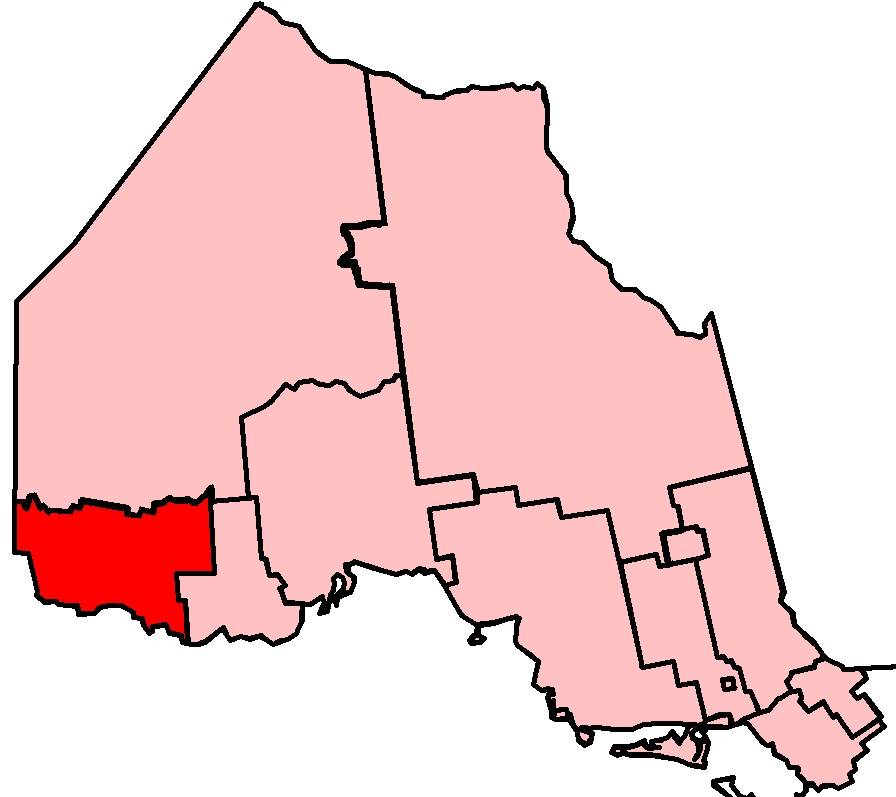
Location of Experimental Lakes Area in Ontario, Canada

Lake 227 is one of 58 lakes located in the Experimental Lakes Area (ELA) in the Kenora District of Ontario, Canada. Lake 227 is one of only five lakes in the Experimental Lakes Area currently involved in long-term research projects, and is of particular note for its importance in long-term lake eutrophication studies. The relative absence of human activity and pollution makes Lake 227 ideal for limnological research, and the nature of the ELA makes it one of the few places in the world accessible for full lake experiments. At its deepest, Lake 227 is 10 meters (33 ft) deep, and the area of the lake is approximately 5 hectares (12 acres). Funding and governmental permissions for access to Lake 227 have been unstable in recent years, as control of the ELA was handed off by the Canadian government to the International Institute for Sustainable Development (IISD).

== Ecology ==
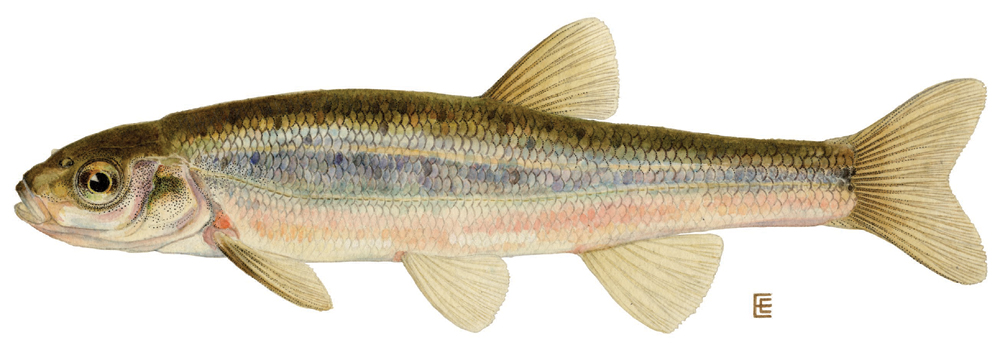
Pearl Dace

Lake 227 is a freshwater lake. The ELA region is home to a variety of native fish, many of which are planktivorous. Fathead minnows, fine-scale dace, and pearl dace are all examples of fish that can be found in the lake. The presence of planktivorous fish reduces the relative abundance of larger zooplankton species in the lake, as species like the fathead minnow primarily feed on them. The fish populations in Lake 227 were removed in the 1990s, which resulted in a noticeable increase in the Chaoborus and Daphnia populations, in the absence of predation. The removal of fish from the lake negates the top-down effect that repressed larger species of zooplankton and aquatic larvae.

== Research ==
The research in lake 227 is mainly focused on the effects of manipulated nutrients on the interrelated independent variables of microorganism activity and eutrophication. Lake 227 was home to the longest running experiment ever to take place in the ELA.

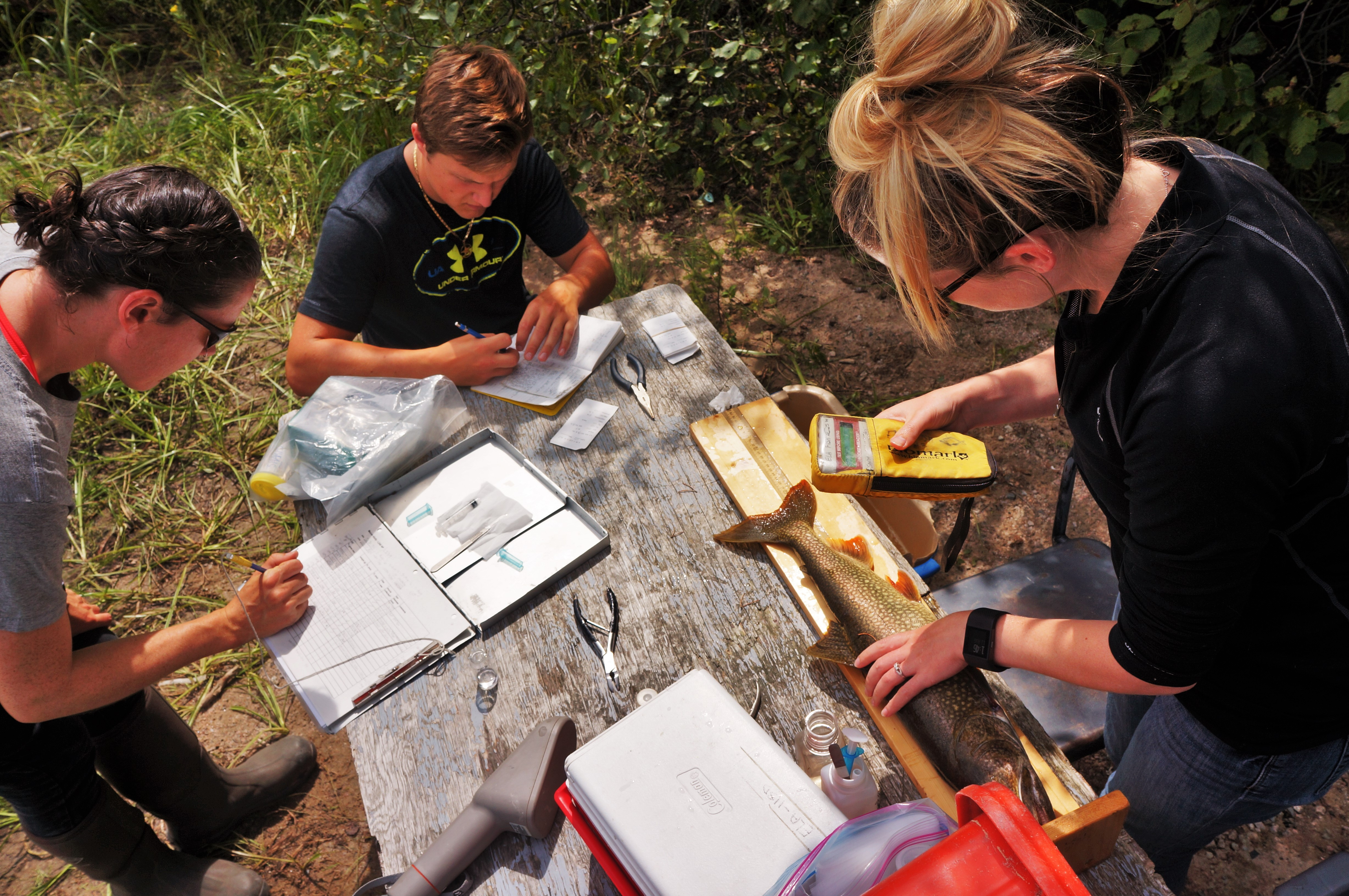
Active research in the Experimental lakes region (Lake 239)

=== Lake eutrophication and nutrient factors ===
Lake 227 has been used as a real life model for the study of the connection between nutrient input and lake eutrophication. The results of these experiments hold widespread implications for future limnological research in this area, and for the control of lake eutrophication.

In the culmination of an experiment spanning over 37 years in lake 227, American limnologist David W. Schindler suggested that the level of phosphorus is the dominant factor in controlling eutrophication, and the effect of nitrogen decrease/increase is insignificant on eutrophication. Carbon was not found to a significant eutrophication factor.

These conclusions have enormous implications in the area of preventing and reducing human-induced lake eutrophication, as researchers can use this information when designing and proposing experiments to investigate the still controversial topic of P limitation vs N and P limitation on-lake eutrophication. These conclusions suggest that efforts to reduce eutrophication should focus resources of phosphorus removal.

The exclusive P limitation suggested by Schindler's 37-year eutrophication experiment was challenged by limnologists Thad Scott and Mark McCarthy in their 2010 paper reanalyzing data from Schindler's experiment. Scott and McCarthy make a case for N:P colimitation of phytoplankton biomass and eutrophication. While Schindler did find an increase in nitrogen-fixing cyanobacteria as the N:P ratio was lowered, Scott and McCarthy argue that N concentration continued to decrease after the halt in N fertilization and that the increase in cyanobacteria does not offset the lack of fertilization effect, based on this, they suggest that Lake 227 is N-limited.

=== Organisms and nutrient factors ===
The decrease of nitrogen was found to have a positive effect on the abundance of nitrogen fixing bacteria. And although phosphorus is considered to be the most significant factor in eutrophication, nitrogen limitation was still a significant factor in the overall lake ecology. Fertilization with nitrogen and phosphorus was found to significantly increase the abundance of primary producers (phytoplankton). Additionally, as the N:P ratio was altered over a 37-year period, it was found that heterocyst abundance deviated significantly from historical values (see paleolimnology), likely due to the inherent advantage of nitrogen fixing organisms when the N:P ratio is low. A rapid increase in N- fixing cyanobacteria was seen after initial lowering of the N:P ratio.

=== Paleolimnology ===
In a study conducted by O'Connell et al. sediment samples taken from 227 were used to determine historical eutrophication levels. These historical levels can be compared to recent experimentally altered levels to provide increased historical control context for current data. Sediment cores taken from the lake bed revealed increased levels of phosphorus deposition correlated with the timeline nutrient manipulation experiments done in the lake over the past half century (see Lake eutrophication and nutrient factors above). The collection of the paleolimnological data in the lake makes Lake 227 even more ideal for the study of lake eutrophication. The eutrophication induced by today's scientists was found to be more significant than any other indicated by the analysis of the historical sediment samples.

Past abundances of zooplankton were also determined from the sediment deposits, and this data was used to speculate about the development of trophic levels in freshwater lakes in relation to planktivorous fish species.

== David Schindler ==
David W. Schindler (August 3, 1940 – March 4, 2021) was a leading member of the limnological community from the 1950s into the contemporary era, known particularly for his work in the Experimental Lakes Area. Schindler was involved with the majority of relevant studies in lake 227 to come out in the past several decades, including many of the papers discussed in the research section of this article. Along with 227, Schindler took part in research on many other lakes in the Experimental Lakes Area, and was the director of projects at the Experimental Lakes Area from 1968 to 1989. Look in the references of most any paper written the subject of freshwater ecology, and you will likely find Schindler's name. Schindler was a universally revered figure in the research and academic communities, and his contributions were key in shaping the field of limnology, and freshwater ecology at large.

== See also ==
- Lake 226
- Peter and Paul Lakes
