= Yvette Hardman Edmondson =

Journal editor-in-chief and aquatic scientist

- Born: Yvette Hardman; September 20, 1915; Manhattan, NY
- Died: May 6, 2006 (aged 90)
- Known for: editor, Limnology and Oceanography
- Spouse: Walles T. Edmondson
- Scientific career
- Thesis: The influence of solid surfaces upon lake bacteria (1940)

Yvette Hardman Edmondson (born Yvette Hardman) was the editor of Limnology and Oceanography the premier journal of the Association for the Sciences of Limnology and Oceanography (1968 to 1986) and was an aquatic scientist known for her research on bacteria in aquatic systems.

== Education and personal life ==
Edmondson graduated from the Walden School in New York City in 1932. She obtained her undergraduate degree in literature from Bennington College in 1936, as part of the first class to graduate from the college. In 1938, Edmondson obtained an M.S. in Bacteriology from the University of Minnesota, with a minor in Agricultural Biochemistry, with a thesis examining filamentous bacteria in lakes. Edmondson then moved to the University of Wisconsin Madison where she worked with Elizabeth McCoy and Perry Wilson. She completed a Ph.D. in Bacteriology in 1940 with a dissertation titled "The influence of solid surfaces upon lake bacteria", research that was later published in the scientific literature.

In the first term of her Ph.D. at the University of Wisconsin Madison, she met Walles T. Edmondson ('Tommy'), and she helped him collect rotifers for his research. They were married in New Haven on September 26, 1941, while Tommy was working at Yale University.

In 1990, a newsletter from the University of Wisconsin asked Edmondson about the lack of women in the sciences in the 1930s and 1940s; she responded:

The lack of women in the sciences was not visibly from my point of view. My advisor was a woman and there were three other female graduate students in bacteriology

— Yvette Hardman Edmondson

== Career ==
Following her Ph.D., Edmondson was a teaching fellow in science at Bennington College, and she remained there during World War II. In 1945 a Science news article described her leave of absence from Bennington to work at Woods Hole Oceanographic Institution on salt water ponds. There she first worked with her husband quantifying how the addition of nutrients altered the growth of phytoplankton, with the goal of estimating options for aquaculture; she focused on how oysters responded to higher levels of food that resulted from fertilization of the water. In 1937, Edmondson (then Yvette Hardman) was a visiting investigator at Woods Hole Oceanographic Institution, where she worked with Selman Waksman and others on marine microbiology. During the same period, Kenneth Thimann, Edmondson, and Babette Radner published their work on the production of anthocyanins by cultures of Spirodela. In 1949, Edmondson and her husband moved to Seattle when he took a position at the University of Washington.

Edmondson worked with the ecologist G. Evelyn Hutchinson and co-authored the final volume of Hutchinson's Treatise on Limnology, which was published in 1993. In 1971, Edmondson dedicated a special issue of Limnology and Oceanography to the life and accomplishments of G. Evelyn Hutchinson. Edmondson also memorialized Hutchinson in Limnology and Oceanography after his death in 1991.

From 1968 (volume 13) until 1986 (volume 31), Edmondson was the editor of Limnology & Oceanography, the journal of the Association for the Sciences of Limnology and Oceanography. As editor, Edmondson published details about the scope of the journal, the types of manuscripts acceptable for publication, the role of reviewers, which may go unnoticed by a manuscript's authors, and each step in the review process at the journal. Some authors, such as the microbiologist Richard Morita, were disappointed to learn that their manuscripts did not meet the criteria for the journal. In the obituary Robert Paine wrote for the Limnology and Oceanography Bulletin after her death in 2006, he emphasized her contributions to the evolution of the journal, a portion of which she had described in her final issue as editor.

== Honors ==
- Association for the Sciences of Limnology and Oceanographys Distinguished Service Award renamed the Tommy and Yvette Edmondson Distinguished Service Award (2009)
- University of Washington award: W.T. and Yvette H. Edmondson Graduate Student Award for graduate student research in biological limnology
- Distinguished Service Award, American Society of Limnology and Oceanography (1999)
- Alumni award, Bennington College (1979)
