= Walles T. Edmondson =

American limnologist

Walles Thomas Edmondson (April 24, 1916 – January 10, 2000), also known as "Tommy" amongst his peers, was a prominent professor of zoology at the University of Washington. Edmondson was also leading American limnoecologist and writer, whose research focused on the causation and effects of eutrophication by plankton and his early work on rotifer taxonomy from Hispaniola, the Himalayas and lakes across the United States.

Edmondson won the Eminent Ecologist Award in 1983 from the Ecological Society of America.

== Personal life ==
Edmondson was born and raised in Milwaukee, Wisconsin, where he would spend much of his youth at Lake Michigan learning about its biology. By 1938, Edmonson completed his B.Sc. from Yale University with eight scientific paper publications, one of which was in the journal Science. Edmondson was known for his unconventional thought process and used many disciplines for his research, much of which included: systematics, fixation methods, and substrate effects. While at Yale, Edmondson did his Ph.D. with G. Evelyn Hutchinson and he also studied at the University of Wisconsin and Trout Lake under Chancey Juday.

At Wisconsin, Edmondson would meet Yvette Hardman, who would later become a close colleague and later on become his wife. The two got married in 1941 in Dwight Chapel, New Haven. This was hours after Edmondson completed his preliminary exams for his Ph.D. Edmondson became an oceanographer for the US Navy to aid with the war effort. In 1949, Edmondson and Hardman moved to Washington, where Edmondson would become a professor and teach limnology. In the 1950s, while in Seattle, Edmondson convinced the public they could implement solution to help clean Lake Washington leading to a large infusion of funds by the city of Seattle that was used to restore the lake. On his birthday in 1973 Edmondson was elected to the National Academy of Sciences. In 1980, the Societas Internationalis Limnologiae honored Edmondson with their highest honor, the Naumann-Thienemann Medal. His nomination as an eminent ecologist to the Ecological Society of America was written by G. Evelyn Hutchinson in 1984. In 2009, the Association for the Sciences of Limnology and Oceanography (ASLO) honored Edmondson by renaming an award for distinguished service to the Tommy and Yvette Edmondson Distinguished Service Award which recognizes "members who have displayed exceptional efforts that support the professional goals and enhance the stature of ASLO."

== Awards ==
- Member, National Academy of Sciences (1973)
- National Academy of Sciences Award for Environmental Quality (1973)
- Naumann-Thienemann Medal, International Society for Theoretical and Applied Limnology (1980)
- Eminent Ecologist Award, Ecological Society of America (1983)
