= Experimental Lakes Area =

Freshwater research area in Ontario, Canada

Coordinates: 49.7833°N 93.8158°W

- Founders: W. E. Johnson; John Vallentyne
- Established: 1968
- Faculty: David W. Schindler (1968-1989)
- Budget: Approx $4.5m
- Location: Kenora District, Ontario, Canada
- Website: IISD Experimental Lakes Area

IISD-ELA's position in Kenora District, Ontario, Canada.

IISD Experimental Lakes Area (IISD-ELA, known as ELA before 2014) is an internationally unique research station encompassing 58 formerly pristine freshwater lakes in Kenora District, Ontario, Canada. In response to the International Joint Commission (IJC)'s 1965 recommendations related to transboundary pollution, the federal and provincial governments set aside these lakes to study water pollution. During the 1970s and 1980s, David Schindler, who was at that time 'Canada's leading ecologist', conducted a series of innovative, landmark large-scale experiments in ELA on eutrophication that led to the banning of phosphates in detergents. In an unexpected and controversial move that was widely condemned by the scientific community, in 2012 the ELA was de-funded by the Canadian Federal Government. The facility is now managed and operated by the International Institute for Sustainable Development (IISD) and has a mandate to investigate the aquatic effects of a wide variety of stresses on lakes and their catchments. IISD-ELA used the whole ecosystem approach and makes long-term, whole-lake investigations of freshwater focusing on eutrophication.

In an article published in AAAS's scientific journal Science, Eric Stokstad described ELA's "extreme science" as the manipulation of whole lake ecosystem with ELA researchers collecting long-term records for climatology, hydrology, and limnology that address key issues in water management. The site has influenced public policy in water management in Canada, the US, and around the world.

Minister of State for Science and Technology, Gary Goodyear, argued that "our government has been working hard to ensure that the Experimental Lakes Area facility is transferred to a non-governmental operator better suited to conducting the type of world-class research that can be undertaken at this facility" and that "[t]he federal government has been leading negotiations in order to secure an operator with an international track record." On April 1, 2014, the International Institute for Sustainable Development announced that it had signed three agreements to ensure that it will be the long-term operator of the research facility and that the facility would henceforth be called IISD Experimental Lakes Area. Since taking over the facility, IISD has expanded the function of the site to include educational and outreach opportunities and a broader research portfolio.

== History ==
In 1968, the Province of Ontario and the Government of Canada set aside an area in a sparsely inhabited region of central Canada, southeast of Kenora, Ontario, which is relatively unaffected by external human influences and industrial activities, for experimental studies of the causes and control of eutrophication and other types of water pollution. It included 46 small, deep, pristine lakes and their catchment areas in the Precambrian Shield.

The ELA project originated as a Canadian governmental response to the International Joint Commission (IJC)'s recommendation (1965) to Canada and the United States for additional support for studies on transboundary pollution in the lower Great Lakes.

In the 1960s, there was a widespread concern about the consequences of eutrophication but there was a lack of solid scientific evidence. Dr. W. E. Johnson of the Freshwater Institute of Winnipeg convinced the Canadian government that unimpeachable evidence could be obtained by experimental pollution of pristine lakes through controlled overfertilization of specified elements. The Experimental Lakes Area was established in 1968 by the Fisheries Research Board of Canada. Dr. John Reubec Vallentyne and Dr. W. E. Johnson of the Freshwater Institute created the Experimental Lakes Area (ELA). While Vallentyne was Scientific Leader of the Eutrophication Section from 1966 to 1972, he attracted a stellar staff of scientists from around the world in the late 1960s and early 1970s. He recruited a junior scientist, David W. Schindler. Schindler, who would become one of the world's leading limnologists, would direct ELA projects from 1968 to 1989.

ELA was earlier co-sponsored by the Canadian Departments of Environment and Fisheries and Oceans, with a mandate to investigate the aquatic effects of a wide variety of stresses on lakes and their catchments and is now managed by the International Institute for Sustainable Development.

Since the formation of Eagle-Dogtooth Provincial Park in 2003, a portion of the Experimental Lakes Area is part of this park. In particular Lakes # 109, 421, 625, and 938 are fully within the park, while Lakes # 110, 262, 309, and 428 have only portions or shorelines within the park.

== Contributions to hydrology ==
In 1969, the fertilization experiment began with Lake 227, and in 1973, the double-basin eutrophication experiment on Lake 226 began, in which a section of the Lake 226S was overfertilized with carbon and nitrogen and the other section 226N with carbon and nitrogen as well as phosphorus. The iconic image of the green eutrophied section 226N has been described as the most important in the history of limnology. It convinced the public and policy-makers that phosphorus levels needed to be controlled.

"Work at the ELA has produced important evidence on the effects of acid rain and led to the discovery that phosphates from household detergents cause algal blooms. It has elucidated the impacts on fish of mercury and shown how wetland flooding for hydroelectricity leads to increased production of greenhouse gases."

In the years leading up to the 2001 Gerhard Herzberg Gold Medal for Science and Engineering award, Schindler's research "demonstrated the cumulative impacts on boreal lake life of global warming, acidification and ozone depletion. Using long-term reference data collected at the ELA, he has shown that climate warming and drought have severe and previously unrecognized effects on the physics, chemistry, and biology of lakes."

=== Literary works and achievements ===
ELA has produced 745 peer-reviewed scientific articles, 126 graduate theses, 102 book chapters and synthesis papers, 185 data reports, and several books. ELA scientists have been the recipients of numerous prestigious international water awards, including the Stockholm Water Prize, the Tyler Prize for Environmental Achievement and the Gerhard Herzberg Gold Medal for Science and Engineering.

According to John Shearer, who worked at the ELA as Senior Biologist and Operations Manager, from 1969 until his retirement in 2007, 47 PhD candidates completed dissertations and 80 master's students completed theses, using research they participated in at the ELA.

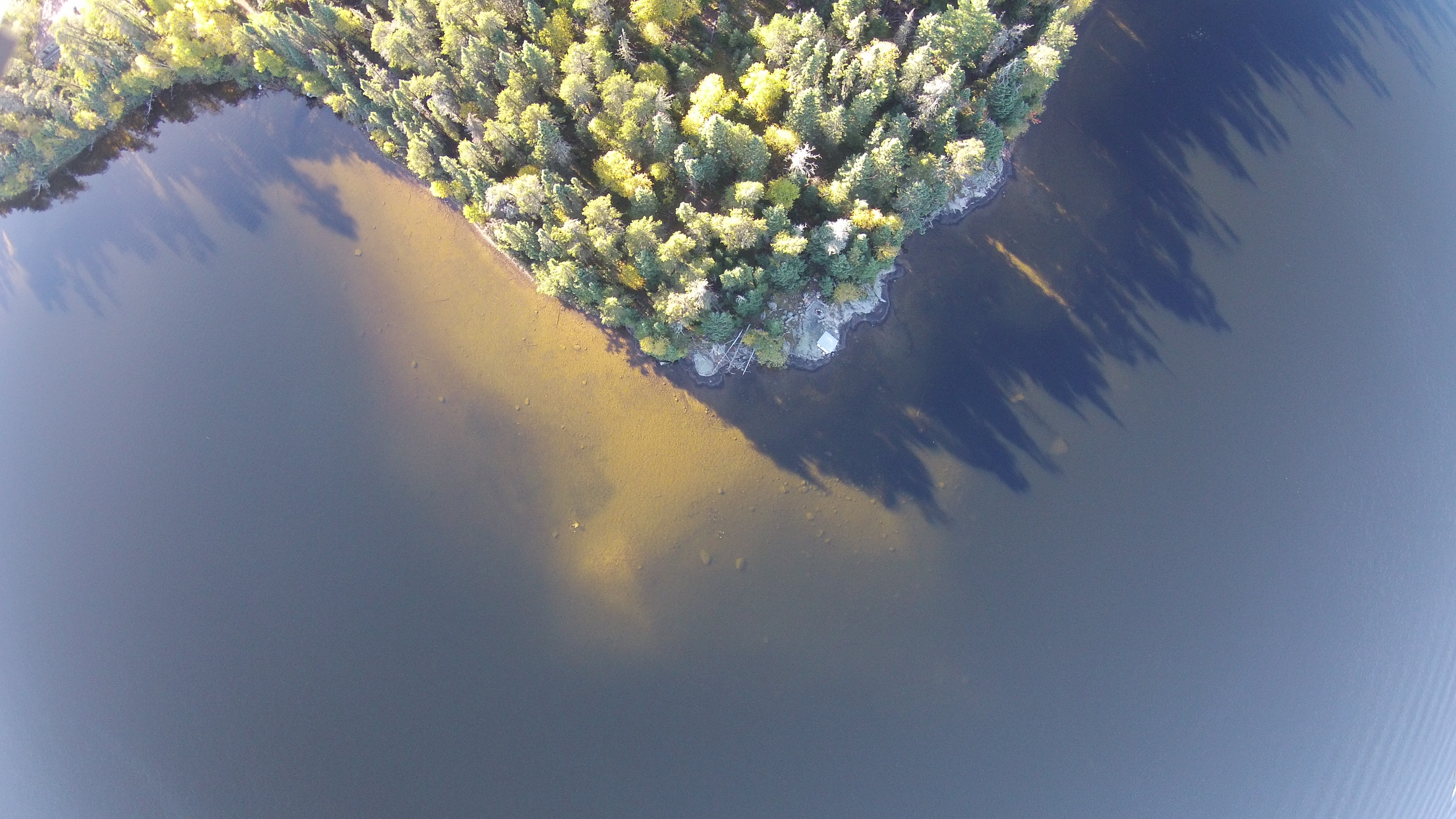
Lake 239 at IISD Experimental Lakes Area from above

Hundreds of peer-reviewed articles have been based on ELA research in journals such as Environmental Toxicology and Chemistry, Canadian Journal of Earth Sciences, Atmospheric Chemistry and Physics (ACP), Transactions of the American Fisheries Society, Hydrological Processes, Limnology and Oceanography, Environmental Science and Technology, including at least 184 in the Canadian Journal of Fisheries and Aquatic Sciences and 30 in Biogeochemistry.

== Controversy about defunding ==
=== Bill C-38 Jobs, Growth and Long-term Prosperity Act cutbacks to science ===
The omnibus Bill C-38 Jobs, Growth and Long-term Prosperity Act which passed as a 2012 Budget Implementation Act in June 2012 amended the Fisheries Act and closed the Experimental Lakes Area. Bill C-38 was given Royal Assent on June 29, 2012.

=== Fisheries Act ===
In 2012, the Department of Fisheries and Oceans announced that it planned to discontinue supporting the site at the end of the financial year, March 31, 2013, at a cost of $50 million. The site would be either decommissioned or handed to a third-party operator.

Senator Jim Cowan at the 1st Session, 41st Parliament (June 21, 2012) expressed his concerns. "There are a number of proposed changes to the Fisheries Act that are causing deep concern among Canadians. The bill amends the act to limit fish protection to the support of "commercial, recreational and Aboriginal fisheries." Protection of fish habitat is relegated to a vastly lower priority — something that caused those four former fisheries ministers, in their words, "especial alarm." Cowan also expressed dismay at the closure of Experimental Lakes Area.

Bill C-38 eliminates $2 million in annual funding to the Experimental Lakes Area in northwestern Ontario. This research centre will close within a year if a new operator cannot be found. John Smol, a biologist at Queen’s University, has said that the Experimental Lakes Area is the best-known freshwater research facility on the planet. The planned closure of the centre was the subject of an article on May 21 in Nature magazine.

— Senator Cowan 2012

According to Elizabeth May,

Fish habitat provisions will be changed to protect only fish of "commercial, Aboriginal, and recreational" value and even those habitat protections are weakened. The new provisions create an incentive to drain a lake and kill all the fish, if not in a fishery, in order to fill a dry hole with mining tailings.

— Elizabeth May 2012

=== DFO dismantling ELA cabins ===
In March 2013, with no advance notification to scientists whose personal belongings remained at the site or to the IISD, the Department of Fisheries and Oceans began dismantling cabins that had been used by the Experimental Lakes Project scientists. Scientist Roberto Quinlan of the Society of Canadian Limnologists said that this move "brings into serious doubt the government’s sincerity to actually transfer the facility over to another operator."

=== Defunding widely condemned by scientific community ===
The decision to abruptly defund the ELA was widely condemned by the Canadian and international scientific community. The scientific journal Nature in 2012, described the decision as "disturbing", and said that it "is hard to believe that finance is the true reason" for the closure. An open letter from five prominent scientific organizations, the Association for the Sciences of Limnology and Oceanography, the Ecological Society of America, the International Society of Limnology, the Society of Canadian Limnologists, and the Society for Freshwater Sciences, expressed concern over the impact that a closure would have "on the strong and creative science that has been, and continues to be, conducted by Canadian freshwater researchers." An organization of Canadian citizens and scientists spearheaded by Diane Orihel, the Coalition to Save ELA has been formed to pressure the Canadian government to reverse the decision to close the Experimental Lakes Area.

The planned closure of the centre was the subject of an article 21 May 2012 in Nature journal.

On 25 May 2012 The North American Lake Management Society (NALMS), representing nearly 1,000 members — researchers, scientists, administrators, and citizens — wrote a letter of concern regarding the imminent closure of ELA, arguing that NALMS' work "depends on findings from the ELA." NALMS asked the federal government to reconsider. "The Experimental Lakes Area (ELA) is a rare resource not only in Canada but throughout the world, as a dedicated research facility for ecosystem-scale experimental investigations and long-term monitoring of ecosystem processes. Operating for more than 40 years, it continues to study physical, chemical and biological processes and interactions operating on an ecosystem spatial scale and a multi-year time frame. These have led to extremely important discoveries. As an example, the world’s fertilizer industry now recognizes the importance of phosphorus in lakes and reservoirs, 40 years after its importance was demonstrated at ELA. Regulatory actions have been supported by ELA research, and now there is action by the industry as a result of research and activities at ELA over several decades. The experience gained at ELA by many scientists has resulted in the dissemination of environmental expertise and problem solving throughout the world, improving human conditions, protecting the environment, and saving millions of dollars for citizens and government agencies. Furthermore, we consider the work now in progress at ELA very important to the future of lake and reservoir management."

=== Response from opposition parties and Senators ===
Many Canadian MPs called on the Harper Government to reverse its decision on the forced closure of the Experimental Lakes Project. NDP MP Philip Toone argued that the "internationally recognized program with huge spin-offs for Canada will cost more to close and move than the $2 million that the government hopes to save."

=== International Institute for Sustainable Development ===
The federal government led negotiations with the Ontario government, the Manitoba government and the International Institute for Sustainable Development (IISD), headquartered in Winnipeg, to keep the area operational in 2013 and ensure longer-term operations. IISD is funded by the UN, governments including the Canadian government, international organizations and philanthropic foundations. It also gets money from universities and private-sector companies including TransCanada Energy, Enbridge and Manitoba Hydro. On April 1, 2014, IISD announced that three agreements have been signed involving IISD, the Government of Ontario and the Government of Canada that together ensure the long-term operation of the Experimental Lakes Area (ELA) research facility.

Ontario Premier Kathleen Wynne has committed support to keep the ELA "operating in the long term after the federal Conservative government walks away from the world-class freshwater research station at the end of August 2013."

Dr. John Rudd, former DFO Research Scientist (1977-2002), ELA Chief Scientist (1998-2002), and winner of DFO's most prestigious award, the Deputy Minister's Prix d’Excellence (2002) argued that "IISD is not qualified on a scientific basis to run ELA... ELA is a unique facility and its scientific research needs to be directed by scientists who know how to do these experiments, but unfortunately, almost all present and recently retired scientists have been cut out of the transfer process."

Elizabeth May, who served on the board of the International Institute for Sustainable Development for nine years prior to entering politics, argues that the "IISD, a think tank, is not necessarily the right organization to take on this mandate. However, keeping the ELA open and functioning, and in a public and transparent context, was paramount."

== IISD-ELA today ==
Since IISD took over the site in 2014, it has been called IISD Experimental Lakes Area (IISD-ELA). IISD-ELA has continued to carry out its whole-lake experimentation, but has also expanded its research portfolio to include research on nanosilver, microplastics, climate change and more. It also places a greater emphasis on educational and outreach opportunities and on garnering media coverage for its work.

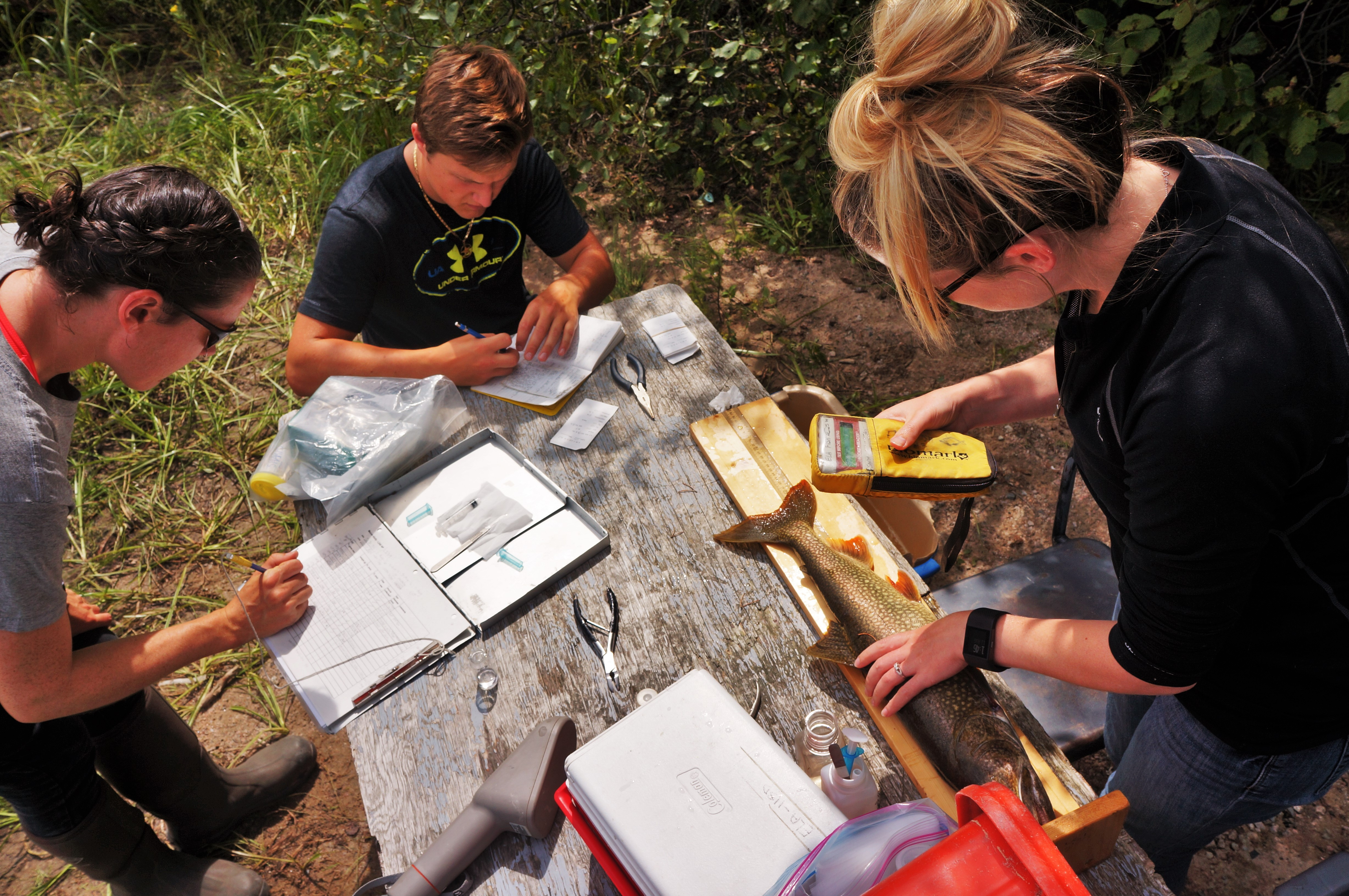
IISD Experimental Lakes Area on the banks of Lake 239 in 2016

=== Nanosilver ===
In 2014, nanosilver (AgNP) particles were added to Lake 222 in order to determine the impacts of increasing nanosilver pollution on freshwater ecosystems. Over the course of a two-year study period, phytoplankton communities in boreal lakes were found to be unaffected by environmentally relevant nanosilver additions. However, both yellow perch and northern pike species were found to contain nanosilver within their tissues, particularly within the liver. The result of this bioaccumulation may pose a threat to aquatic food chains. At the individual level, yellow perch metabolic and consumption rates declined and remained depressed for one year.

=== Oil spills ===
Information surrounding the ecological impacts of oil spills on freshwater environments remains relatively unknown. In 2017, IISD-ELA launched a three-part study to determine the impacts of diluted bitumen on boreal freshwater systems and shoreline clean-up methods. Results published in 2020 have thus far indicated that most phytoplankton and zooplankton species exhibit an acute sensitivity to oil spills, as communities decreased by >70% in overall abundance.

=== Anti-depressants ===
Biochemically active forms of ingredients prescribed within common anti-depressants have been known to re-enter freshwater systems, however, little is known on their impact on aquatic ecosystems. In 2021, venlafaxine was introduced into boreal lake enclosures at levels previously detected in water bodies. The study will aim to reveal the potential effects of dose toxicity, modification of behavioural characteristics, and bioaccumulation within freshwater organisms and other effects to ecosystem services. Results are yet to be determined.

== See also ==
- Lake 226
- Lake 227
