= Peter and Paul Lakes =

Lake in Michigan

Gogebic County (MI) where Peter and Paul Lakes are found

Paul and Peter are two connected lakes located in Michigan's upper peninsula near the Wisconsin border in Vilas County (WI) and Gogebic County (MI). Paul and Peter are kettle lakes, which is a type of lake formed by glaciers. Peter Lake is larger with an area of 6.24 acres and a maximum depth of 19.6 meters while Paul Lake has an area of 4.12 acres and a maximum depth of 15 meters. The lakes are a part of the University of Notre Dame Environmental Research Center (UNDERC). The lakes, bogs, streams, and marshes of the UNDERC are located within deciduous and coniferous forests. The surrounding forest is made up mostly of sugar maple, yellow birch, and balsam fir. The two lakes are ideal for performing whole lake experiments since one lake can receive treatments while the other can remain a control. No fishing is allowed making the two connected lakes ideal for studying their fish populations. The lakes' basins are also located within the UNDERC meaning that no outside interference can occur. The lakes are dimictic, freezing in November and mixing in the fall and again partially mixing in the spring.

== Wildlife ==
Paul and Peter lakes are part of a complex wetland and forest ecosystem. Animal diversity is high in the surrounding area. The lakes and wetlands are home to amphibians such as green frogs and red-backed salamanders as well as reptiles such as common snapping turtles. White tailed deer, beavers, and bobcats inhabit the surrounding forest. A variety birds including ospreys, hawks, and bald eagles can also be found in the area. Mosses are common given the area's wet conditions. The lakes' most important native fish species are largemouth bass. Trout were added to the lakes as a part of an experiment examining the effects of hydrated lime. These trout would later die off and be replaced by the native largemouth bass.

== Aquatic Ecology ==
=== Ecosystem Collapses ===
Paul and Peter lakes have been used in multiple significant ecological studies due to their ideal experimental conditions. One such experiment found that ecosystem collapses can be predicted by monitoring a lake's physical, biological, and chemical properties. The researchers introduced large carnivorous fish to Peter lake, Paul was used as a control, to disrupt the ecosystem. The addition of these large fish resulted in decreasing populations of small fish. This in turn caused Daphnia populations to increase and phytoplankton to become less abundant. Collapses and significant shifts can be difficult to fix, so being able to predict when these changes are going to occur is crucial to preserving threatened ecosystems. However, the resources required to sufficiently monitor ecosystems are extensive and might not always be available.

=== Trophic Cascades ===
Paul and Peter were also used in an experiment examining trophic cascades in lake ecosystems. The researcher's hypothesized that "primary producers would respond more strongly to nutrient enrichment in lakes with three trophic levels than in lakes with a fourth trophic level." Paul and Peter lakes both have food webs with the most influential species being minnows. Golden shiners, fathead minnow, and other small fish that feed on zooplankton were added to Peter Lake. Largemouth bass, which had been removed prior to the experiment were then added. These bass died during the winter. Fertilizer was then added to Peter Lake. The results of Peter Lake were then compared to West Long Lake (another lake in the UNDERC) which was dominated by larger fish. This study demonstrated that lakes with piscivorous fish have lower amounts of chlorophyll and primary production than in lakes dominated by planktivorous fish. The study also found an "inverse relationship of planktivore biomass to biomass of Daphnia and an inverse relationship of crustacean mean size to chlorophyll and primary production."

=== Carbon ===
One study found that carbon from the surrounding terrestrial ecosystem (largely from leaves entering the lakes) makes up significant portion of the carbon in the Peter and Paul (40-55% of particulate carbon and 22-50% of zooplankton were found to be terrestrial in origin). The carbon from the surrounding forest supplements the carbon produced by aquatic plants allowing for larger zooplankton and fish populations. Given the results of the study, the researchers concluded that "fish are made from algae, but fish are also partly made from maple leaves."

A 2006 study tested the bacterial response to added ^{13}C in Peter lake while keeping primary production low in Paul lake. Peter Lake was fertilized to increase primary production. This allowed the researchers to determine the extent to which bacteria utilized carbon from primary production. The study found that bacteria use both autochthonous (from primary production of lake) and allochthonous (from terrestrial watershed) carbon. However, the bacteria did seem to use autochthonous carbon more than allochthonous carbon.

Another study examining the source of dissolved organic carbon (DOC) was performed on Peter and Paul lakes in 2007. Peter Lake received added nutrients to increase primary production and both lakes received inorganic ^{13}C; the origin of DOC was examined before and after the nutrient addition in Peter Lake. The color of the lakes was used to help analyze the results as the DOC of terrestrial origin is much more colored than DOC originating from primary production. Both sources of carbon can be very important in lakes. A clear trend was observed when comparing color/gross primary production to the percent of DOC coming from the lake's primary production.

=== Hydrated lime and rainbow trout ===
In a twenty seven year experiment beginning in 1951, researchers removed the native fish and added rainbow trout to the lakes. Hydrated lime, which precipitates organic substances, was added to Peter lake. This increased the euphotic zone depth from 2.7 to 4.3 meters. More hydrated lime was later added and further increased euphotic zone depth to 7 meters. The lakes' sediment was then examined to look at zooplankton remains. The researchers found that rainbow trout fed on the mostly Daphnia zooplankton content. The type of Daphnia dominant in Peter shifted to a smaller species after the addition of hydrated lime. Even though Paul Lake received the same change in dominant fish species as Peter Lake, no shift in zooplankton species occurred. The reason for the shift in Peter Lake occurred because of increased transparency, oxygen, and euphotic zone depth from the addition of hydrated lime. These changes made it easier for the rainbow trout to see and catch Daphnia.

=== Thermal Stratification and Lake Metabolism ===
Another study examined changes in the thermal structures of Peter and Paul Lakes. Dissolved oxygen was measured in various intervals to test how effectively they estimated the mixed layer depth. When dissolved oxygen was measured only once a day the time the measurements were taken could throw off the mixed layer depth. For example, measurements taken in the morning would estimate a deeper mixed layer depth, while measurements taken in the afternoon at higher temperatures would estimate shallower mixed layer depths. This can also cause the calculations of respiration and primary production to be inaccurate since mixed layer depth is used in these calculations.

=== Largemouth Bass Diets ===
During the winter of 1980–1981, nearly half of the largemouth bass in Peter and Paul Lakes died off. A study was conducted to determine if the diets of bass remained the same or if they changed to more optimally obtain nutrients that were more available without competition. The study found that the bass consumed less Daphnia following 1981. The Daphnia were replaced by more “highly ranked prey."

== See also ==
- Experimental Lakes Area
- Lake 226
- Lake 227
