= C. Susan Weiler =

Aquatic scientist

- Education: University of California at San Diego, Scripps Institution of Oceanography
- Scientific career
- Workplaces: Whitman College
- Thesis: Phased cell division in the dinoflagellate genus Ceratium : temporal pattern, use in determining growth rates, and ecological implications (1978)

C. Susan Weiler is an aquatic scientist known for developing mentoring programs for scientists as they navigate the transition from student to independent researcher.

== Education and career ==
Weiler obtained a B.A. in Biology from the University of California San Diego (1972) and a Ph.D. from Scripps Institution of Oceanography (1978). Following her Ph.D., Weiler did postdoctoral work at the University of British Columbia and the University of Oslo in Norway (as a NATO postdoctoral fellow) before moving to Whitman College in 1981. Weiler has served at the National Science Foundation in multiple roles and was the Executive Director of the American Society of Limnology and Oceanography (now the Association for the Sciences of Limnology and Oceanography, ASLO) from 1990 to 1999. During her time as Executive Director, Weiler also served as editor-in-chief for the ASLO Bulletin (1991–1999), now the Limnology and Oceanography Bulletin.

Weiler was a member of a panel convened by the United Nations Environment Program, and in 1991, Weiler discussed a report from the group about the impact of ozone depletion on marine phytoplankton in a Senate hearing held by Al Gore. While at the National Science Foundation, Weiler reported on meetings regarding research on ultraviolet radiation, and research Antarctica co-edited a book with Polly A. Penhale on the topic.

Weiler also had written an article Personality Type Differences Between Ph.D. Climate Researchers and the General Public: Implications for Effective Communication with Jason K. Keller and Christina Olex. The article advocates that climate scientists should adapt their communication style to better match how the public understands information in order for the information to be more accessible and effective.

In 1994, Weiler started the Dissertation Initiative for the Advancement of Limnology and Oceanography Symposium (DIALOG). Through collaboration with Ronald B. Mitchell (University of Oregon), This was followed by a program to bridge the gap between the natural and social sciences -- the Dissertations Initiative for the Advancement of Climate Change Research (DISCCRS) in 2003. These initiatives allowed recently-minted Ph.D. graduates to meet and expand interdisciplinary connections and provided mentoring and guidance for new scientists. Weiler and colleagues have examined the concerns of early career scientists about conducting interdisciplinary science, how to motivate new researchers to conduct climate change research, potential barriers to effective communication of research by scientists, and issues facing dual career couples. In 2009, Weiler described interdisciplinary training programs available from the National Science Foundation.

In 2007, Weiler received the Tommy and Yvette Edmondson Distinguished Service Award from the Association for the Sciences of Limnology and Oceanography for

outstanding leadership in the professional development and mentoring of the next generation of aquatic scientists

Weiler is a member of Sigma Xi, the scientific research honor society, where she has served roles in the national society and is currently president of her local Whitman College chapter.

== Research ==
Whitman's Ph.D. research was on the dinoflagellate Ceratium where she examined cell division in oligotrophic seawater and laboratory cultures. Weiler also found support for the control of cellular metabolism by adenine nucleotides by quantifying adenylate charge in Ceratium.

== Awards ==
- Sigma Xi (1976)
- Ramón Margalef Award for Excellence in Education, Association for the Sciences of Limnology and Oceanography (2010)
- Tommy and Yvette Edmondson Distinguished Service Award, Association for the Sciences of Limnology and Oceanography (2007)
