= Raelyn Cole =

American female editor and outdoorswoman

Raelyn Cole (née Annon; September 6, 1935 - December 17, 2015) was an American editor, mountaineer, and outdoorswoman. She served as the long-time managing editor for the journal Limnology and Oceanography for the Association for the Sciences of Limnology and Oceanography.

== Early life and education ==
Raelyn Annon was born in Wisconsin to parents Walter and Gladys Annon on September 6, 1935.

She met her husband, Dale Cole, at the University of Wisconsin’s outdoor club, the Wisconsin Hoofers, where their shared passion for the outdoors brought them together. She and Dale had four boys. She was known to colleagues and friends by her nickname, "Lyn." An enthusiastic sailor, she was the owner of a 50-foot schooner. As a mountaineer and skier, Cole climbed Mount Rainier twice and climbed mountains throughout New Zealand, Canada, Italy, and the United States. During their outdoor adventures, Cole and her family designed new camping and climbing equipment when they were unhappy with the commercially available options. Their designs included a sleeping bag, tent, ice picket, accessory strap, snowshoes, and a backpack.

== Career ==
Cole initially started a degree in engineering at the University of Wisconsin, but received failing grades for a course twice in a row because women were not permitted to become engineers in that college at the time. She subsequently obtained a Bachelor's degree in Social Anthropology from the University of Wisconsin. She later obtained a Bachelor's degree in English from the University of Washington, where she also earned a teaching certificate, though she decided she would never become a teacher.

Cole worked with Harvey Manning on his book Mountaineering: The Freedom of the Hills, a book for aspiring mountain climbers. Manning was so impressed with her editing abilities that he recommended her to be the managing editor of the journal Limnology and Oceanography for the Association for the Sciences of Limnology and Oceanography, whose office was then located on the University of Washington campus.

Raelyn Cole served as managing Editor of Limnology and Oceanography from 1965 to 1996. Her colleagues and family members describe her as a dedicated editor. In the words of colleague Peter Jumars,

"Editing for her was a part of her fabric, a piece of her human nature, an obsession should you wish."

== Awards and legacy ==
In 1996, Cole was recognized with the Tommy and Yvette Edmondson Distinguished Service Award (then called the ASLO Distinguished Service Award).

Cole passed away on December 17, 2015 at age 80. Her husband Dale was so taken by the response of the aquatic science publishing community that he sought a more permanent way to honor her contributions. Working with the leadership of the Association for the Sciences of Limnology and Oceanography, he established the Raelyn Cole Editorial Fellowship Fund, matched by ASLO. This fund created one of the first early career editorial fellowships in the aquatic sciences community.

Raelyn Cole is also remembered by the Dale & Raelyn Cole Hoofer Student Leader Training Fund hosted by the University of Wisconsin Foundation which supports the university’s mountaineering, sailing, and outing clubs.

== See also ==
- Mountaineering: The Freedom of the Hills
- Limnology and Oceanography
