= Susanne Menden-Deuer =

Marine scientist

- Education: University of Washington; University of Bonn
- Occupations: Oceanographer and marine scientist
- Scientific career
- Workplaces: University of Rhode Island
- Thesis: Linking individual foraging strategies with ecological dynamics : quantifying zooplankton movements in heterogeneous resource distributions (2004)

Susanne Menden-Deuer is an oceanographer and marine scientist known for her work on marine food webs, including their structure and function. As of 2022, she is president-elect of the Association for the Sciences of Limnology and Oceanography.

== Education and career ==
Menden-Deuer received her Diplom in 1996 from the University of Bonn. She went on to receive an M.Sc. (1998) and a Ph.D. (2004) from the University of Washington. Following her Ph.D. Menden-Deuer worked at Princeton University and Western Washington University. She moved to the University of Rhode Island in 2008, and was promoted to professor in 2017.

In 2022, the Association for the Sciences of Limnology and Oceanography announced Menden-Deuer as president-elect for the society.

== Research ==
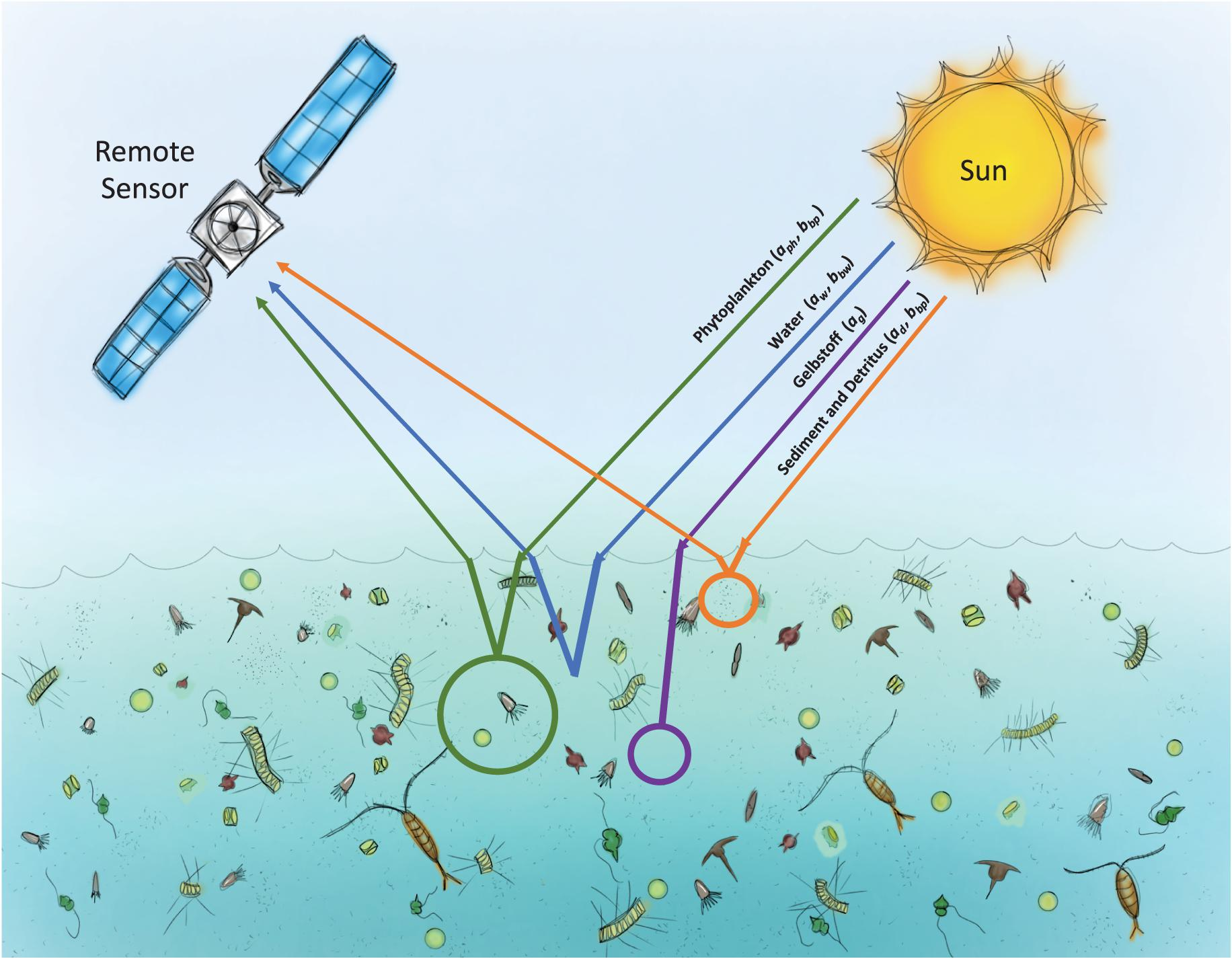
Menden-Deuer is known for her work on grazing in marine ecosystems.

Menden-Deuer is known for her work on the motility of plankton and their production. Her early work presented carbon-to-volume relationships for small marine organisms, a paper with Evelyn Lessard that was recognized in 2016 as one of the most highly cited papers in the journal Limnology and Oceanography. Subsequent work looked at foraging behavior by plankton organisms, and expanding methods used to quantify grazing activity in marine systems. Menden-Deuer and her student Elizabeth Harvey, determined that the phytoplankton Heterosigma akashiwo moves away from predators, a behavior not previously observed in phytoplankton.

As part of her work in the classroom, Menden-Deuer works with her students to edit Wikipedia.

== Selected publications ==
- Menden-Deuer, Susanne; Lessard, Evelyn J. (2000). "Carbon to volume relationships for dinoflagellates, diatoms, and other protist plankton". Limnology and Oceanography. 45 (3): 569–579. Bibcode:2000LimOc..45..569M. doi:10.4319/lo.2000.45.3.0569. S2CID 86062906.
- Saldarriaga, Juan F.; 'Max' Taylor, F. J. R.; Cavalier-Smith, Thomas; Menden-Deuer, Susanne; Keeling, Patrick J. (2004-05-18). "Molecular data and the evolutionary history of dinoflagellates". European Journal of Protistology. 40 (1): 85–111. doi:10.1016/j.ejop.2003.11.003. hdl:2429/16056. ISSN 0932-4739.
- Menden-Deuer, S; Lessard, Ej; Satterberg, J (2001). "Effect of preservation on dinoflagellate and diatom cell volume, and consequences for carbon biomass predictions". Marine Ecology Progress Series. 222: 41–50. Bibcode:2001MEPS..222...41M. doi:10.3354/meps222041. ISSN 0171-8630.
- Deuer, Susanne Menden; Grünbaum, Daniel (2006). "Individual foraging behaviors and population distributions of a planktonic predator aggregating to phytoplankton thin layers". Limnology and Oceanography. 51 (1): 109–116. Bibcode:2006LimOc..51..109D. doi:10.4319/lo.2006.51.1.0109. S2CID 16232161.
- Menden-Deuer, S; Lessard, Ej; Satterberg, J; Grünbaum, D (2005). "Growth rates and starvation survival of three species of the pallium-feeding, thecate dinoflagellate genus Protoperidinium". Aquatic Microbial Ecology. 41: 145–152. doi:10.3354/ame041145. ISSN 0948-3055.

== Awards and honors ==
In 2015, Menden-Deuer was named a fellow of the Association for the Sciences of Limnology and Oceanography, and in 2020 was named a sustaining fellow. She received the Hutner Award, named after Seymour Hutner, from the International Society of Protistologists in 2015.
