= Energy subsidy =

Government aid to reduce energy costs

Energy subsidies are measures that keep prices for customers below market levels, or for suppliers above market levels, or reduce costs for customers and suppliers. Energy subsidies may be direct cash transfers to suppliers, customers, or related bodies, as well as indirect support mechanisms, such as tax exemptions and rebates, price controls, trade restrictions, and limits on market access.

During FY 2016–22, most US federal subsidies were for renewable energy producers (primarily biofuels, wind, and solar), low-income households, and energy-efficiency improvements. During FY 2016–22, nearly half (46%) of federal energy subsidies were associated with renewable energy, and 35% were associated with energy end uses. Federal support for renewable energy of all types more than doubled, from $7.4 billion in FY 2016 to $15.6 billion in FY 2022.

The International Renewable Energy Agency tracked some $634 billion in energy-sector subsidies in 2020, and found that around 70% were fossil fuel subsidies. About 20% went to renewable power generation, 6% to biofuels and just over 3% to nuclear.

== Overview of all sources of energy ==
If governments choose to subsidize one particular source of energy more than another, that choice can impact the environment. That distinguishing factor informs the below discussion on all energy subsidies of all sources of energy in general.

Main arguments for energy subsidies are:

- Security of supply – subsidies are used to ensure adequate domestic supply by supporting indigenous fuel production in order to reduce import dependency, or supporting overseas activities of national energy companies, or to secure the electricity grid.
- Environmental and health improvement – subsidies are used to improve health by reducing air pollution, and to fulfill international climate pledges. For example the IEA says the purchase price of heat pumps should be subsidized.
- Economic benefits – subsidies in the form of reduced prices are used to stimulate particular economic sectors or segments of the population, e.g. alleviating poverty and increasing access to energy in developing countries. With regard to fossil fuel prices in particular, Ian Parry, the lead author of a 2021 IMF report said, "Some countries are reluctant to raise energy prices because they think it will harm the poor. But holding down fossil fuel prices is a highly inefficient way to help the poor, because most of the benefits accrue to wealthier households. It would be better to target resources towards helping poor and vulnerable people directly."
- Employment and social benefits – subsidies are used to maintain employment, especially in periods of economic transition. In 2021, with regard to fossil fuel prices in particular, Ipek Gençsü, at the Overseas Development Institute, said: "[Subsidy reform] requires support for vulnerable consumers who will be impacted by rising costs, as well for workers in industries which simply have to shut down. It also requires information campaigns, showing how the savings will be redistributed to society in the form of healthcare, education and other social services. Many people oppose subsidy reform because they see it solely as governments taking something away, and not giving back."

Main arguments against energy subsidies are:

- Some energy subsidies, such as the fossil fuel subsidies (oil, coal, and gas subsidies), counter the goal of sustainable development, as they may lead to higher consumption and waste, exacerbating the harmful effects of energy use on the environment, create a heavy burden on government finances and weaken the potential for economies to grow, undermine private and public investment in the energy sector. Also, most benefits from fossil fuel subsidies in developing countries go to the richest 20% of households.
- Impede the expansion of distribution networks and the development of more environmentally benign energy technologies, and do not always help the people that need them most.
- The study conducted by the World Bank finds that subsidies to the large commercial businesses that dominate the energy sector are not justified. However, under some circumstances it is reasonable to use subsidies to promote access to energy for the poorest households in developing countries. Energy subsidies should encourage access to the modern energy sources, not to cover operating costs of companies. The study conducted by the World Resources Institute finds that energy subsidies often go to capital intensive projects at the expense of smaller or distributed alternatives.

Types of energy subsidies are below. ("Fossil-fuel subsidies generally take two forms. Production subsidies...[and]...consumption subsidies."):

- Direct financial transfers – grants to suppliers; grants to customers; low-interest or preferential loans to suppliers.
- Preferential tax treatments – rebates or exemption on royalties, duties, supplier levies and tariffs; tax credit; accelerated depreciation allowances on energy supply equipment.
- Trade restrictions – quota, technical restrictions and trade embargoes.
- Energy-related services provided by government at less than full cost – direct investment in energy infrastructure; public research and development.
- Regulation of the energy sector – demand guarantees and mandated deployment rates; price controls; market-access restrictions; preferential planning consent and controls over access to resources.
- Failure to impose external costs – environmental externality costs; energy security risks and price volatility costs.
- Depletion Allowance – allows a deduction from gross income of up to ~27% for the depletion of exhaustible resources (oil, gas, minerals).

Overall, energy subsidies require coordination and integrated implementation, especially in light of globalization and increased interconnectedness of energy policies, thus their regulation at the World Trade Organization is often seen as necessary.

== Support for new technology ==
Early support of solar power by the United States and Germany greatly helped renewable energy commercialization to reduce greenhouse gas emissions worldwide, but may not have helped local manufacturing. Support for nuclear fusion continues, although it is not expected to be commercially viable in time to contribute to countries net zero targets. Energy storage research is also supported.

== Fossil fuel subsidies ==
Fossil fuel subsidies per capita

Fossil fuel subsidies as share of GDP

Fossil fuel subsidies are energy subsidies on fossil fuels. Under a narrow definition, fossil fuel subsidies totalled around $725 billion (0.6% of global GDP) to $900 billion in 2024. Under a more expansive definition, they totalled $6.7 trillion (5.8% of GDP). Most subsidy is for oil and natural gas. Subsidies are mainly on consumption, such as a lower sales tax on natural gas for residential heating; or subsidies on production, such as tax breaks on exploration for oil. Or they may be free or cheap negative externalities; such as air pollution or climate change due to burning gasoline, diesel and jet fuel. Some fossil fuel subsidies are via electricity generation, such as subsidies for coal-fired power stations.

Eliminating fossil fuel subsidies would reduce the health risks of air pollution, and would greatly reduce global carbon emissions thus helping to limit climate change. As of 2021, policy researchers estimate that substantially more money is spent on fossil fuel subsidies than on environmentally harmful agricultural subsidies or environmentally harmful water subsidies. The International Energy Agency says: "High fossil fuel prices hit the poor hardest, but subsidies are rarely well-targeted to protect vulnerable groups and tend to benefit better-off segments of the population."

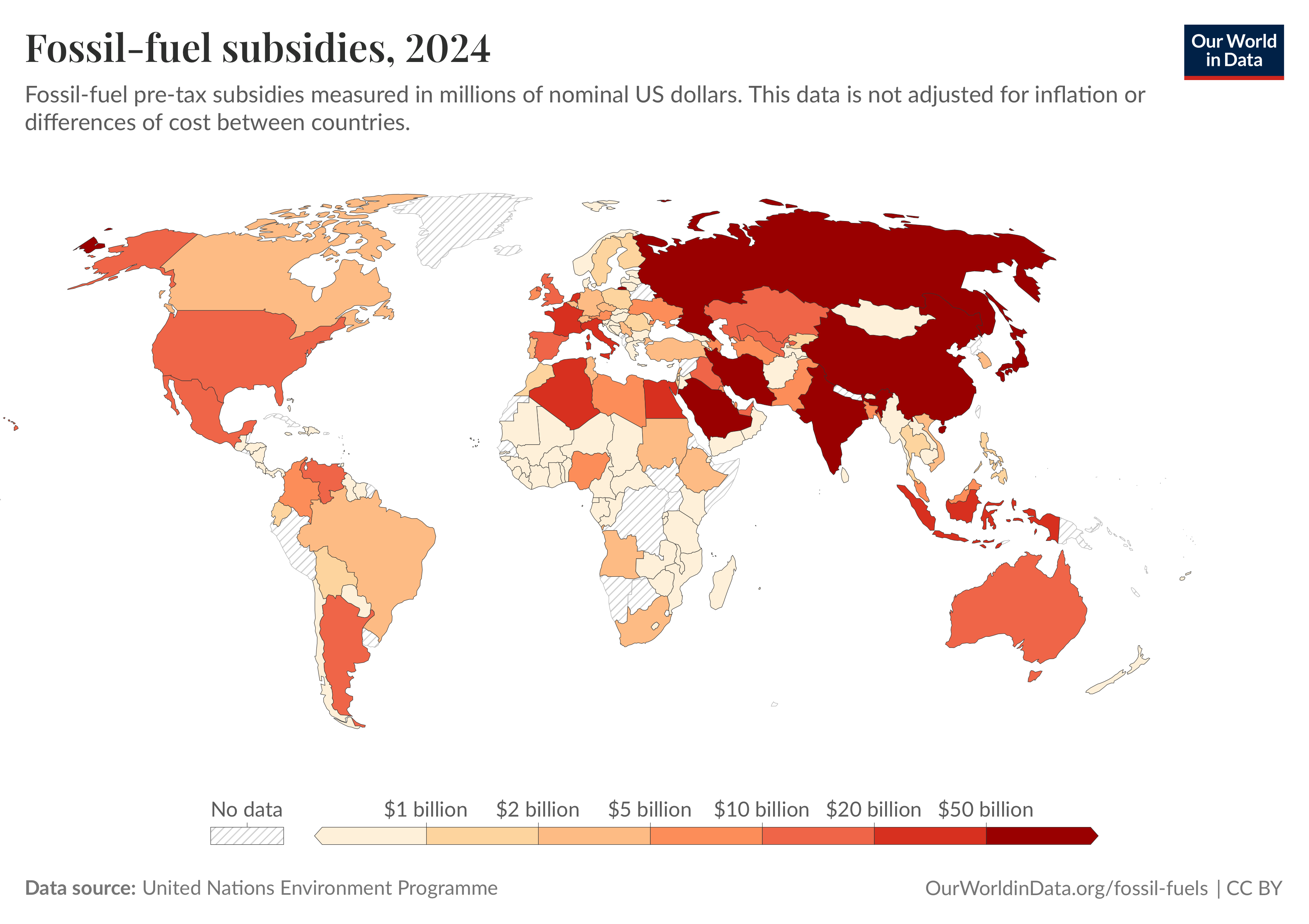
Fossil-fuel subsidies

Despite the G20 countries having pledged to phase-out inefficient fossil fuel subsidies, they continue because of voter demand, or for energy security. However the International Institute for Sustainable Development says that, done carefully, phasing-out fossil fuel subsidies would increase energy security.

== See also ==
- Building-integrated photovoltaics
- Corporate welfare
- Feed-in tariff
- Financial incentives for photovoltaics
- Fossil fuel subsidies
- Gasoline subsidies
- Government subsidies
- Renewable Energy Certificates
- Renewable energy commercialization
- Renewable energy payments
- Stranded assets

== Bibliography ==
- Difiglio, Prof. Carmine; Güray, Bora Şekip; Merdan, Ersin (November 2020). Turkey Energy Outlook. iicec.sabanciuniv.edu (Report). Sabanci University Istanbul International Center for Energy and Climate (IICEC). ISBN 978-605-70031-9-5.
