= Vertically Generalized Production Model =

Primary Production calculation model

The Vertically Generalized Production Model (VGPM) is a model commonly used to estimate primary production within the ocean. The VGPM was designed by Behrenfeld and Falkowski and was originally published in a 1997 article in Limnology and Oceanography. It is one of the most frequently used models for primary production estimation due to its ability to be applied to chlorophyll a data from satellites, and its relatively simple design. Chlorophyll a is a common measure of primary production, as it is a main component of photosynthesis.

Primary production is often measured using three variables: the biomass (or amount in weight) of the phytoplankton, the availability of light, and the rate of carbon fixation. The VGPM is now one of the most popular models to use for satellite chlorophyll data due to it being surface light dependent as well as using an estimated maximum value of primary production compared to the units of chlorophyll throughout the water column, known as PBopt. It also considers environmental factors that often influence primary production as well as allowing for variables often collected using remote satellites to derive the primary production without having to physically sample the water. This PBopt was found to be dependent on surface chlorophyll, and data for this can be collected using satellites. Satellites can only collect the parameters used to estimate primary production; they cannot calculate it themselves, which is why the need for a model to do so exists.

Because this is a generalized model, it is intended to reflect most accurately the open ocean. Other localized areas, especially coastal regions, may need to incorporate additional factors to get the most accurate representation of primary production. The values produced using the VGPM are estimates and there will be some level of uncertainty with using this model.
