= David Schindler =

American/Canadian limnologist (1940–2021)

- Born: August 3, 1940; Fargo, North Dakota, U.S.
- Died: March 4, 2021 (aged 80); Brisco, British Columbia, Canada
- Citizenship: American; Canadian
- Education: University of Minnesota; North Dakota State University; University of Oxford
- Known for: Experimental Lakes Area
- Scientific career
- Fields: Limnology; Ecology
- Institutions: University of Alberta
- Thesis: Energy Relations at Three Trophic Levels in an Aquatic Food Chain (1966)

David William Schindler, OC AOE FRSC FRS, (August 3, 1940 – March 4, 2021) was an American/Canadian limnologist. He held the Killam Memorial Chair and was Professor of Ecology in the Department of Biological Sciences at the University of Alberta in Edmonton, Alberta. He was notable for "innovative large-scale experiments" on whole lakes at the Experimental Lakes Area (ELA) which proved that "phosphorus controls the eutrophication (excessive algal blooms) in temperate lakes leading to the banning of phosphates in detergents. He was also known for his research on acid rain. In 1989, Schindler moved from the ELA to continue his research at the University of Alberta in Edmonton, with studies into fresh water shortages and the effects of climate disruption on Canada's alpine and northern boreal ecosystems. Schindler's research had earned him numerous national and international awards, including the Gerhard Herzberg Gold Medal, the First Stockholm Water Prize (1991) the Volvo Environment Prize (1998), and the Tyler Prize for Environmental Achievement (2006).

== Early life and career ==
Schindler was born August 3, 1940, in Fargo, North Dakota, and grew up in Barnesville, Minnesota. He held dual-citizenship in Canada and the U.S. He attended the University of Minnesota, and completed his bachelor's degree in zoology from North Dakota State University in 1962. After that, Schindler studied aquatic ecology at Oxford University as a Rhodes scholar. He worked first under Nikolaas Tinbergen. It was while working under Charles Sutherland Elton, one of the founders of ecology, who also established and led Oxford University's Bureau of Animal Population, that he began formulating an interdisciplinary ecosystem approach to study water and ecology. He received his PhD in ecology in 1966 from Oxford University. For two years he was an assistant professor in the Biology Department at Trent University.

== Research ==
=== Experimental Lakes Area ===
For fifty years, from 1968 to 2018, "...the world's most influential 58 lakes (and their watersheds)— IISD Experimental Lakes Area— these ordinary yet highly impactful lakes in a remote corner of northwestern Ontario, Canada have been the only ones in the world dedicated to long-term whole ecosystem experimentation."

— IISD-ELA Annual Report 2017-2018

From 1968 to 1989, Schindler directed the newly created Experimental Lakes Area (ELA), (Note: The ELA is now known as the IISD-ELA as it is now managed and operated by the International Institute for Sustainable Development (IISD).) of the now-defunct Fisheries Research Board of Canada near Kenora, Ontario. IISD-ELA uses the whole ecosystem approach and makes long-term, whole-lake investigations of freshwater focusing on eutrophication.

Schindler was awarded the Stockholm Water Prize in 1991 for this research into excess nutrification and acidification of freshwater lakes, a long-term study that used whole lakes as natural laboratories, using an integrated ecosystem approach. His work with ELA was described in a letter by Stanford University biological sciences professor Peter Vitousek supporting Schindler's receipt of the Tyler Award for Environmental Achievement award in 2006. Vitousek wrote that the "fertilization of entire lakes" the Experimental Lakes area "provided incorruptible findings" that proved that "phosphorus controls the eutrophication of temperate lakes." According to an April 28, 2006 University of Alberta article written about Schindler's receipt of the Tyler award, "In a series of landmark experiments conducted during the 1970s and 1980s, Schindler demonstrated that acid rain could begin destroying freshwater lakes at far lower levels than previously thought, and that phosphorus was the major cause of uncontrolled algae growth."

== Schindler's views on the oil sands tailings ponds ==
In a June 3, 2019, opinion piece in The Globe and Mail, Schindler cautioned against authorizing the "discharge of treated effluence" from oil sands tailings ponds into the Athabasca River with new regulations at both the provincial and federal level.

== Freshwater management policies ==
Schindler's large body of scientific work has influenced freshwater management policies including the regulation of toxins and the limitation of eutrophication and acid rain in Canada, the US, and Europe.

== Selected publications ==
In his 2008 book co-authored with John R. Vallentyne entitled The Algal Bowl: Overfertilization of the World's Freshwaters and Estuaries, Schindler warned about algal blooms and dead zones, "The fish-killing blooms that devastated the Great Lakes in the 1960s and 1970s haven't gone away; they've moved west into an arid world in which people, industry, and agriculture are increasingly taxing the quality of what little freshwater there is to be had here....This isn't just a prairie problem. Global expansion of dead zones caused by algal blooms is rising rapidly..."

In 2010 he co-authored a report on contaminants in fresh water systems in the area affected by the oil sands development entitled "Oil sands development contributes elements toxic at low concentrations to the Athabasca River and its tributaries."

In 2011 he was featured in the documentary film Peace Out.

== Selected awards and honours ==
Over his career Schindler received over a hundred awards and honours.

In 1991 Schindler was awarded the prestigious Stockholm Water Prize for research into excess nutrification and acidification of freshwater lakes. In awarding the prize, the committee noted that "A famous photograph of a Canadian lake drew attention to the effects of phosphorus and played an important part in generating public support for tackling the growing problem of eutrophication, an over-abundance of nutrients in aquatic systems and one of the most serious environmental threats facing freshwater bodies and semi-enclosed seas like the Baltic. That photograph has since been reproduced hundreds of times, for students, scientists and the general public."

In 2006 Schindler received the Tyler Award for Environmental Achievement, joining "luminaries as primatologist Jane Goodall; Sir Richard Doll, who established the link between lung cancer and cigarette smoking; and Nobel Prize laureates Paul J. Crutzen and Mario Molina."

In 2008 he was honoured with the Alberta Order of Excellence as professor and mentor and "an internationally celebrated scientist who has led efforts to protect fresh water resources in Canada and around the world. His groundbreaking research has served as a clarion call alerting authorities and the public to the effects of pollutants and climate change on the environment. "

In 2012, the Association for the Sciences of Limnology and Oceanography named the Yentsch-Schindler award after Clarice Yentsch and David Schindler. The award honors contributions of early career scientists.

He was awarded the Rachel Carson Award for his "lifetime of work on whole-ecosystem research in the Experimental Lakes Area (ELA) at the November 2016 world conference SETAC held in Orlando Florida.

=== Selected list of other awards and honours ===
- Royal Canadian Institute's Sandford Fleming Medal for Public Communication of Science (2009)
- Alberta Order of Excellence (2008) AB. Members Profile David W. Schindler. Alberta Order of Excellence.
- American Society of Limnology and Oceanography Ruth Patrick Award (2006)
- Alberta Centennial Medal (2005)
- Officer of the Order of Canada (2004)
- Lifetime Achievement Award, Canadian Institute for Environmental Law and Policy (2004)
- Killam Prize, Canada Council for the Arts (2003)
- Elected Foreign Member, Royal Swedish Academy of Engineering Sciences (2003)
- Queen's Golden Jubilee Medal, Office of the Governor General of Canada (2002)
- City of Edmonton, Award of Distinction (2002)
- Elected Member, National Academy of Sciences (USA) (2002)
- Environment Canada, EcoLogo/Natural Marine Environmental Award (2002)
- Gerhard Herzberg Canada Gold Medal for Science and Engineering, Natural Sciences and Engineering Research Council (Canada) (2001)
- Award of Excellence, Natural Sciences and Engineering Research Council (Canada) (2001)
- Fellow of the Royal Society (2001)
- NSERC Award of Excellence (2000)
- First Romanowski Medal, Royal Society of Canada (1994)
- Manning Award of Distinction for Innovation in Science (1993)
- First Stockholm Water Prize, Stockholm Water Foundation (1991)
- Hutchinson Medal, American Society of Limnology and Oceanography (1985)
- Naumann-Thienemann Medal of the International Limnological Society (1988)
- Frank Rigler Award of the Canadian Limnological Society (1984)
- Fellow of the Royal Society of Canada (1983)
- Rhodes Scholarship, 1962–1966
