= Ocean-Land-Atmosphere Research =

- Discipline: Oceanography
- Language: English
- Edited by: Dake Chen, Robert W. Howarth

Publication details
- History: 2021–present
- Publisher: American Association for the Advancement of Science
- Frequency: Continuous
- Open access: Yes
- License: Creative Commons Attribution License
- Impact factor: 5.4 (2025)

Standard abbreviations
- ISO 4: Ocean-Land-Atmos. Res.

Indexing
- ISSN: 2771-0378
- LCCN: 2021202717
- OCLC no.: 1288013666

Links
- Journal homepage; Online access

Ocean-Land-Atmosphere Research is a peer-reviewed open access scientific journal covering marine, terrestrial, and atmospheric studies. It was established in 2021 and is published by the American Association for the Advancement of Science in affiliation with the Southern Marine Science and Engineering Guangdong Laboratory (SML; Zhuhai, China). The journal is editorially independent from the Science family of journals and SML is responsible for all content in the journal, which is published under a Creative Commons Attribution License.

== Abstracting and indexing ==
The journal is abstracted and indexed in the Directory of Open Access Journals, Scopus, Astrophysics Data System, CAB Abstracts, GeoRef, Inspec, and the Emerging Sources Citation Index. It has a 2025 Journal Impact Factor (JIF) of 5.4, ranking 6/67 in the category of Oceanography and 21/395 in the category of Environmental Sciences.

== See also ==
- Annual Review of Marine Science
- Limnology and Oceanography Letters
- ICES Journal of Marine Science
