= Patricia Soranno =

American limnologist

Patricia A. Soranno
- Education: University of Wisconsin Madison
- Scientific career
- Workplaces: Michigan State University
- Thesis: Phosphorus cycling in the Lake Mendota ecosystem : internal versus external nutrient supply (1995)

Patricia Soranno is an academic at Michigan State University known for her work on limnology, landscape ecology, and data-intensive ecology. She is an elected fellow of the American Association for the Advancement of Science and was the founding editor-in-chief of Limnology and Oceanography: Letters.

== Education and career ==
Soranno received her B.S. from University of Notre Dame in 1987 and her M.S. from the University of Wisconsin–Madison in 1991. In 1995 she earned her Ph.D. from the University of Wisconsin-Madison where she worked on phosphorus cycling in Lake Mendota. She moved to Michigan State University, where she was promoted to professor in 2012. Soranno was the inaugural editor in chief for Limnology and Oceanography Letters, a role she held from 2015 until 2019.

== Research ==
Soranno is known for her research examining freshwater ecology and multiple ecological scales. Her early work modeled non-point sources of phosphorus and quantified the spatial patterns in chemistry and biology across a series of lakes in North America. She moved on to classification of lakes and defined scaling parameters to investigate ecological problems in lakes. Soranno's research has determined the degree of water quality monitoring for lakes is less in communities with more under-represented groups, and she has examined the prevalence of data sharing in different scientific fields.

== Selected publications ==
- Soranno, P. A.; Hubler, S. L.; Carpenter, S. R.; Lathrop, R. C. (1996). "Phosphorus Loads to Surface Waters: A Simple Model to Account for Spatial Pattern of Land Use". Ecological Applications. 6 (3): 865–878. doi:10.2307/2269490. ISSN 1051-0761. JSTOR 2269490.
- Soranno, Patricia A. (1999-08-31). "Spatial Variation among Lakes within Landscapes: Ecological Organization along Lake Chains". Ecosystems. 2 (5): 395–410. doi:10.1007/s100219900089. hdl:2027.42/42434. ISSN 1432-9840.
- Soranno, Patricia A; Cheruvelil, Kendra S; Bissell, Edward G; Bremigan, Mary T; Downing, John A; Fergus, Carol E; Filstrup, Christopher T; Henry, Emily N; Lottig, Noah R; Stanley, Emily H; Stow, Craig A; Tan, Pang-Ning; Wagner, Tyler; Webster, Katherine E (2014). "Cross-scale interactions: quantifying multi-scaled cause–effect relationships in macrosystems". Frontiers in Ecology and the Environment. 12 (1): 65–73. doi:10.1890/120366. ISSN 1540-9295.
- Cheruvelil, Kendra S; Soranno, Patricia A; Weathers, Kathleen C; Hanson, Paul C; Goring, Simon J; Filstrup, Christopher T; Read, Emily K (2014). "Creating and maintaining high-performing collaborative research teams: the importance of diversity and interpersonal skills". Frontiers in Ecology and the Environment. 12 (1): 31–38. doi:10.1890/130001. ISSN 1540-9295.
- Soranno, Patricia; Hanly, Patrick; Webster, Katherine; Wagner; McDonald; Shuvo; Schliep; Reinl; McCullough; Tan; Lottig; Spence-Cheruvelil, Kendra (2025). "Abrupt changes in algal biomass of thousands of US lakes are related to climate and are more likely in low-disturbance watersheds". Proceedings of the National Academy of Sciences of the United States of America. 122 (9). doi:10.1073/pnas.2416172122. ISSN 1091-6490. PMC 11892623.

== Awards and honors ==
Soranno was named a fellow of the Association for the Sciences of Limnology and Oceanography in 2018, and was elected a fellow of the American Association for the Advancement of Science in 2019. In 2020, the Ecological Society of America elected her as a fellow.
