= Limnology and Oceanography =

Bimonthly peer-reviewed journal

- Subject: Limnology Oceanography
- Language: English
- Edited by: K. David Hambright

Publication details
- History: 1956–present
- Publisher: Wiley for the Association for the Sciences of Limnology and Oceanography
- Frequency: Bimonthly
- Impact factor: 5.019 (2021)

Standard abbreviations
- ISO 4: Limnol. Oceanogr.

Indexing
- ISSN: 0024-3590 (print); 1939-5590 (web)

Links
- Journal homepage

Limnology and Oceanography (L&O) is a bimonthly peer-reviewed scientific journal focused on all aspects of limnology and oceanography. It was established in 1956 and originally published through the Association for the Sciences of Limnology and Oceanography (ASLO), and now published in partnership with John Wiley and Sons. Occasionally, L&O publishes special issues focused on a specific topic in aquatic systems in addition to the six regular issues published each year.

== List of editors ==
- David Frey (1956–1959)
- Kenneth Rae (1959–1963)
- Francis Richards (1963–-1967)
- Yvette Hardman Edmondson (1967–1986)
- Peter Jumars (1986–1992)
- David Kirchman (1992–1998)
- Everett Fee (1998–2014)
- Robert W. Howarth (2014–2019)
- K. David Hambright (2019– )

== See also ==
- Association for the Sciences of Limnology and Oceanography
- Aquatic science
- Limnology
- Limnology and Oceanography Letters
- Limnology and Oceanography: Methods
- Limnology and Oceanography Bulletin
- Oceanography
- Raelyn Cole
