= Amina Pollard =

American limnologist and ecologist

- Education: Lawrence University Bachelors of Arts (1995); Wright State University Masters of Science (1997); University of Wisconsin-Madison PhD (2002)
- Known for: Limnology
- Scientific career
- Workplaces: United States Environmental Protection Agency

Amina Pollard is an American limnologist and ecologist at the U.S. Environmental Protection Agency (EPA).

Pollard leads the U.S. EPA National Lakes Assessment, which seeks to provide information on the health of lakes, ponds, and reservoirs across the United States. She currently serves on the Association for the Sciences of Limnology and Oceanography (ASLO) board of directors (2018-2021), chairs ASLO's annual awards committee, and is a scientific advisor to Canada's Lake Pulse research program.

== Education and early career ==
Pollard received her BA from Lawrence University in 1995 and a Master's degree from Wright State University in 1997. In 2002, she received her PhD from the University of Wisconsin-Madison's Center for Limnology under the supervision of John Magnuson and Thomas Frost. Pollard studied how the structure and connectedness of streams and lakes affects invertebrate communities within those systems. She also measured the consequences of dam removal on stream benthic invertebrate communities.

After graduating from the University of Wisconsin, Pollard starting working for the EPA as a postdoctoral fellow and has remained at the EPA her entire career.

== Career ==
At the EPA, Pollard leads the National Lakes Assessment (NLA), a standardized and coordinated effort to sample lakes in the U.S. The NLA provides publicly available colocated biological, chemical, habitat, and human use metrics for representative lakes every 5 years starting in 2007. Comparing the 2007 and 2012 NLA sampling efforts allowed Pollard and her colleagues to determine that the proportion of "blue" lakes was declining while the proportion of "murky" lakes was increasing in the continental U.S. The increase in murky lakes - an indicator of poor water quality - was due to the combined effect of increased eutrophication and dissolved organic carbon inputs from the terrestrial environment. Pollard and colleagues also determined that the murky lakes were less efficient at transferring energy up the food web (to zooplankton, for example), despite having the highest rates of primary production. The murky lakes also had the highest concentration of microcystin, which are a class of toxins produced by cyanobacteria and are potentially toxic to human health in high enough concentrations. Pollard has also shown that combining national-scale datasets, such as the NLA, with local-scale data improves prediction accuracy of microcystin concentrations at the local level.

Research by Pollard and colleagues has advanced our understanding of how environmental change and the structure of landscapes influence freshwater communities and ecosystems. Pollard led and contributed to work characterizing how the connections between streams, lakes, and wetlands within landscape mosaics control the movement and community structure of freshwater organisms. In a study exploring changing nutrient concentrations in freshwaters, Pollard and colleagues noted that both lakes and streams were increasing in total phosphorus (TP) concentration in the continental U.S., another indicator of eutrophication, and the most notable increases were in relatively pristine catchments.

Pollard also contributed to the U.S. EPA's Causal Analysis/Diagnosis Decision Information System (CADDIS) sections on analytical examples and data analysis. CADDIS represents an ongoing effort to assist scientists, managers, and engineers conduct data-informed causal assessments to identify sources of impairment to aquatic organisms.

In 2018, Pollard became the first African-American woman plenary speaker at the Association for the Sciences of Limnology and Oceanography annual meeting. She is currently the ASLO's Awards Chair.

In 2021, Pollard became a candidate to become a "Member at Large" on the Board of Directors of Association for the Sciences of Limnology and Oceanography (ASLO).

== Awards ==
- Friends of North American Lake Management Society Award.
- Embassy Science Fellow in Uruguay
- US EPA Science and Technology Achievement Award
- US EPA Gold Medal for Exceptional Service

In 2018, Pollard and the EPA NLA Team were nominated by Lisa Borre on behalf of the NALMS Government Affairs Committee for the Friends of North American Lake Management Society Award. Pollard and her team won the award for their coordinated effort with the EPA, states, tribes, federal agencies, and other organizations to implement the National Lakes Assessment (NLA), a large-scale statistical survey of the condition of our nation's lakes, ponds, and reservoirs.
