= Lake 226 =

Lake in Ontario, Canada

Coordinates: 49°41′22.9″N 93°44′41.6″W

Lake 226 is a lake in Canada's Experimental Lakes Area (ELA) in Ontario. The ELA is a freshwater and fisheries research facility that operated these experiments alongside Fisheries and Oceans Canada and Environment Canada. In 1968 this area in northwest Ontario was set aside for limnological research, aiming to study the watershed of the 58 small lakes in this area. The ELA projects began as a response to the claim that carbon was the limiting agent causing eutrophication of lakes rather than phosphorus, and that monitoring phosphorus in the water would be a waste of money. This claim was made by soap and detergent companies, as these products do not biodegrade and can cause buildup of phosphates in water supplies that lead to eutrophication. The theory that carbon was the limiting agent was quickly debunked by the ELA Lake 227 experiment that began in 1969, which found that carbon could be drawn from the atmosphere to remain proportional to the input of phosphorus in the water. Experimental Lake 226 was then created to test phosphorus' impact on eutrophication by itself.

== Lake ecosystem ==
Location of the ELA in Ontario, Canada

=== Geography ===
The ELA lakes were far from human activities, therefore allowing the study of environmental conditions without human interaction. Lake 226 was specifically studied over a four-year period, from 1973–1977 to test eutrophication. Lake 226 itself is a 16.2 ha double basin lake located on highly metamorphosed granite known as Precambrian granite. The depth of the lake was measured in 1994 to be 14.7 m for the northeast basin and 11.6 m for the southeast basin. Lake 226 had a total lake volume of 9.6 × 10^{5} m^{3}, prior to the lake being additionally studied for drawdown alongside other ELA lakes. Due to this relatively small fetch of Lake 226, wind action is minimized, preventing resuspension of epilimnetic sediments.

=== Eutrophication experiment ===
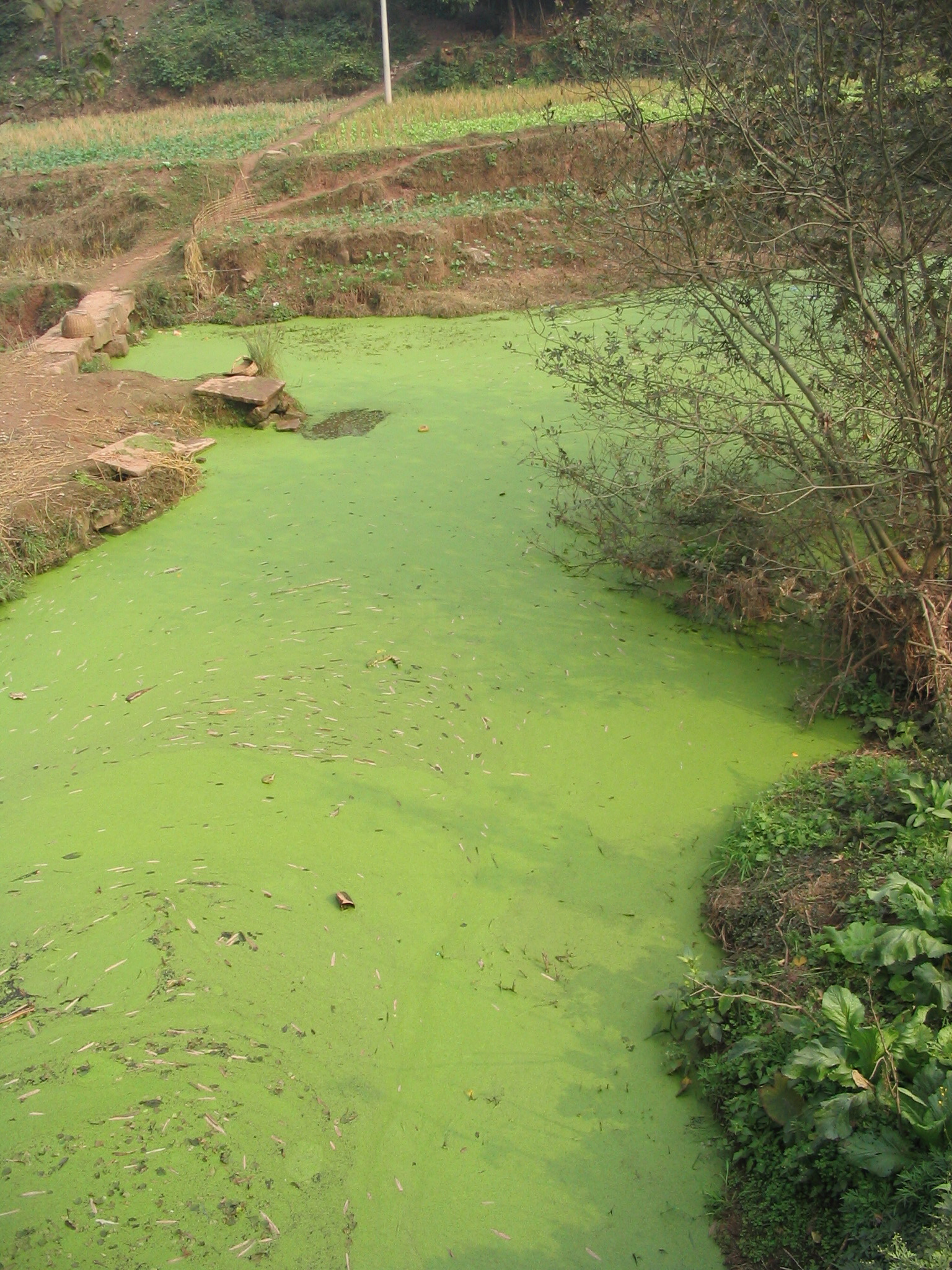
Example of Lake Eutrophication from Lake Sichuan

To test the effects of fertilization on water quality and algae blooms, Lake 226 was split in half with a curtain. This curtain divided the northeast basin (NE) from the southwest (SW) basin. The southwest basin was fertilized with carbon (C) and nitrogen (N) while the northeast basin was fertilized with phosphorus, carbon and nitrogen. This fertilization with phosphorus (P) led half of the lake to develop algal blooms, primarily Cyanobacteria, while the side without phosphorus did not. This caused the fertilized side with phosphorus to be classified as eutrophic, making this experiment a study of eutrophication.

The N:P ratio in Lake 226 had less nitrogen than required to balance the necessary phosphorus amount for successful algae production, which must have occurred to create a eutrophic water ecosystem. By having less nitrogen in the lake it was hypothesized that Lake 226 was able to pull nitrogen from the atmosphere to cause this algal production. This further supported the belief that the input of nitrogen and carbon as fertilizer was not important because the biogeochemical mechanisms can regulate these elements closely with P. Nitrogen being the limiting element compared to phosphorus also caused the hypothesis that the reason Cyanobacteria was so prominent in the lake was because they are nitrogen fixing.

==== Secchi depth ====
Secchi depth is used to measure the visibility of the water under the surface level, and is measured by lowering a secchi disk into the water, lowering it until the disk is no longer visible, and then raising it until it is visible again. You then take the mean of these two values to record the secchi depth of a lake to note where the light attenuates. Prior to the beginning of the eutrophication experiment, lake 226 NE had an average secchi depth of 3.76 in 1971. During the experiment, when lake 226 NE was experiencing algal bloom production from the phosphorus application, the average secchi depth in 1974 was 1.94. When only nitrogen and carbon were added to lake 226 in the SE basin, there was no decrease in secchi depth over the experiment.

==== Results ====
Since carbon and nitrogen were not increasing the likelihood of algal bloom production, controlling the rate of P in the water was discovered to be the crucial element. Discovering that P is the crucial element influenced the government to remove solely phosphorus from the wastewater and saved a lot of money as limiting nitrogen and phosphorus is a much more expensive task if not necessary.

==== Legislation ====
This study led to the discovery that phosphorus was an essential nutrient in the formation of these algal blooms, and thus began the legislative change for the ELA to control the impact of phosphorus in lake ecosystems. Unfortunately, this new agreement with legislature did not lead to the controlling of phosphorus from non-point sources. The state of Canadian lakes is currently being threatened by phosphorus as agricultural phosphorus is not being controlled well enough.

==== Fish ====
There were reports of the survivability of fish between these basins that found that lake whitefish in the NE basin grew faster and produced more than in the SW basin of Lake 226. Annually there were no differences in the survivability of the fish, but at age 0 the fish survival rate was higher in the NE basin. The population of whitefish were also used in 2014 to run tests to test if the experiments on these Canadian lakes caused radioactivity in the fish. Lake 226 was of specific interest in this study since there were historical measurements of 137Cs and 226Ra concentrations that were available for comparison.

=== Drawdown experiment ===
A drawdown study was conducted on Lake 226 to compare the effect of the ELA lakes drawdown on the benthic and planktonic plant communities of a small oligotrophic lake. The ELA lakes included in this study were 224, 239, 240, and 373, to serve as a reference for lake 226. This study was conducted by allowing the lake to be drawn down 2 m during the winter of 1994–1995 and approximately 3 m during the winters of 1995–1996 and 1996–1997.

==== Phytoplankton ====
The phytoplankton communities were studied from 1992–1997 to assess the average biomass of phytoplankton in the different basins of lake 226. This study was done as a factor of the drawdown study conducted on Lake 226 following the eutrophication study, after the water chemistry and phytoplankton concentrations returned to their natural conditions. In comparison to three reference lakes, Lakes 224, 239 and 373, Lake 226 had a similar phytoplankton composition, however some algal groups were more abundant, therefore Lake 226 had a more abundant planktonic biomass and productivity than most lakes. However, following the conclusion of the experiment, there were no major observable effects of lake drawdown on phytoplankton communities, conflicting with the hypothesis by Turner et al. (2005) that believed that drawdown would release nutrients in the lake, thus causing phytoplankton to bloom.

== See also ==
- Lake 227
- Peter and Paul Lakes
