= Diane Orihel =

Freshwater ecologist

Diane Orihel is a freshwater ecologist. She is currently an Assistant Professor in Aquatic Ecotoxicology at Queen's University and Director of the QE3 Research Group.

During her PhD, Orihel was dubbed “Lady of the Lakes” by science magazine Nature for being a leading voice in saving the Experimental Lakes Area, now known as the IISD-ELA. After funding cuts by the Canadian government, Orihel put writing her PhD thesis on hold to spearhead the Coalition to Save ELA for most of 2012. Her efforts seemed to be in vain for months, and staff members had already started dismantling the site in spring 2013 when the IISD announced they had made a deal with the Ontario provincial government to keep the site open through the summer. After this, the provinces of Ontario and Manitoba promised $2 million a year and $900,000 over six years respectively to keep the ELA running.

In April 2014, the IISD announced that they had secured long-term funding for the ELA in cooperation with the Governments of Ontario and Canada. Orihel has received a Queen Elizabeth II Diamond Jubilee Medal for her efforts to save the ELA
