= Fossil fuel subsidies =

Financial support by governments for coal, oil, gas, and electricity generated from them

Fossil fuel subsidies per capita

Fossil fuel subsidies as share of GDP

Fossil fuel subsidies are energy subsidies on fossil fuels. Under a narrow definition, fossil fuel subsidies totalled around $725 billion (0.6% of global GDP) to $900 billion in 2024. Under a more expansive definition, they totalled $6.7 trillion (5.8% of GDP). Most subsidy is for oil and natural gas. Subsidies are mainly on consumption, such as a lower sales tax on natural gas for residential heating; or subsidies on production, such as tax breaks on exploration for oil. Or they may be free or cheap negative externalities; such as air pollution or climate change due to burning gasoline, diesel and jet fuel. Some fossil fuel subsidies are via electricity generation, such as subsidies for coal-fired power stations.

Eliminating fossil fuel subsidies would reduce the health risks of air pollution, and would greatly reduce global carbon emissions thus helping to limit climate change. As of 2021, policy researchers estimate that substantially more money is spent on fossil fuel subsidies than on environmentally harmful agricultural subsidies or environmentally harmful water subsidies. The International Energy Agency says: "High fossil fuel prices hit the poor hardest, but subsidies are rarely well-targeted to protect vulnerable groups and tend to benefit better-off segments of the population."

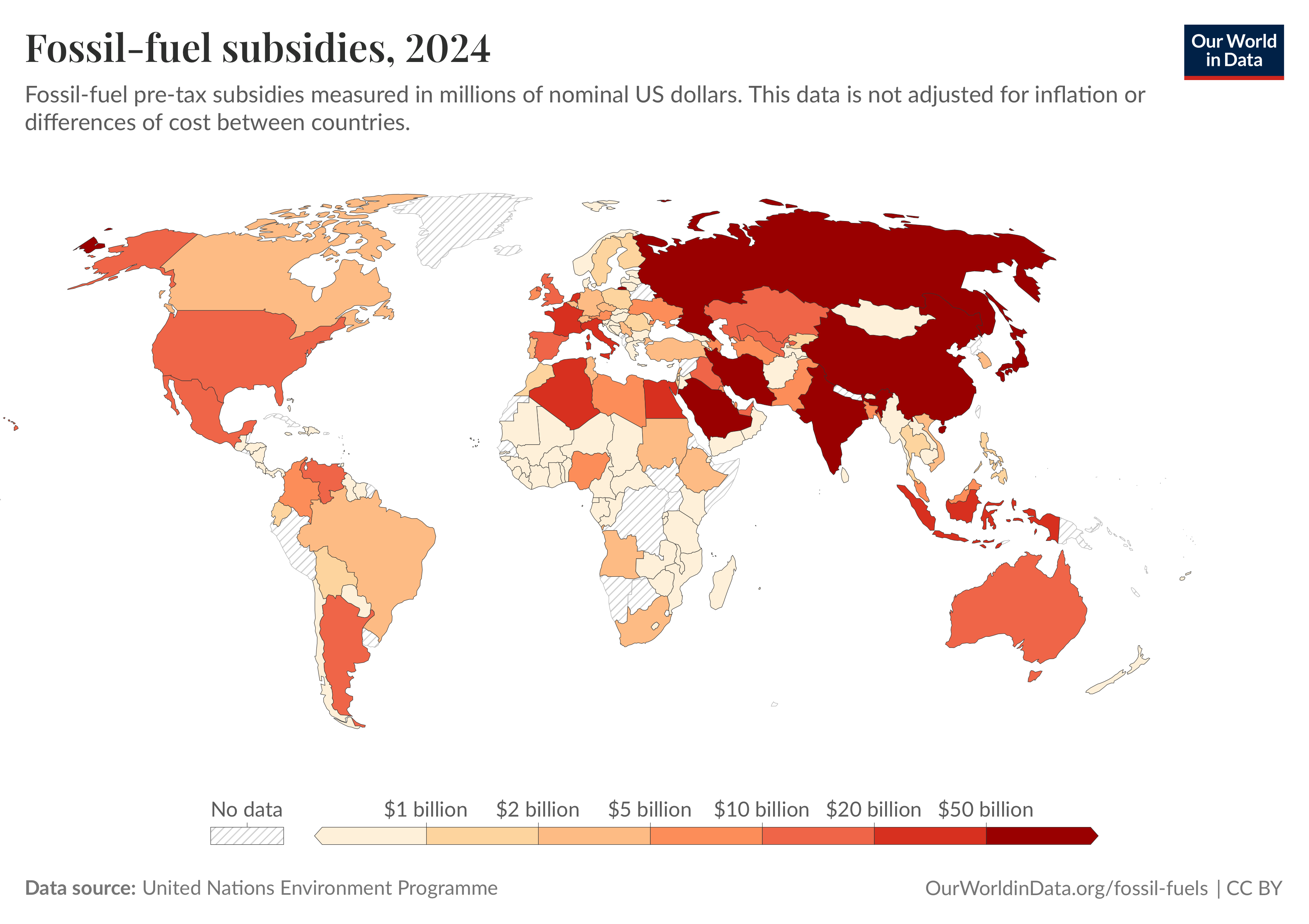
Fossil-fuel subsidies

Despite the G20 countries having pledged to phase-out inefficient fossil fuel subsidies, they continue because of voter demand, or for energy security. However the International Institute for Sustainable Development says that, done carefully, phasing-out fossil fuel subsidies would increase energy security.

== Definition ==
Fossil fuel subsidies have been described as "any government action that lowers the cost of fossil fuel energy production, raises the price received by energy producers, or lowers the price paid by energy consumers." Including negative externalities such as health costs results in a much larger total. Thus by the IMF definition they are far larger than by the OECD and International Energy Agency (IEA) definitions.

Subsidies for electricity and heat may be taken into account, depending on the share produced by fossil fuels. Sometimes there are disputes about what definition to use: for example the UK government said in 2021 that it uses the IEA definition and does not subsidize fossil fuels, but others said the same year that under the OECD definition it does.

== Measurement ==
Subsidies may be estimated by adding up direct subsidies from government, comparing prices in a country to world market prices, and sometimes attempting to include the cost of damage to human health and the climate. Setting fossil fuel prices that reflect their true cost would cut global CO_{2} emissions by 10% by 2030, according to the IPCC in 2023. The International Institute for Sustainable Development say that G7 countries should reveal their subsidies every year under Sustainable Development Goal (SDG) indicator 12.c.1 (fossil fuel subsidies).

The fiscal cost of government support for fossil fuels was 1.1 trillion USD in 2023. Most (90%) of which is related to the consumption of fossil fuels. The fiscal cost of support for residential users was 189 billion USD in 2023, while for manufacturing and other industries it was 103.8 billion USD. The OECD said that "Most of this support lacked systematic targeting towards those in greatest need, raising both equity and efficiency concerns." Economic incentives to decarbonise from fuel taxes, carbon taxes, emissions trading systems (ETSs) and price-reducing support mechanisms - summarised in the net Effective Carbon Rate (Net ECR) - averaged EUR 14.0/tCO2e in 2023. The share of GHG emissions covered by a positive Net ECR was 42%; 27% of GHG emissions are covered by explicit carbon prices (carbon taxes or ETSs).

The OECD said that "The high fiscal cost of government support for fossil fuels and low Net ECR highlight the challenges of staying on track with net zero commitments in the face of economic and geopolitical pressures. Reforms should focus on better targeting those most in need and phasing out inefficient support for fossil fuels as soon as possible to enable the release of much-needed resources for the net zero transition and help accelerate innovation for energy efficiency. Given the high costs of inaction, governments should reaffirm and implement their SDG commitment to phase out and reform inefficient support to fossil fuels to align fiscal policy with climate goals."

== Effects ==
Subsidies on consumption reduce the price of energy for end consumers, for example the cost of gasoline for car drivers in Iran. This may win votes at elections and some people in government say it helps poorer citizens.

The consensus among economists is that the rich get most absolute benefit from fossil fuel subsidies, for example the poorest people do not usually own cars. But removing the subsidies may hit poor people via indirect price increases such as food prices, so they get a lot of benefit relative to their total income. Producers, such as oil companies, say that increasing taxes on them would cause unemployment and reduce national energy security.

=== Health effects ===
Subsidies are estimated to cause hundreds of thousands of deaths from air pollution each year.

=== Economic effects ===
Fossil fuel subsidies are a negative carbon price and use government money that could be spent on other things. The International Monetary Fund says that by encouraging excess energy use they can make countries more vulnerable to variation in international energy prices. However some governments say that the subsidies are necessary to shield citizens from such variation. According to the International Energy Agency (IEA) phasing out fossil fuel subsidies would benefit energy markets, climate change mitigation and government budgets.

=== Environmental effects ===
Subsidies affect the environment and removing them would save the carbon budget and help limit climate change.

== Phase-out ==
Many economists recommend replacing consumption subsidies with direct payments targeted at poor people or households. The best way to use the money saved will likely require country specific studies. However phase-out is politically difficult.

== History ==
Tax breaks for oil and gas exploration have been in place since at least the early 20th century.

== Subsidies by fuel ==
In 2023, the OECD estimated that coal subsidies amounted to 27.7 billion USD, oil to 400 billion USD, and gas to 343 billion USD.

== Subsidies by country ==
The International Energy Agency estimates that governments subsidised consumption of fossil fuels by US $1 trillion in 2022. At their meeting in September 2009 the G-20 countries committed to "rationalize and phase out over the medium term inefficient fossil fuel subsidies that encourage wasteful consumption". Many say that all fossil fuel subsidies are inefficient.

The 2010s saw many other countries reducing energy subsidies, for instance in July 2014 Ghana abolished all diesel and gasoline subsidies, whilst in the same month Egypt raised diesel prices 63% as part of a raft of reforms intended to remove subsidies within 5 years.

In Sept, 2021, the IMF produced a working paper with estimates for the subsidies caused by the gap between the efficient price of fossil fuels and user prices. "Underpricing for local air pollution costs is the largest contributor to global fossil fuel subsidies, accounting for 42 percent, followed by global warming costs (29 percent), other local externalities such as congestion and road accidents (15 percent), explicit subsidies (8 percent) and foregone consumption tax revenue (6 percent)." Globally, fossil fuel subsidies were $5.9 trillion which amounts to 6.8% of GDP in 2020 and are expected to rise to 7.4% in 2025.

The table below shows excerpts from a 2021 IMF study for 20 countries with biggest subsidies. It also shows the biggest component of explicit subsidies, electricity costs, and of implicit subsidies, coal. See these references for complete data: (Units are billions of 2021 US dollars.)

Fossil fuel subsidies - top 20 countries US$ billions
2020	Explicit Subsidies		Implicit Subsidies		Total
	Electricity	Total	Coal	Total	Total
China	13.69	15.73	1,391.78	2,187.50	2,203.23
United States	0.00	16.06	121.45	646.00	662.05
Russia	25.14	77.36	195.26	445.26	522.62
India	8.71	16.18	162.72	230.89	247.07
Japan	2.74	4.75	57.69	164.80	169.55
Saudi Arabia	8.72	53.75	0.00	104.36	158.11
Iran	26.51	41.72	4.59	111.05	152.77
Indonesia	5.49	11.96	32.85	115.13	127.09
Turkey	0.24	4.11	52.59	112.61	116.72
Egypt	7.32	9.69	1.89	95.38	105.07
Germany	0.00	3.43	25.50	68.32	71.75
Korea, South	0.00	0.58	28.93	68.39	68.98
Canada	2.43	10.34	3.04	53.69	64.03
South Africa	5.62	5.72	30.41	44.84	50.56
Kazakhstan	4.57	9.93	19.11	37.05	46.98
Taiwan	1.67	2.58	25.42	43.55	46.13
Australia	2.14	5.57	14.85	38.92	44.49
Ukraine	4.57	7.76	28.76	35.87	43.63
Malaysia	0.90	3.52	5.52	39.50	43.02
Brazil	0.00	5.80	4.60	37.17	42.97
World total	189.53	454.79	2,362.26	5,402.57	5,857.36

=== Canada ===
The Canadian federal government offers subsidies for fossil fuel exploration and production and Export Development Canada regularly provides financing to oil and gas companies. Canada committed to phasing out inefficient fossil fuel subsidies by 2025, but that didn’t happen. The government reviews itself. Canadian provincial governments also offer subsidies for the consumption of fossil fuels. For example, Saskatchewan offers a fuel tax exemption for farmers and a sales tax exemption for natural gas used for heating.

=== China ===
Although the 15th Five-Year Plan supports clean energy it also includes ‘strengthening the clean and efficient utilisation of fossil energy’. The energy policy of China emphasises energy security, and as of 2026 coal-fired power plants are still being built. The OECD details various fossil fuel subsidies. The Centre for Research on Energy and Clean Air suggests that capacity payments to coal-fired power plants should be reformed to reward flexibility and system value.

=== India ===
In financial year 2025 the IISD has estimated fossil fuel subsidies at 430 billion rupees, or 2.3% of GDP.

=== Iran ===
Contrary to the subsidy reform plan's objectives, under President Rouhani the volume of Iranian subsidies given to its citizens on fossil fuel increased 42% in 2019 to over 15% of Iran's GDP and 16% of total global energy subsidies. This has made Iran the world's largest subsidizer of energy prices. This situation is leading to highly wasteful consumption patterns, large budget deficits, price distortions in its entire economy, pollution and very lucrative (multi-billion dollars) contraband (because of price differentials) with neighbouring countries each year by rogue elements within the Iranian government supporting the status-quo.

=== Libya ===
Libya had the highest subsidy by percent GDP in 2020 at 17.5%.

=== Russia ===
Russia holds the world's largest natural gas reserves (27% of total), the second-largest coal reserves, and the eighth-largest oil reserves. Russia is the world's third-largest energy subsidizer as of 2015. The country subsidizes electricity and natural gas as well as oil extraction. Approximately 60% of the subsidies go to natural gas, with the remainder spent on electricity (including under-pricing of gas delivered to power stations). For oil extraction the government gives tax exemptions and duty reductions amounting to about 22 billion dollars a year. Some of the tax exemptions and duty reductions also apply to natural gas extraction, though the majority is allocated for oil. The large subsidies of Russia are costly and it is recommended in order to help the economy that Russia lowers its domestic subsidies. However, the potential elimination of energy subsidies in Russia carries the risk of social unrest that makes Russian authorities reluctant to remove them.

=== Saudi Arabia ===
Most energy subsidies in Saudi Arabia are implicit in nature. This is due to the fact domestic oil prices are generally below global market prices but above domestic production costs, leading to forgone revenue but not direct subsidy costs. Contrary to the estimates above, a recent paper posits that the incremental electricity subsidy in Saudi Arabia has been eliminated as a result of the 2018 domestic energy price reforms.

=== Turkey ===
In the 21st century, Turkey's fossil fuel subsidies are around 0.2% of GDP, including at least US$14 billion (US$169 per person) between January 2020 and September 2021. If unpaid damages (such as health damage from air pollution) are included road fuel subsidy is estimated at over 400 dollars per person per year and for all fossil fuels over one thousand dollars. Data on finance for fossil fuels by state-owned banks and export credit agencies is not public. The energy minister Fatih Dönmez supports coal and most energy subsidies are for coal, which the OECD has strongly criticised. Capacity mechanism payments to coal-fired power stations in Turkey in 2019 totalled ₺720 million (US$130 million) compared to ₺542 million (US$96 million) to gas-fired power stations in Turkey. In 2022 these payments totalled over US$200 million. As of 2020, the tax per unit energy on gasoline was higher than diesel, despite diesel cars on average emitting more lung damaging NOx (nitrogen oxide).

=== United States ===
Estimates vary considerably. The Cato Institute says that fossil fuel subsidies are negligible, but the Center for American Progress says direct subsidies are $29 billion a year. Because the value of a statistical life is assumed to be zero the health impact of burning coal and health damage from oil products via air pollution in the United States are not estimated. As of 2026 the Environmental Protection Agency is developing guidance to estimate the Value of Mortality Risk.

=== Venezuela ===
As of 2026 gasoline is subsidized.

== See also ==
- Health and environmental impact of the coal industry
- Fossil fuel divestment
- Phase-out of fossil fuel vehicles
