= Hutchinson's rule =

In ecological theory, the Hutchinson's ratio is the ratio of the size differences between similar species when they are living together as compared to when they are isolated. It is named after G. Evelyn Hutchinson who concluded that various key attributes in species varied according to the ratio of 1:1.1 to 1:1.4. The mean ratio 1.3 can be interpreted as the amount of separation necessary to obtain coexistence of species at the same trophic level.

The variation in trophic structures of sympatric congeneric species is presumed to lead to niche differentiation, and allowing coexistence of multiple similar species in the same habitat by the partitioning of food resources. Hutchinson concluded that this size ratio could be used as an indicator of the kind of difference necessary to permit two species to co-occur in different niches but at the same level of the food web. The rule's legitimacy has been questioned, as other categories of objects also exhibit size ratios of roughly 1.3.

Studies done on interspecific competition and niche changes in Tits (Parus spp.) show that when there are multiple species in the same community there is an expected change in foraging when they are of similar size (size ratio 1-1.2). There was no change found among the less similar species. In this paper this was strong evidence for niche differentiation for interspecific competition, and would also be a good argument for Hutchinson's rule.

The simplest and perhaps the most effective way to differentiate the ecological niches of coexisting species is their morphological differentiation (in particular, size differentiation). Hutchinson showed that the average body size ratio in species of the same genus that belong to the same community and use the same resource is about 1.3 (from 1.1 to 1.4) and the respective body weight ratio is 2. This empirical pattern tells us that this rule does not apply to all organisms and ecological situations. And, therefore, it would be of particular interest to study the size differentiation of closely related species in different communities and reveal cases meeting Hutchinson's rule

== Evidence against the Hutchinson's rule ==
M. Eadie. However, presents evidence that Hutchinson's constant is an artifact of the distribution of the size of animate, as well as inanimate, objects in nature. This distribution or ratio would just represent a log-normal distribution and that the variances of these distributions are small. They argue that the size ratio Hutchinson suggests doesn't tell a lot about the actual structuring of animal communities.
