= Grace E. Pickford =

American biologist and endocrinologist

Grace Pickford
- Born: March 24, 1902; Bournemouth, England, UK
- Died: January 20, 1986 (aged 83); Hiram, Ohio, US
- Education: University of Cambridge
- Spouses: G. Evelyn Hutchinson (1926–1933)
- Scientific career
- Fields: Endocrinology, Ichthyology
- Workplaces: Albertus Magnus College; Yale University

Grace Evelyn Pickford (March 24, 1902 – January 20, 1986) was an American biologist and endocrinologist, known for "devising ingenious instruments and techniques" and her work on the hematology and endocrinology of fishes.

== Life and career ==
Pickford was born in Bournemouth, England, in 1902. She studied at Newnham College, Cambridge University, where she was a founding member of the Cambridge University Biological Tea Club. She received the equivalent of a B.A., a "National Sciences Tripos, Pt.I", since Cambridge University did not grant B.A.s to women at that time. She then traveled to South Africa, collecting and studying earth worms (oligochaetes). In 1931 she earned her Ph.D. at Yale under Alexander Petrunkevitch based on studies of her South African oligochaete worm collections.

Pickford joined the Bingham Oceanographic Laboratory at Yale in 1931, where she worked for the next forty years. She taught at the assistant professor level from 1934 to 1959, when she was promoted to associate professor, and finally made a full professor of biology at Yale in 1969, retiring shortly thereafter in 1970. Pickford also taught at the women's college Albertus Magnus, hired by Marcella Boveri.

Pickford was a member of various research expeditions, including the 1951 Danish Galathea expedition, and carried out research in a wide variety of organisms.

She is perhaps best known for her foundational work in the field of comparative endocrinology. She did extensive studies of the pituitary hormone prolactin, discovering that in killifish prolactin is required to maintain osmotic balance in fresh water; this work was the underpinnings for most research on prolactin in vertebrates. Pickford's 1957 monograph on the topic, "The Physiology of the Pituitary Gland of Fishes", is "considered an early and still enormously useful classic" in the field of comparative endocrinology, the "bible for scientists on the endocrinology of lower vertebrates." In the course of this work Pickford developed a number of important techniques still used today in endocrine studies.

Similarly, she showed that Latimeria, like sharks, uses urea to regulate the osmotic pressure of its blood. On the 1951 Galatea expedition to the Indo-Malay region, she completed a study of Vampyroteuthis, a deep sea cephalopod that resembles both an octopus and a squid, developing "ingenious" technologies to handle the technical problems of studying in deep seas. Her large collection of water beetles is today stored at Yale's Peabody Museum of Natural History.

Pickford was married from 1926 to 1933 to fellow biologist George Evelyn Hutchinson.

== Notable papers ==
- GE Pickford and JW Atz, "The Physiology of the Pituitary Gland of Fishes" (New York Zoological Society 1957)
- FH Epstein, AI Katz, GE Pickford, "Sodium-and potassium-activated adenosine triphosphatase of gills: role in adaptation of teleosts to salt water", Science, 1967
- GE Pickford, JG Phillip, "Prolactin, a factor in promoting survival of hypophysectomized killifish in fresh water", Science (1959)
- Grace E. Pickford, A Monograph of the Acanthodriline Earthworms of South Africa, Cambridge, England: Heffner and Sons, 1937. (Pickford's dissertation.)
- Grace E. Pickford, Studies on the Digestive Enzymes of Spiders. New Haven, Conn.: Connecticut Academy of Arts and Sciences, 1942.
- Pickford and Bayard H. McConnaughey. The Octopus bimaculatus Problem: A Study in Sibling Species. New Haven, Conn.: Peabody Museum of Natural History, 1949.

== Awards ==
- Distinguished Scientist in Residence, Hiram College
- Wilbur Cross Medal (Yale), 1981
- The Grace Pickford Medal in Comparative Endocrinology, given by the International Federation of Comparative Endocrinology Societies (IFCES) in her honour, was established in 1980. It is "the highest honour" in comparative endocrinology.
