= G. Evelyn Hutchinson =

British ecologist (1903–1991)

G. Evelyn Hutchinson ForMemRS
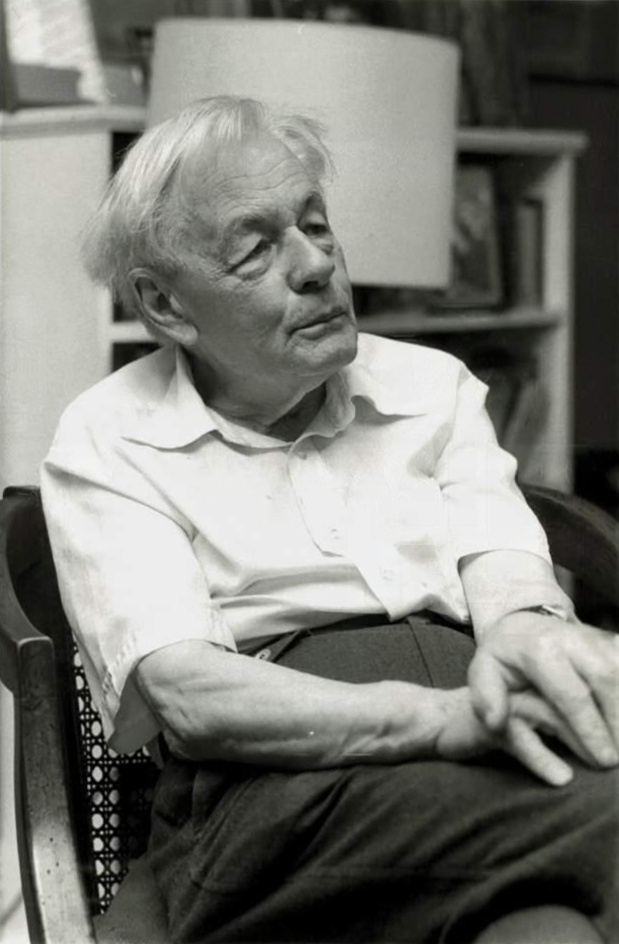
- Hutchinson in 1984
- Born: George Evelyn Hutchinson; 30 January 1903; Cambridge, England
- Died: 17 May 1991 (aged 88); London, England
- Education: Gresham's School; Emmanuel College, Cambridge
- Known for: Founder of American limnology; creating the concept of multi-dimensional ecological niche
- Spouses: Grace Pickford (m. 1931; div. 1933) Margaret Seal (m. 1933; died 1983) Anne Twitty
- Awards: Leidy Award (1952); Tyler Prize (1974); Franklin Medal (1979); Daniel Giraud Elliot Medal (1984); Kyoto Prize (1986); National Medal of Science (1991)
- Scientific career
- Fields: Limnology, ecology
- Workplaces: Yale University
- Doctoral students: Edward Smith Deevey Jr.; Donna Haraway; Robert H. MacArthur; Gordon Arthur Riley; Lawrence B. Slobodkin; Howard T. Odum
- Author abbrev. (botany): G.E.Hutch.

George Evelyn Hutchinson (30 January 1903 – 17 May 1991) was a British ecologist sometimes described as the "father of modern ecology." He contributed for more than sixty years to the fields of limnology, systems ecology, radiation ecology, entomology, genetics, biogeochemistry, a mathematical theory of population growth, art history, philosophy, religion, and anthropology. He worked on the passage of phosphorus through lakes, the chemistry and biology of lakes, the theory of interspecific competition, and on insect taxonomy and genetics, zoo-geography, and African water bugs. He is known as one of the first to combine ecology with mathematics. He became an international expert on lakes and wrote the four-volume Treatise on Limnology in 1957.

Hutchinson earned his degree in zoology from Cambridge University but chose not to earn a doctorate, of which he came to be proud as he aged. Although born in England, he spent nearly his entire professional life at Yale University in the United States where he was Sterling Professor of Zoology and focused on working with graduate students.

== Early life and education ==
Hutchinson was born in 1903 to Arthur and Evaline D. Hutchinson. He grew up in Cambridge, England. His father was a mineralogist at the University of Cambridge. Hutchinson grew up surrounded by intellectuals, including two of Darwin's sons. By the age of five, Hutchinson was already collecting aquatic creatures and studying their preferred living environment in aquariums that he manufactured himself. He had a younger brother and a younger sister. He had his early education at Saint Faith's. He went on in 1917 to study at Gresham's School in Norfolk. Gresham's was unique in not focusing on the classics, but including more intensive studies of mathematics and science, along with modern languages and history. It was here that he began to notice that organisms had different chemical environments. Hutchinson was admitted to read zoology at Emmanuel College, Cambridge, graduating in 1925.

== Personal life ==
Hutchinson married three times. His first wife was Grace Pickford. Grace was also Cambridge educated, she became a well known scientist as well. They were married from 1931 to 1933, when they agreed to a divorce. He met his second wife, Margaret Seal, while on a boat returning to England from India. She was a musician and they shared an appreciation for music, literature, and art. They were married for fifty years, with no children. She died of Alzheimer's in 1983. Hutchinson's third marriage occurred while he was into his eighties to Anne Twitty, a biologist of Haitian descent. He survived all three of his wives and died in London, May 17, 1991.

== Beginning of professional career ==
After graduating, he went to Italy to study octopuses. Next he travelled to South Africa where he discovered the field of limnology or the study of freshwater systems, on the shallow lakes near Cape Town. He took a position teaching zoology at Yale University in 1928. He travelled widely, reaching underexplored parts of the world and writing his first book on the ecology of high-elevation lakes in India. At Yale his graduate students influenced him to research new areas.

== Research ==
=== Italy ===
At the age of twenty-two, on graduating from Cambridge, Hutchinson traveled to Italy on a Rockefeller Higher Education Fellowship to work at the Stazione Zoologica. He was interested in doing research on the branchial gland of the octopus. He wanted to establish endocrine function in higher invertebrates. He thought that the branchial gland was the endocrine gland in the octopus, but an octopus shortage put an end to his research. He returned to Italy many times for Italian art, folklore, and to study his Italian ancestry.

=== South Africa ===
In 1926 he applied for a lectureship at the University of Witwatersrand in Johannesburg. He lectured for two years before he was fired, but he continued to study the South African water bugs. When he began his research there were fourteen known species and when he concluded his research there were nearly forty. It was here that Hutchinson discovered limnology, or the study of fresh waters. Along with Grace Pickford, he studied the chemistry and biology of the coastal lakes. He was greatly interested in limnology due to it combining of all his interests such as natural history, aquatic invertebrates, and chemistry. He was drawn to the differences in the chemistry, flora, and fauna in the different water sources. While in South Africa in the late 1920s he frequently visited the southeastern portion of the country, in particular conducting biology and chemistry research in Morgans Bay and St Lucia, he also spent a lot of time around the Sani Pass and the Drakensberg Mountains as well as the area around Royal Natal National Park. He became somewhat of a minor celebrity in Natal during this time.

=== India ===
In 1932 Hutchinson joined the Yale North India Expedition. He wanted to be the first to make ecological observations of a high-altitude lake, and to compare these with lower-altitude lakes. The work yielded insights into biogeography and new data on high elevation limnology. Most lakes had no fish, and crustaceans were the top predators. In letters to his wife, he described the different water chemistry from the Indian lakes to the South African lakes. He collected hundreds of specimens for analysis by specialists. This expedition provided the material for his first book, The Clear Mirror, in which he described the colors, organisms, ecology, and the people of the Ladakh.

=== Limnology and trophic dynamic energy flow ===
Most of Hutchinson's contributions to American limnology came from research at Linsley Pond in Connecticut. Studies were done on small lakes, such as chemical stratification, oxygen deficits, productivity, and the ecological significance of the oxidation-reduction potential of lake waters. His four volume Treatise on Limnology became a standard for limnology students. Hutchinson expanded the field of limnology, especially in its ecological and biogeochemical aspects. He advocated the use of statistical and mathematical methods in limnology. His postdoctoral associate Raymond Lindeman furthered Hutchinson's model of the trophic dynamic concept. Together they looked at energy flows through the lake in the trophic levels of ecosystems. They followed the energy using Hutchinson's notation system in which each organism was given an integer to mark how many organisms the energy had to go through in order to reach it, this was designated as its trophic level. It then became possible to measure the efficiency of a given system, or the energy losses between ascending trophic levels.

=== Radioisotopes ===
Hutchinson is also recognized as being the first to use radioisotopes as tracers in field experiments. In doing so he along with his graduate student Vaughan Bowen, are credited with creating Radiation Ecology, a brand new major field of ecology. He again turned to Linsley Pond, he released twenty-four portions in two lines and dispersed it uniformly across the water, a week later they collected water across different depths in the lake. They then evaporated and measured the radioactivity, what they found they deemed to be statistically significant. The rest was found to have been taken up by the aquatic plants in the shallow water area of the lake.

=== Ecology ===
Hutchinson and his graduate students intellectualized American ecology by "forcing its practitioners to confront all of the processes that maintain to change ecological systems, whether these processes were biological, physical or geological". He built on Charles Elton's idea of an ecological niche. He defined it as "a highly abstract multi-dimensional hyperspace in which the organism's needs and properties were defined as dimensions." Hutchinson created the idea of "Circular Causal Systems", the tight link between biological and physical processes, and that the activity of organisms balanced the effects on the cycles of chemicals through organisms. He said that the changes in biological productivity were related to the changes of available nutrients. He stated that the condition in which organisms existed were systems of feedback loops. In his systems view, there were both living and non-living feedback systems which followed the same mechanical principles. This led to the development of systems ecology by his student H.T. Odum.

== Legacy ==
Due to Hutchinson, the European attitudes towards ecology entered America. Before Hutchinson, ecology and natural history were considered identical. After Hutchinson it became legitimate to study the physical and chemical properties of ecosystems in their own right. Hutchinson also raised the idea of climate change 30 years before the problem became popular. He taught his students as early as 1947 that the increase in atmospheric carbon dioxide would lead to a global temperature increase. He considered the causes and preventatives for extinction, resource management, and the social anthropology of endangered cultures decades before they were attracting attention as crises. He influenced many different areas of ecology, contributing to his designation as the "Father of Modern Ecology". His many graduate students went on to careers in ecology. He was the first to describe and resolve the paradox of the plankton in 1961. Upon his death, Yvette H. Edmondson noted "The era that ended with G.E. Hutchinson's death was not only that of a thoughtful man and the growth of a science imprinted by his thinking. Even more sadly, we may be seeing the end of an intellectual climate in which the sparking mind of one individual can so illuminate a science. Science by committee casts a very different light." In 1982, the American Society of Limnology and Oceanography, now called the Association for the Sciences of Limnology and Oceanography, honored Hutchinson by creating the G. Evelyn Hutchinson Award, one of the Society's major awards that is given annually to recognize excellence in any aspect of limnology or oceanography.

== Awards ==
Hutchinson was elected to the American Academy of Arts and Sciences in 1949, the National Academy of Sciences in 1950, and the American Philosophical Society in 1956. He was awarded the 1952 Leidy Award from the Academy of Natural Sciences of Philadelphia. He was awarded the Daniel Giraud Elliot Medal from the National Academy of Sciences in 1984. He was elected to the Royal Society in 1983, awarded the Kyoto Prize in 1986, and posthumously the National Medal of Science in 1991.

== Publications ==
- The Clear Mirror (1936)
- The Itinerant Ivory Tower (1953)
- A Preliminary List of the Writings of Rebecca West, 1912–51 (1957)
- A Treatise on Limnology (1957, 1967, 1975, 1993)

Vol. I Geography, Physics and Chemistry (1957)
Vol. II Introduction to Lake Biology and the Limnoplankton (1967)
Vol. III Limnological Botany (1975)
Vol. IV The Zoobenthos (1993)

- The Enchanted Voyage (1962)
- The Ecological Theater and the Evolutionary Play (1965)
- An Introduction to Population Ecology (1978)
- The Kindly Fruits of the Earth: Recollections of an Embryo Ecologist (1979)

== See also ==
- Hutchinson's ratio
- Hutchinson's rule

== Notes ==
=== References ===
- Slack, Nancy G. (2011). G. Evelyn Hutchinson and the Invention of Modern Ecology. New Haven: Yale University Press.
