= Hutchinson's ratio =

In ecological theory, the Hutchinson's ratio is the ratio of the size differences between similar species when they are living together as compared to when they are isolated. It is named after G. Evelyn Hutchinson who concluded that various key attributes in species varied according to the ratio of 1:1.1 to 1:1.4. Hutchinson concluded that the mean ratio, 1.3, can be understood as the variation of attribute separation needed in order to preserve species coexistence at the same trophic level but in differing niches.

However, some authors present evidence that this ratio does not depict the structure of animal communities. Rather, Hutchinson's ratio is just a representation of the distribution of entities, both living and non-living, in nature. A study was conducted by R. Charles MacNally to test whether sympatric species form geometric series, also known as a Hutchinsonian series. The results of this revealed that only a small fraction of the series conformed to the expected ratio of 1.3, questioning the accuracy of Hutchinson's ratio.

== See also ==
- Hutchinson's rule
