= Limnology and Oceanography: Methods =

Monthly peer-reviewed journal

- Subject: Limnology Oceanography
- Language: English
- Edited by: Paul Kemp

Publication details
- History: 2003–present
- Publisher: Wiley for the Association for the Sciences of Limnology and Oceanography
- Frequency: Monthly
- Impact factor: 2.634 (2020)

Standard abbreviations
- ISO 4: Limnol. Oceanogr. Methods

Indexing
- ISSN: 1541-5856

Links
- Journal homepage

Limnology and Oceanography: Methods (L&O Methods) is a monthly peer-reviewed scientific journal focused on methodological aspects of the aquatic sciences, such as new measurement equipment and techniques or evaluations and comparisons of existing methods. It was established in 2003 and originally published through the Association for the Sciences of Limnology and Oceanography (ASLO), and now published in partnership with John Wiley and Sons. Occasionally, L&O Methods publishes special issues focused on a specific topic in aquatic systems in addition to the twelve regular issues published each year.

== List of editors ==
- Paul F. Kemp (2003– )
