= Limnology and Oceanography Letters =

Bimonthly peer-reviewed journal

- Subject: Limnology Oceanography
- Language: English
- Edited by: Jim Cloern

Publication details
- History: 2016–present
- Publisher: Wiley
- Frequency: Bimonthly
- Impact factor: 8.507 (2021)

Standard abbreviations
- ISO 4: Limnol. Oceanogr. Lett.

Indexing
- ISSN: 2378-2242

Links
- Journal homepage

Limnology and Oceanography Letters (L&O Letters) is a bimonthly, online open access, and peer-reviewed scientific journal focused on publishing innovative and trend-setting studies in all aspects of limnology and oceanography. It was established in 2016 and publishes four types of articles; Letters, Essays, Current Evidence, and Data Articles. L&O Letters is published through the Association for the Sciences of Limnology and Oceanography in partnership with John Wiley and Sons. Occasionally, L&O Letters publishes special issues focused on a specific topic in aquatic systems in addition to the six regular issues published each year.

== List of editors ==
- Patricia A. Soranno (2016–2019)
- James E. Cloern (2019–present)
