= Limnology and Oceanography Bulletin =

Quarterly scientific journal

- Subject: Limnology Oceanography
- Language: English
- Edited by: Laura Falkenberg

Publication details
- History: 1990–present
- Publisher: Wiley
- Frequency: Monthly

Standard abbreviations
- ISO 4: Limnol. Oceanogr. Bull.

Indexing
- ISSN: 1539-6088

Links
- Journal homepage

Limnology and Oceanography Bulletin (L&O Bulletin) is a quarterly scientific journal that publishes a mixture of peer-reviewed and non-peer-reviewed articles, letters, and society news for members of the Association for the Sciences of Limnology and Oceanography (ASLO). L&O Bulletin publishes a variety of formats including articles, viewpoints, community news, meeting highlights, and book reviews and serves as a forum for the ASLO community to share advances and news in aquatic science fields related to scientific advancements, education, policy, among other topics. It was established in 1990 as the ASLO Bulletin published through ASLO. In 2001, it became the Limnology and Oceanography Bulletin, and is now published in partnership with John Wiley and Sons.

== List of editors ==
- C. Susan Weiler (1991–1999)
- Jonathan Phinney (2000–2001)
- Greg Cutter (2001–2007)
- John Dolan, co-Editor (2007–2015)
- Chris Filstrup, Deputy Editor (2015–2020 )
- Adrienne Sponberg (2007–2020 )
- Chris Filstrup, Interim Editor (2020–2021 )
- Laura Falkenberg, Editor (2022–)
