= International Institute for Sustainable Development =

Think tank in Canada and Switzerland

- Abbreviation: IISD
- Formation: 1990
- Type: NGO
- Legal status: Registered charitable organization
- Purpose: Sustainable development
- Headquarters: 111 Lombard Ave #325, Winnipeg, MB R3B 0W7, Canada
- President & CEO: Patricia Fuller
- Chair of the Board: Michelle Edkins
- Main organ: Executive Leadership Team
- Budget: CAN $43 million (FY 2022/23)
- Website: www.iisd.org

The International Institute for Sustainable Development (IISD) is an independent think tank founded in 1990 working to shape and inform international policy on sustainable development governance. The institute has three offices in Canada - Winnipeg, Ottawa, and Toronto, and one office in Geneva, Switzerland. It has over 150 staff and associates working in over 30 countries.

IISD is a registered charitable organization in Canada.

== History and organization ==
In 1988 at the United Nations General Assembly, then-Canadian Prime Minister Brian Mulroney announced plans to "establish a centre which will promote internationally the concept of environmentally sustainable development", to be headquartered in Winnipeg. The new centre would be part of Canada's contribution to preparations for what became the United Nations Conference on Environment and Development (UNCED), also known as the Rio Earth Summit. Two years later in 1990, IISD was formally set up, following the signature of an agreement between then-Canadian Environment Minister Lucien Bouchard and Manitoba Premier Gary Filmon.

In 1992, IISD became the home of Earth Negotiations Bulletin, a news reporting service on global environmental and development negotiations. In 2016, IISD launched the SDG Knowledge Hub, a dedicated site providing news updates, commentary, analysis, calendars, and guest articles on the implementation of the Sustainable Development Goals.

As of 2022, the Institute's daily work is currently structured around the CREATE framework, which will guide its work through 2025. This framework's pillars are Climate, Resources, Economies, Act Together, and Engage. These pillars are put into practice through IISD's five programs: Economic Law and Policy, Energy, Resilience, Tracking Progress, and Water.

Over the past decade, IISD has expanded its programmatic work to include serving as the secretariat of several intergovernmental forums, networks, and alliances. These include the Intergovernmental Forum (IGF) on Mining, Minerals, Metals, and Sustainable Development and the National Adaptation Plan (NAP) Global Network. IISD manages the Secretariat International Support Office (SISO) for the China Council for International Cooperation on Environment and Development (CCICED). On November 11, 2021, IISD announced that it would be the first permanent secretariat of the Beyond Oil and Gas Alliance (BOGA).

IISD has a 15-member board, chaired by Michelle Edkins, Managing Director at BlackRock. IISD's founding board chair is Lloyd McGinnis. The President and CEO of IISD is Patricia Fuller (2024–present), who was formerly Canada’s Ambassador for Climate Change.

== Work ==
IISD's vision is of "a world where people and the planet thrive". The Institute works with intergovernmental organizations, governments, academic institutions, the private sector, and civil society organizations around the world. This collaboration includes developing new research, conducting news reporting and analysis, providing technical assistance and capacity-building support, and convening workshops and other knowledge-sharing events.

To achieve that vision, IISD has structured its work around a framework called CREATE, which underpins the organization's current strategic plan through 2025. The pillars of CREATE are Climate, Resources, Economies, Act Together, and Engage.

=== Climate ===
IISD's Climate work addresses two overarching pillars: climate change mitigation and climate change adaptation.

The work on climate change mitigation is undertaken primarily by IISD's Energy program, which helps governments as they embark on energy policy reforms towards achieving a just transition to net-zero economies by 2050, including through the increased uptake of renewable energy sources and the phase-out of fossil fuel subsidies.

IISD's Energy program is also home to the Global Subsidies Initiative, which provides data, research, and insights into reforming fossil fuel subsidies and fisheries subsidies. As part of IISD's work under its Climate pillar, IISD will serve as the first permanent secretariat of the Beyond Oil and Gas Alliance (BOGA). This initiative was announced by a dozen national and sub-national governments at the United Nations Climate Conference in Glasgow in November 2021 and has the objective of phasing out oil and gas production.

The work on climate change adaptation is undertaken by IISD's Resilience program, which works on advising policymakers on how to improve their countries’ resilience to climate-related risks and adapt to climate change impacts. The Resilience program also works on environment, conflict, and peacebuilding; how the arts can support effective climate adaptation action; and how governments can address climate change mitigation and adaptation in tandem, rather than separately. Through the Resilience program, IISD is the secretariat of the NAP Global Network.

=== Resources ===
IISD's Resources work covers three main areas: the economic sectors of mining and agriculture, which also fall under the Economies' pillar of CREATE, and freshwater health.

IISD's work on agriculture is organized around responsible agricultural investment and trade. Among other projects, IISD is one of the partners supporting the Economic Community of West African States (ECOWAS) Network of Parliamentarians on Gender Equality and Investments in Agriculture and Food Security, together with Oxfam, the Food and Agriculture Organization of the United Nations (FAO), and Women in Law & Development in Africa (WiLDAF). IISD has also partnered with the International Food Policy Research Institute (IFPRI) and Cornell University on research to determine the costs of ending hunger sustainably by 2030 and the policy interventions that could support meeting that objective, in line with Sustainable Development Goal 2. In addition, IISD's agriculture team advises governments on laws, contracts, policies, and legal frameworks for agricultural investment.

IISD's work on mining, in addition to its role as the host of the IGF secretariat, includes research, analysis, and training on tax base erosion and profit shifting (BEPS) and what it means for resource-rich developing countries and their tax revenues from the mining sector. Among other areas, this work covers the recent agreement for a global minimum tax, looking at its overall and sector-specific impacts for developing countries.

IISD's work on freshwater takes place under its Water program, which undertakes scientific research and policy outreach on how to improve the health of our global freshwater supplies. Through its Water program, IISD is the home of the IISD Experimental Lakes Area, based in Kenora, Ontario. Since 2020, IISD has partnered with the African Center for Aquatic Research and Education to look at how to address environmental challenges affecting the African Great Lakes.

=== Economies ===
IISD's Economies work seeks to provide policymakers and others involved in the policy process with the research, analysis, news reporting, and training to help them craft laws, policies, and frameworks for fair, sustainable economies. The topics that IISD's Economies work covers include trade law and policy, international investment law and policy, international taxation law and policy, and sustainable infrastructure finance and procurement.

Through its work on sustainable infrastructure, IISD is now the home of the Nature-Based Infrastructure Global Resource Centre, established in 2021 jointly with the Global Environment Facility, the MAVA Foundation, and the United Nations Industrial Development Organization (UNIDO).

=== Act Together and Engage ===
The Act Together and Engage pillars cut across IISD's various programs of work and are also the primary focus of IISD's Tracking Progress team. Tracking Progress works on supporting communities, domestic policymakers, and international decision-makers in their efforts towards the achievement of the Sustainable Development Goals. The Tracking Progress program undertakes research on global environmental governance and is the home of IISD's Reporting Services work, including Earth Negotiations Bulletin and the SDG Knowledge Hub. The program also works with communities on establishing “Tracking-Progress” sites to monitor their advances towards fulfilling sustainability targets, linked to indicators for assessing community wellbeing.

Through the Tracking Progress program, IISD is the co-convener of the Geneva 2030 Ecosystem, together with the SDG Lab led by UN Geneva[xv] (the United Nations Office at Geneva). The Geneva 2030 Ecosystem works to establish partnerships and encourage joint research and outreach among different organizations in Geneva working on the Sustainable Development Goals.

IISD is also a member of several international networks working on environmental issues. Its European office is part of the Geneva Environment Network and Think Sustainable Europe.

== Flagship Initiatives ==
=== IISD Experimental Lakes Area ===
IISD Experimental Lakes Area (IISD-ELA) is a natural laboratory consisting of 58 small lakes and their watersheds set aside for scientific research. By manipulating these small lakes, scientists are able to examine how all aspects of the ecosystem—from the atmosphere to fish populations—respond. Findings from these real-world experiments are often much more accurate than those from research conducted at smaller scales, such as in laboratories. These findings are used to inform policy outreach and are regularly published in top-tier science journals, including Nature. Opened in 1968, the Experimental Lakes Area was previously operated by the Canadian federal government. IISD took over operation of the Experimental Lakes Area in 2014 after signing agreements with the Canadian federal government and the government of Ontario. The site was subsequently renamed IISD-ELA.

=== National Adaptation Plan (NAP) Global Network ===
IISD hosts the Secretariat for the NAP Global Network, which was initiated by adaptation policy-makers and practitioners from 11 developing and developed countries in December 2014 during a side event at the United Nations Climate Conference in Lima, Peru.

=== Intergovernmental Forum on Mining, Minerals, Metals and Sustainable Development (IGF) ===
The Intergovernmental Forum on Mining, Minerals, Metals and Sustainable Development emerged as a UN Type II partnership following the 2002 World Summit on Sustainable Development in Johannesburg, South Africa. It was originally established in 2005 by the Canadian and South African governments as the Global Dialogue on Mining/Metals and Sustainable Development. IISD became the host of the IGF Secretariat as of October 2015. The current Director of the IGF is Greg Radford, who was appointed to the post in 2016.

The IGF has over 80 members and holds its Annual General Meeting (AGM) every year to gather government officials and representatives from industry, academia, civil society, non-governmental, and international organizations for several days of sessions focused on mining governance and sustainable development. The AGM is held at the Palais des Nations in Geneva, Switzerland and hosted by the United Nations Conference on Trade and Development (UNCTAD).

=== SDG Knowledge Hub ===
The SDG Knowledge Hub is an online resource center for news and commentary regarding the implementation of the United Nations’ 2030 Agenda for Sustainable Development and the Sustainable Development Goals.

The SDG Knowledge Hub was launched in October 2016 and contains news, original commentary from IISD experts, and guest articles. The SDG Knowledge Hub also provides a calendar of upcoming events related to the 2030 Agenda.

The Hub's coverage of the 2030 Agenda tracks the efforts underway in this area at all levels of governance, from communities to intergovernmental bodies. Its articles examine how this range of actors is pursuing the achievement of the Sustainable Development Goals, along with the challenges they face and the opportunities for collaboration that exist. It also looks to set the stage for the post-2030 discussion.

=== State of Sustainability Initiatives (SSI) ===
The State of Sustainability Initiatives (SSI) provides in-depth research and advisory services to support sustainable production and consumption, with a focus on agricultural commodity sectors. It does this by examining the characteristics and performance of voluntary sustainability standards (VSSs) such as Fairtrade, Rainforest Alliance, and UTZ, with the aim of enhancing their effectiveness as tools for sustainable development.
