= Association for the Sciences of Limnology and Oceanography =

Scientific society

- Nickname: ASLO
- Formation: 1936; 90 years ago
- Members: 4,300 (2014)
- President: Susanne Menden-Deuer
- President-Elect: [[]]
- Treasurer: Michelle McCrackin
- Secretary: Dianne Greenfield
- Board of directors: Kerri Finlay, Maria Gonzales, Elizabeth Harvey, Mina Bizic, Ajit Subramaniam, Amina Pollard, Ilana Berman-Frank
- Website: https://www.aslo.org/
- Formerly called: Limnological Society of America; American Society of Limnology and Oceanography

The Association for the Sciences of Limnology and Oceanography (ASLO), formerly known as the Limnological Society of America and the American Society of Limnology and Oceanography, is a scientific society established in 1936 with the goal of advancing the sciences of limnology and oceanography. With approximately 4,000 members in nearly 60 countries, ASLO is the largest scientific society, worldwide, devoted to either limnology or oceanography or both.

== Journal publications ==
ASLO publishes four scientific journals:

- Limnology and Oceanography
- Limnology and Oceanography Letters
- Limnology and Oceanography: Methods
- Limnology and Oceanography Bulletin
- Limnology and Oceanography: Fluids and Environments

Much of the content of ASLO journals is open access. In addition to occasional small workshops ASLO hosts regularly scheduled major scientific meetings around the world including the Aquatic Science Meetings, the Ocean Science Meetings, and the Summer ASLO Meetings. ASLO presents five annual awards in recognition of professional excellence in the field. Active in outreach and public affairs related to the aquatic sciences and related fields, ASLO has a Public Policy Committee. ASLO is governed by an elected Board of Directors, which includes two student members with full voting privileges. ASLO offers its members many benefits and provides information to the general public and educators as well.

== Awards ==
Association for the Sciences of Limnology and Oceanography gives out the following awards:

- the Raymond L. Lindeman Award for an outstanding paper written by a young aquatic scientist
- the G. Evelyn Hutchinson Award to an outstanding mid-career scientists in limnology or oceanography
- the A.C. Redfield Lifetime Achievement Award to recognize and honor major, long-term achievements in the fields of limnology and oceanography
- the John Martin Award to recognize a paper in aquatic sciences that is judged to have had a high impact on subsequent research in the field
- the Ruth Patrick Award to honor outstanding research in aquatic science, particularly a solution of an environmental problem
- the Ramón Margalef Award for Excellence in Education to recognize outstanding contributions to teaching and mentoring students engaged in the fields of limnology and oceanography.
- the Yentsch-Schindler Award honors an aquatic scientist normally within 12 years of the completion of their terminal degree, for outstanding and balanced contributions to research, science training, and broader societal issues
- the Victoria J. Bertics Memorial Award recognizes ASLO members who could not fulfill their career potential because of early death or disability
- the Tommy and Yvette Edmondson Distinguished Service Award to recognize members who have displayed exceptional efforts that support the professional goals and enhance the stature of ASLO
