= Mulo =

Mulo or MULO may refer to:

- Luis Padrón (1878-1939), Cuban baseball player nicknamed "El Mulo"
- Meer Uitgebreid Lager Onderwijs, a former level of education in the Netherlands, Surinam and the Dutch East Indies
- Memorial Union Labor Organization, a University of Wisconsin-Madison labor union
- Mulo, a non-alcoholic beverage sold by the George Muehlebach Brewing Company during Prohibition
- Mulo, Hato-Builico, a suco in Hato-Builico Administrative Post, Ainaro Municipality, Timor-Leste
- Mulo Lighthouse - see List of lighthouses in Croatia
- Mulo (woreda), a woreda (administrative division) of Ethiopia
- Mulo, spiritual believing in Kurzeme-Latvia about bad luck

== See also ==
- Mullo (disambiguation)
