= Sarah Thankam Mathews =

Indian-American author

- Born: Bangalore, India
- Education: Iowa Writer's Workshop
- Notable work: "All This Could Be Different"
- Website: https://www.smathewss.com/

Sarah Thankam Mathews is an Indian-American novelist. Her debut novel, All This Could Be Different, was a finalist for the 2022 National Book Award for Fiction.

== Early life ==
Mathews was born in Bangalore, India to Malayali parents. She moved with her family to Muscat, Oman where she was raised in a tight-knit Indian enclave.

She moved to the United States with her family when she was 17. She attended college at the University of Wisconsin–Madison, where she served as president of the Wisconsin Union Directorate in 2012–2013. She subsequently attended the Iowa Writers Workshop as a Rona Jaffe Fellow.

== Career ==
Mathews' first novel, All This Could Be Different, was published by Penguin Books in 2022. The novel centers a South Asian queer protagonist who is navigating love, friendship, and career in Milwaukee during the Great Recession and the Obama presidency. The novel was received with critical acclaim and was a finalist for the 2022 National Book Award.

Mathews was also previously a Margins Fellow at the Asian American Writers' Workshop, and her short story, Rubberdust, was selected for The Best American Short Stories of 2020.

== Personal life ==
Mathews lives in Brooklyn and considers Kerala to be her ancestral home.

== Published works ==
- (2022) All This Could Be Different. New York: Viking. ISBN 978-0-593-48912-3
