= Fredric March =

American actor (1897–1975)

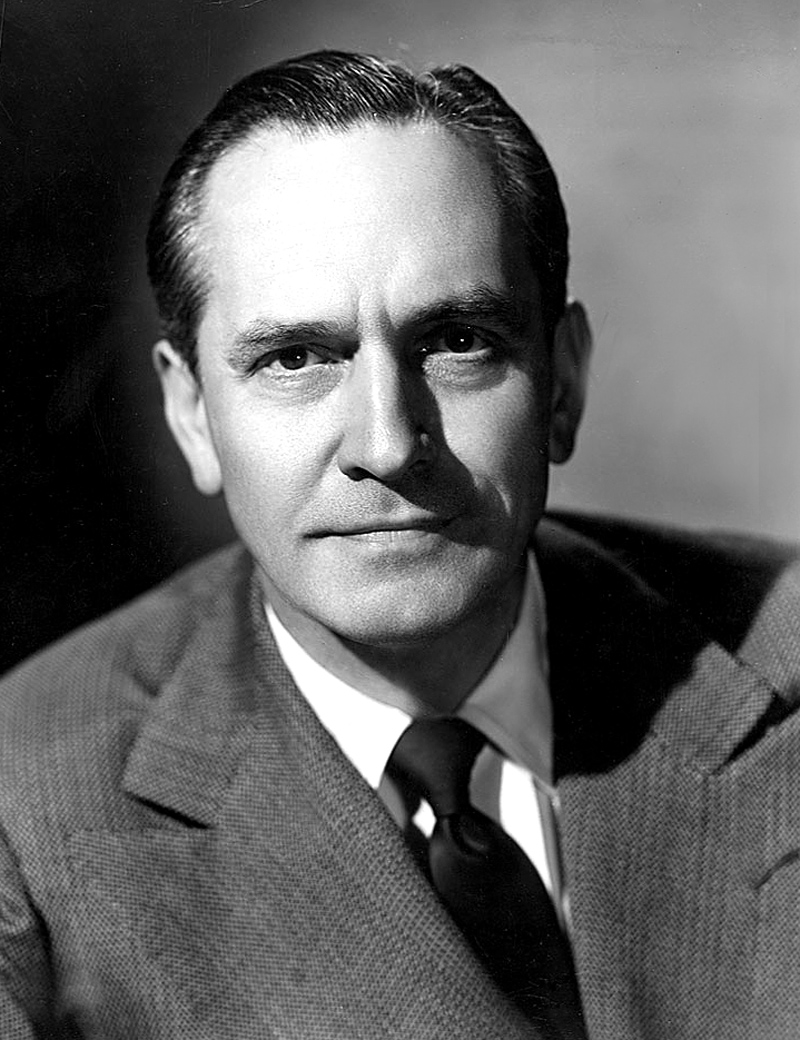
- March in 1940
- Born: Ernest Frederick McIntyre Bickel; August 31, 1897; Racine, Wisconsin, U.S.
- Died: April 14, 1975 (aged 77); Los Angeles, California, U.S.
- Occupation: Actor
- Years active: 1921–1973
- Political party: Democratic
- Spouses: Ellis Baker (m. 1921; div. 1927) Florence Eldridge (m. 1927)
- Children: 2

Fredric March (born Ernest Frederick McIntyre Bickel; August 31, 1897 – April 14, 1975) was an American actor, regarded as one of Hollywood's most celebrated stars of the 1930s and 1940s. As a performer he was known for his versatility. He received numerous accolades including two Academy Awards, a Golden Globe Award, two Tony Awards, two Volpi Cups, the Silver Bear, as well as nominations for three BAFTA Awards and three Emmy Awards.

March began his career in 1920, by working as an extra in movies filmed in New York City. He made his stage debut on Broadway in 1926 at the age of 29, and by the end of the decade, he had signed a film contract with Paramount Pictures. He made seven pictures in 1929. He went on to receive two Academy Awards, for his performances in Dr. Jekyll and Mr. Hyde (1931) and The Best Years of Our Lives (1946). His other Oscar-nominated performances were in the films The Royal Family of Broadway (1930), A Star is Born (1937), and Death of a Salesman (1951).

March gained popularity after establishing himself with leading man roles in films such as Honor Among Lovers (1931), Merrily We Go to Hell (1932), Design for Living (1933), Death Takes a Holiday, The Barretts of Wimpole Street (both 1934), Les Misérables, Anna Karenina, The Dark Angel (all 1935), Anthony Adverse (1936), Nothing Sacred (1937), and I Married a Witch (1942). His later film roles include Executive Suite, The Bridges at Toko-Ri (both 1954), The Desperate Hours (1955), Inherit the Wind (1960), and Seven Days in May (1964). He made his final film appearance in The Iceman Cometh (1973).

March was also known for his stage roles; he made his Broadway debut in the play The Melody Man (1926), and during his stage career he twice won the Tony Award for Best Actor in a Play, for his performances in the Ruth Gordon play Years Ago (1947) and in Eugene O'Neill's Long Day's Journey into Night (1956). He and Helen Hayes are the only actors to have won both the Academy Award and the Tony Award twice.

== Early life ==
March was born in Racine, Wisconsin, the son of Cora Brown Marcher (1863–1936), a schoolteacher from England, and John F. Bickel (1859–1941), a devout Presbyterian Church elder who worked in the wholesale hardware business. March attended the Winslow Elementary School (established in 1855), Racine High School, and the University of Wisconsin–Madison, where he was a member of Alpha Delta Phi.

March served in the United States Army during World War I as an artillery lieutenant.

He began a career as a banker, but an emergency appendectomy caused him to re-evaluate his life and, in 1920, he began working as an "extra" in movies made in New York City, using a shortened form of his mother's maiden name. He appeared on Broadway in 1926, and by the end of the decade, he signed a film contract with Paramount Pictures.

== Career ==
"March's special ability was to suggest genuine mental pain. As a portrayer of tortured and distressed men, he has no equal. The complete physical control which allows him convincingly to sag, stoop and collapse is assisted by a face suggesting at the same time both intelligence and sensitivity"—Australian-born film historian John Baxter.

Like Laurence Olivier, March had a rare protean quality to his acting that allowed him to assume almost any persona convincingly, from Robert Browning to William Jennings Bryan to Dr Jekyll - or Mr. Hyde. He received an Oscar nomination for the 4th Academy Awards in 1930 for The Royal Family of Broadway, in which he played a role modeled on John Barrymore. He won the Academy Award for Best Actor for the 5th Academy Awards in 1932 for Dr. Jekyll and Mr. Hyde (tied with Wallace Beery for The Champ, although March accrued one more vote than Beery). This led to roles in a series of classic films based on stage hits and classic novels like Design for Living (1933) with Gary Cooper and Miriam Hopkins; Death Takes a Holiday (1934); Les Misérables (1935) with Charles Laughton; Anna Karenina (1935) with Greta Garbo; Anthony Adverse (1936) with Olivia de Havilland; and as the original Norman Maine in A Star is Born (1937) with Janet Gaynor, for which he received his third Academy Award nomination.

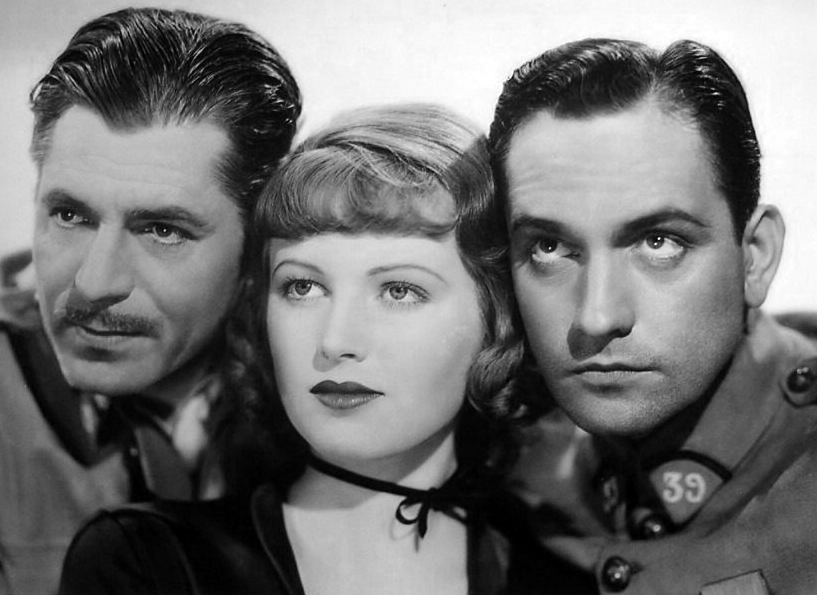
Warner Baxter, June Lang, and March in The Road to Glory (1936)

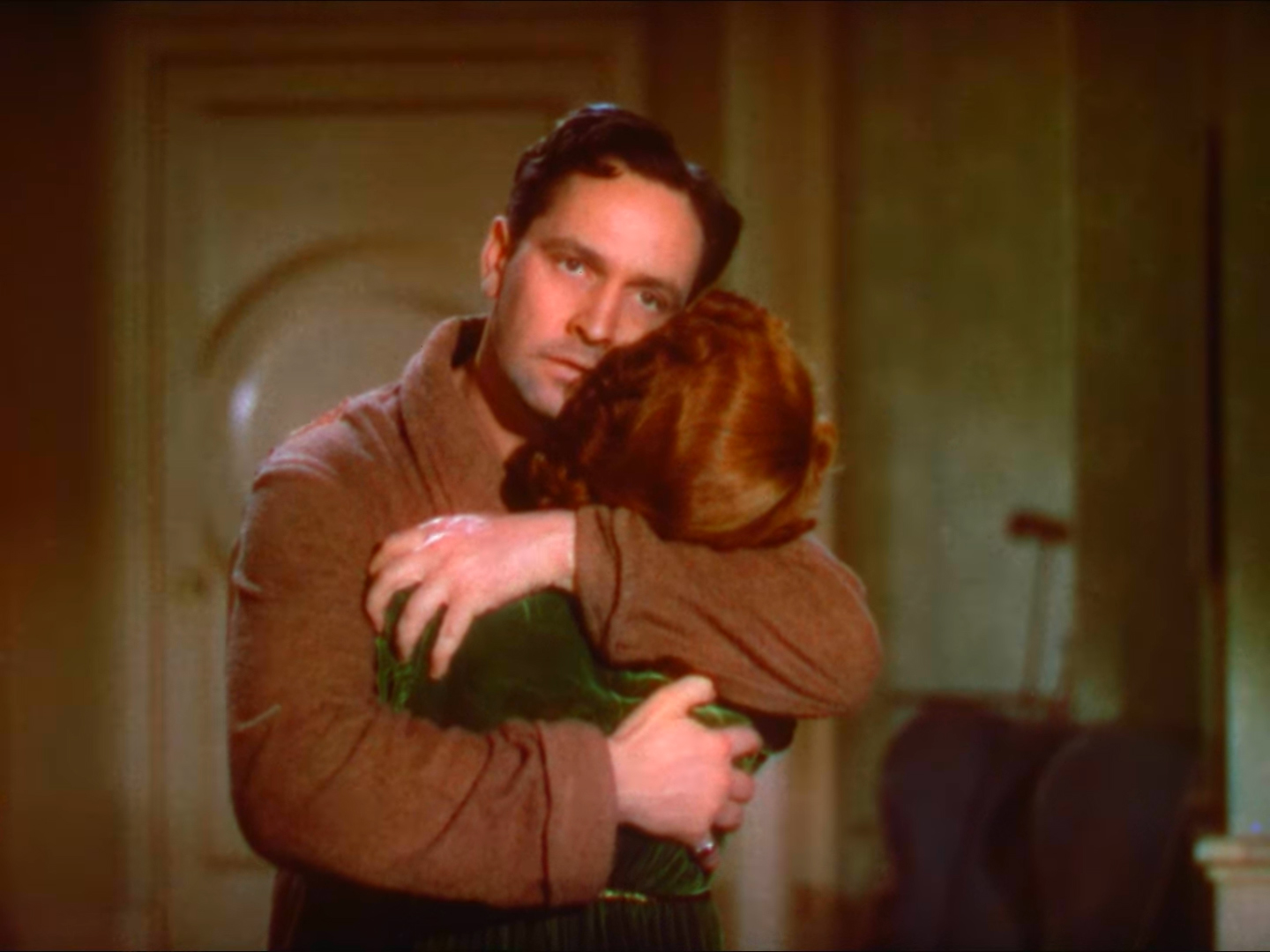
March with Janet Gaynor in A Star is Born (1937)

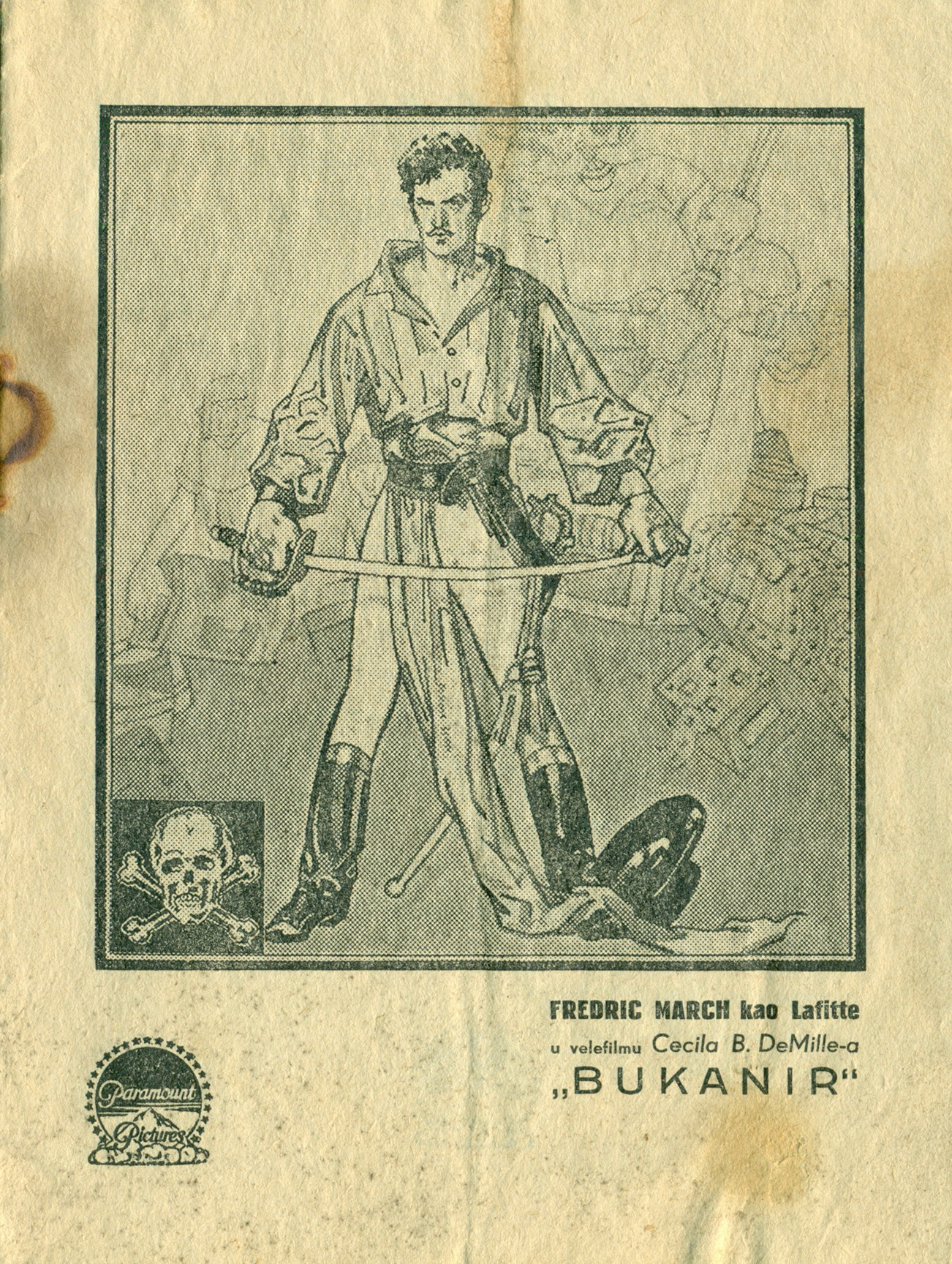
1940, March as Jean Lafitte on an original program for The Buccaneer (1938), playing in a local cinema in Prilep, Macedonia (Kingdom of Yugoslavia)

March resisted signing long-term contracts with the studios, enabling him to play roles in films from a variety of studios. He returned to Broadway after a ten-year absence in 1937 with a notable flop, Yr. Obedient Husband, but after the success of Thornton Wilder's The Skin of Our Teeth, he focused as much on Broadway as on Hollywood. He won two Best Actor Tony Awards: in 1947 for the play Years Ago, written by Ruth Gordon, and in 1957 for his performance as James Tyrone in the original Broadway production of Eugene O'Neill's Long Day's Journey Into Night. He also had major successes in A Bell for Adano in 1944 and Gideon in 1961, and he played in Ibsen's An Enemy of the People on Broadway in 1951. During this period, he also starred in films, including I Married a Witch (1942) and Another Part of the Forest (1948). March won his second Oscar in 1946 for The Best Years of Our Lives.

March also branched out into television, winning Emmy nominations for his third attempt at The Royal Family for the series The Best of Broadway as well as for television performances as Samuel Dodsworth and Ebenezer Scrooge. On March 25, 1954, March co-hosted the 26th Annual Academy Awards ceremony from New York City, with co-host Donald O'Connor in Los Angeles.

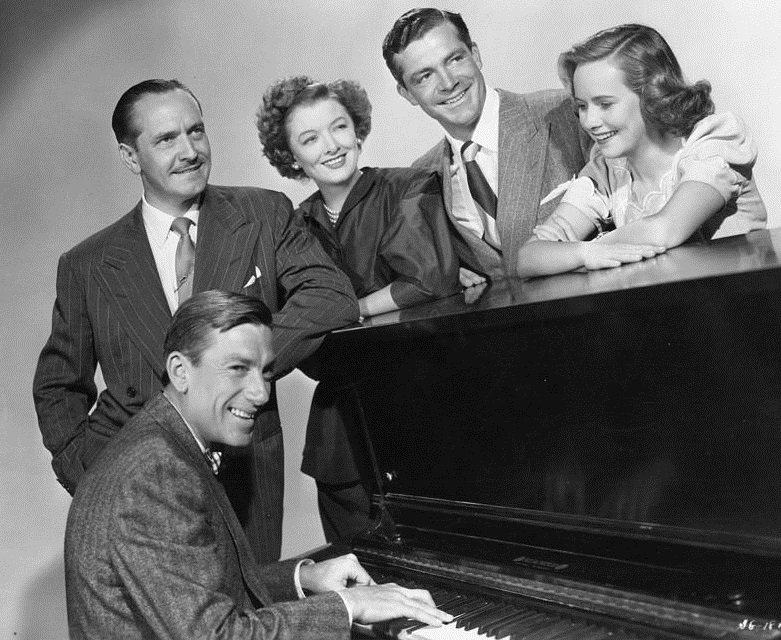
Hoagy Carmichael, March, Myrna Loy, Dana Andrews and Teresa Wright in The Best Years of Our Lives (1946)

March's neighbor in Connecticut, playwright Arthur Miller, was thought to favor March to inaugurate the part of Willy Loman in the Pulitzer Prize–winning Death of a Salesman (1949). However, March read the play and turned down the role, whereupon director Elia Kazan cast Lee J. Cobb as Willy and Arthur Kennedy as one of Willy's sons, Biff Loman. Cobb and Kennedy were two actors with whom the director had worked in the film Boomerang (1947). March later regretted turning down the role and finally played Willy Loman in Columbia Pictures's 1951 film version of the play, directed by Laslo Benedek. March earned his fifth and final Oscar nomination as well as a Golden Globe Award. He also played one of two leads in The Desperate Hours (1955) with Humphrey Bogart. Bogart and Spencer Tracy had both insisted upon top billing, and Tracy withdrew, leaving the part available for March.

In 1957, March was awarded the George Eastman Award, given by George Eastman House for "distinguished contribution to the art of film".

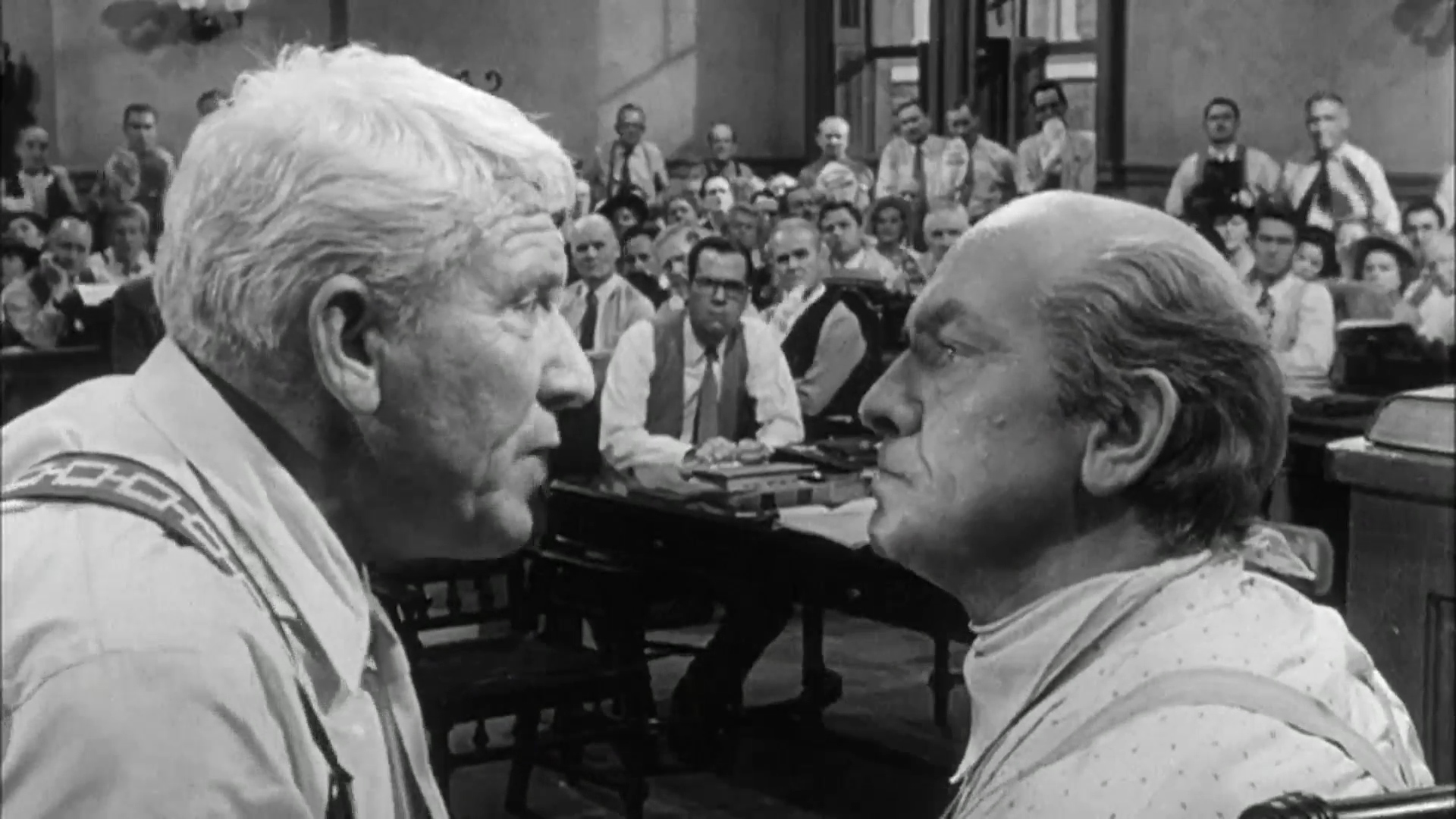
Henry Drummond (Spencer Tracy, left) and Matthew Harrison Brady (March, right) in Inherit the Wind (1960). Previously, March had taken the role in The Desperate Hours (1955) originally offered to Tracy. Both men had also played Dr. Jekyll/Mr. Hyde.

On February 12, 1959, March appeared before a joint session of the 86th United States Congress, reading the Gettysburg Address as part of a commemoration of the 150th anniversary of Abraham Lincoln's birth.

March co-starred with Spencer Tracy in the 1960 Stanley Kramer film Inherit the Wind, in which he played a dramatized version of famous orator and political figure William Jennings Bryan. March's Bible-thumping character provided a rival for Tracy's Clarence Darrow-inspired character. In the 1960s, March's film career continued with a performance as President Jordan Lyman in the political thriller Seven Days in May (1964) in which he co-starred with Burt Lancaster, Kirk Douglas, and Edmond O'Brien; the part earned March a Golden Globe nomination as Best Actor.

March made several spoken word recordings, including a version of Oscar Wilde's The Selfish Giant issued in 1945 in which he narrated and played the title role, and The Sounds of History, a twelve volume LP set accompanying the twelve volume set of books The Life History of the United States, published by Time-Life. The recordings were narrated by Charles Collingwood, with March and his wife Florence Eldridge performing dramatic readings from historical documents and literature.

Following surgery for prostate cancer in 1970, it seemed his career was over; yet, he managed to give one last performance in The Iceman Cometh (1973) as the complicated Irish saloon keeper, Harry Hope.

== Marriage and public activities ==
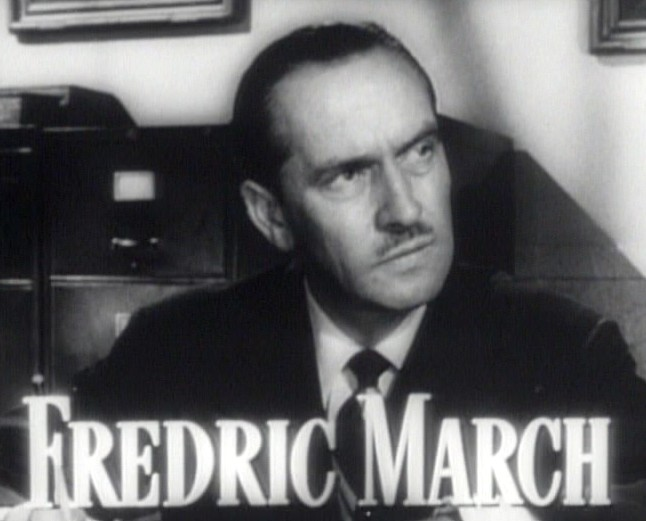
March in 1946

March married actress Ellis Baker during his stint performing in Dayton, Ohio. Baker and March eloped in 1924 but he would divorce her in 1926 after he met Florence Eldridge. The March/Baker marriage ended in 1926.

In 1926, March was the leading man in the summer stock cast at Elitch Theatre, and the leading lady was Florence Eldridge. They fell in love and were married in 1927. They remained married until his death in 1975, and they had two adopted children. They appeared in seven films together, the last being Inherit the Wind.

March and Eldridge commissioned Wallace Neff to build their house in Ridgeview Drive, Bel Air, in 1934. It has subsequently been owned by the philanthropist Wallis Annenberg and the actors Brad Pitt and Jennifer Aniston.

Throughout his life, March and Eldridge were supporters of the Democratic Party. In July 1936, March co-founded the Hollywood Anti-Nazi League (HANL), along with the writers Dorothy Parker and Donald Ogden Stewart, the director Fritz Lang, and the lyricist Oscar Hammerstein.

In 1938, March was one of many Hollywood personalities who were investigated by the House Un-American Activities Committee (HUAC) and the hunt for Communists in the film community. In July 1940, he was among a number of individuals who were questioned by a HUAC subcommittee which was led by Representative Martin Dies Jr.

Later, in 1948, he and his wife sued the anti-communist publication Counterattack for defamation, seeking $250,000 in damages, equal to $3,350,069 today. The suit was settled out of court.

March died of prostate cancer in Los Angeles on April 14, 1975, at the age of 77. He was buried at his estate in New Milford, Connecticut.

== Legacy ==
=== Modern assessment ===
March is regarded as one of the most eminent Hollywood actors of the 1930s and 1940s. Critic and Turner Classic Movies host Ben Mankiewicz opined that "two actors from Hollywood’s golden age really stand in a tier above the rest ... Spencer Tracy and Fredric March". Boston Globe writer Joan Wickersham described March as a Hollywood great who "rejected the Hollywood studio system" and "built a brilliant stage and film career" despite lacking the "instant name recognition" of contemporaries like Humphrey Bogart and Cary Grant. March is also remembered for his later character roles such as those in Inherit the Wind, Seven Days in May, and The Iceman Cometh, roles he played during what was considered a downturn in his film career at the time.

=== Controversy ===
March was briefly a member of an interfraternity society composed of leading students formed at the University of Wisconsin–Madison in 1919 and 1920 named the Ku Klux Klan which is not believed to have been affiliated with the notorious organization of that name. In actuality, March was an outspoken proponent of the civil rights movement for five decades, and worked closely with the NAACP. When the collegiate organization was named, the (later national) KKK was a small regional organization. As the national KKK became better known, the collegiate organization changed its name in 1922.

False rumors based on a misunderstanding of the organization of which March was a member were spread on social media and alleged that March was a white supremacist. The 500-seat theater at the University of Wisconsin–Oshkosh was formerly named after March. The University of Wisconsin–Madison had named the 168-seat at the Memorial Union as the Fredric March Play Circle Theater; however, in 2018, his name was removed, after student protests following reports of March's membership in a student fraternal organization calling itself Ku Klux Klan. UW–Oshkosh pulled March's name from what is now the Theatre Arts Center shortly before the 2020–21 academic term. After new revelations about the nature of the KKK fraternity, as of autumn 2022, there were discussions for a return of March's name.

== Acting credits ==
=== Film ===
Films
Year	Title	Role	Notes
1921	The Education of Elizabeth	Extra	Uncredited; Lost film
1921	The Great Adventure	Extra	Uncredited
1921	The Devil	Extra	Uncredited
1921	Paying the Piper	Extra	Uncredited; Lost film
1929	The Dummy	Trumbull Meredith	
1929	The Wild Party	James 'Gil' Gilmore	
1929	The Studio Murder Mystery	Richard Hardell	
1929	Paris Bound	Jim Hutton	
1929	Jealousy	Pierre	Lost film
1929	Footlights and Fools	Gregory Pyne	Lost film; the soundtrack survives
1929	The Marriage Playground	Martin Boyne	
1930	Sarah and Son	Howard Vanning	
1930	Paramount on Parade	Doughboy	Cameo
1930	Ladies Love Brutes	Dwight Howell	
1930	True to the Navy	Bull's Eye McCoy	
1930	Manslaughter	Dan O'Bannon	
1930	Laughter	Paul Lockridge	
1930	The Royal Family of Broadway	Tony Cavendish	
1931	Honor Among Lovers	Jerry Stafford	
1931	The Night Angel	Rudek Berken	
1931	My Sin	Dick Grady	
1931	Dr. Jekyll and Mr. Hyde	Dr. Henry Jekyll / Mr Edward Hyde	
1932	Strangers in Love	Buddy Drake / Arthur Drake	
1932	Merrily We Go to Hell	Jerry Corbett	
1932	Make Me a Star	Himself	Behind-the-scenes drama, Uncredited
1932	Smilin' Through	Kenneth Wayne	
1932	The Sign of the Cross	Marcus Superbus	
1932	Hollywood on Parade No. A-1	Himself	short film
1933	Tonight Is Ours	Sabien Pastal	
1933	The Eagle and the Hawk	Jerry H. Young	
1933	Design for Living	Thomas B. 'Tom' Chambers	
1934	All of Me	Don Ellis	
1934	Good Dame	Mace Townsley	
1934	Death Takes a Holiday	Prince Sirki / Death	
1934	The Affairs of Cellini	Benvenuto Cellini	
1934	The Barretts of Wimpole Street	Robert Browning	
1934	We Live Again	Prince Dmitri Nekhlyudov	
1934	Hollywood on Parade No. B-6	Himself	short film
1935	Les Misérables	Jean Valjean / Champmathieu	
1935	Anna Karenina	Count Vronsky	
1935	The Dark Angel	Alan Trent	
1935	Screen Snapshots Series 14, No. 11	Himself	short film
1936	The Road to Glory	Lieutenant Michel Denet	
1936	Mary of Scotland	Bothwell	
1936	Anthony Adverse	Anthony Adverse	
1936	Screen Snapshots Series 16, No. 3	Himself	short film
1937	A Star Is Born	Norman Maine	
1937	Nothing Sacred	Wallace 'Wally' Cook	
1937	Screen Snapshots Series 16, No. 5	Himself	short film
1938	The Buccaneer	Jean Lafitte	
1938	There Goes My Heart	Bill Spencer	
1938	Trade Winds	Sam Wye	
1939	The 400 Million	Narrator	Documentary
1940	Susan and God	Barrie Trexel	
1940	Victory	Hendrik Heyst	
1940	Lights Out in Europe	Narrator	Documentary
1941	So Ends Our Night	Josef Steiner	
1941	One Foot in Heaven	William Spence	
1941	Bedtime Story	Lucius 'Luke' Drake	
1942	I Married a Witch	Jonathan Wooley / Nathaniel Wooley / Samuel Wooley	
1942	Lake Carrier	Narrator	Documentary short
1944	Valley of the Tennessee	Narrator	
1944	The Adventures of Mark Twain	Samuel Langhorne Clemens	
1944	Tomorrow, the World!	Mike Frame	
1946	The Best Years of Our Lives	Al Stephenson	
1948	Another Part of the Forest	Marcus Hubbard	
1948	An Act of Murder	Judge Calvin Cooke	
1949	Christopher Columbus	Christopher Columbus	
1950	The Titan: Story of Michelangelo	Narrator	Documentary
1951	It's a Big Country	Joe Esposito	
1951	Death of a Salesman	Willy Loman	
1953	Man on a Tightrope	Karel Cernik	
1954	The Bridges at Toko-Ri	Rear Admiral George Tarrant	
1954	Executive Suite	Loren Phineas Shaw	
1955	The Desperate Hours	Dan C. Hilliard	
1956	Alexander the Great	Philip II of Macedon	
1956	The Man in the Gray Flannel Suit	Ralph Hopkins	
1956	Island of Allah	Narrator	
1957	Albert Schweitzer	Narrator	Documentary
1959	Middle of the Night	Jerry Kingsley	
1960	Inherit the Wind	Matthew Harrison Brady	
1961	The Young Doctors	Dr. Joseph Pearson	
1962	The Condemned of Altona	Albrecht von Gerlach	
1964	Seven Days in May	President Jordan Lyman	
1964	Pieta	Narrator	Documentary
1967	Hombre	Dr. Alex Favor	
1970	...tick...tick...tick...	Mayor Jeff Parks	
1973	The Iceman Cometh	Harry Hope	

=== Television ===
Television
Year	Title	Role	Notes
1949	The Ford Theatre Hour	Oscar Jaffe	Episode: "The Twentieth Century"
1950	The Nash Airflyte Theater		Episode: "The Boor"
1951	Lux Video Theatre		Episode: "The Speech"
1952	Lux Video Theatre	Captain Matt	Episode: "Ferry Crisis at Friday Point"
1952	Toast of the Town	Himself	later known as The Ed Sullivan Show
1953	Omnibus	Don Juan	Episode: "The Last Night of Don Juan"
1954	The Best of Broadway	Tony Cavendish	Episode: "The Royal Family" based on March's Broadway play and film of the same name
1954	Shower of Stars	Ebenezer Scrooge	Episode: "A Christmas Carol"
1954	What's My Line?	Himself	
1956	Producers' Showcase	Sam Dodsworth	Episode: "Dodsworth"
1956	Shower of Stars	Eugene Tesh	Episode: "The Flattering World"
1957	Toast of the Town	Himself	later known as The Ed Sullivan Show
1958	The DuPont Show of the Month	Arthur Winslow	Episode: "The Winslow Boy"
1958	Tales from Dickens	Host	March hosted seven episodes during 1958 and 1959; Episodes: "Bardell Versus Pickwick" "Uriah Heep" "A Christmas Carol" "David and Betsy Trotwood" "David and His Mother" "Christmas at Dingley Dell" "The Runaways"
1963	A Tribute to John F. Kennedy from the Arts	Host	Television special
1964	The Presidency: A Splendid Mystery	Narrator	Television

=== Theater ===
Theatre
Year	Title	Role	Playwright	Venue
1924	The Melody Man	Donald Clemens	Herbert Richard Lorenz	Central Theatre, Broadway
1925	Puppets	Bruno Monte	Francis Lightner	Selwyn Theatre, Broadway
1926	The Half-Caste	Dick Chester	Jack McClellan	National Theatre, Broadway
1926	Devil in the Cheese	Jimmie Chard	Tom Cushing	Charles Hopkins Theatre, Broadway
1938	Your Obedient Husband	Richard Steele	Horace Jackson	Broadhurst Theatre, Broadway
1939	The American Way	Martin Gunther	George S. Kaufman / Moss Hart	Center Theatre, Broadway
1941	Hope for a Harvest	Elliott Martin	Sophie Treadwell	Guild Theatre, Broadway
1942	The Skin of Our Teeth	Mr. Antrobus	Thorton Wilder	Plymouth Theatre, Broadway
1944	A Bell for Adano	Major Victor Joppolo	Paul Osborn	Cort Theatre, Broadway
1946	Years Ago	Clifton Jones	Ruth Gordon	Mansfield Theatre, Broadway
1950	Now Lay Me Down To Sleep	General Leonidas Erosa	Elaine Ryan	Broadhurst Theatre, Broadway
1951	An Enemy of the People	Dr. Thomas Stockman	Henrik Ibsen	Broadhurst Theatre, Broadway
1951	The Autumn Garden	Nicholas Denery	Lillian Hellman	Coronet Theatre, Broadway
1956	Long Day's Journey into Night	James Tyrone	Eugene O'Neill	Helen Hayes Theatre, Broadway
1961	Gideon	Angel	Paddy Chayefsky	Plymouth Theatre, Broadway

=== Radio appearances ===
Year	Program	Episode/source
1942	Lux Radio Theatre	One Foot in Heaven
1946	Academy Award	A Star Is Born
1949	The MGM Theater of the Air	Citadel
1953	Theatre Guild on the Air	Cass Timberlane
1953	Star Playhouse	A Bell for Adano
1953	Star Playhouse	There Shall Be No Night

== Awards and nominations ==
March has a star for motion pictures on the Hollywood Walk of Fame, at 1620 Vine Street.

Award	Year	Category	Work	Result
Academy Awards	1931	Best Actor	The Royal Family of Broadway	Nominated
Academy Awards	1932	Best Actor	Dr. Jekyll and Mr. Hyde	Won
Academy Awards	1938	Best Actor	A Star Is Born	Nominated
Academy Awards	1947	Best Actor	The Best Years of Our Lives	Won
Academy Awards	1952	Best Actor	Death of a Salesman	Nominated
BAFTA Awards	1952	Best Foreign Actor	Death of a Salesman	Nominated
BAFTA Awards	1955	Best Foreign Actor	Executive Suite	Nominated
BAFTA Awards	1961	Best Foreign Actor	Inherit the Wind	Nominated
Golden Globe Awards	1952	Best Actor – Motion Picture Drama	Death of a Salesman	Won
Golden Globe Awards	1960	Best Actor – Motion Picture Drama	Middle of the Night	Nominated
Golden Globe Awards	1965	Best Actor – Motion Picture Drama	Seven Days in May	Nominated
Primetime Emmy Awards	1955	Best Single Performance by an Actor	The Best of Broadway (for episode "The Royal Family")	Nominated
Primetime Emmy Awards	1955	Best Single Performance by an Actor	Shower of Stars (for episode "A Christmas Carol")	Nominated
Primetime Emmy Awards	1957	Best Single Performance by an Actor	Producers' Showcase (for episode "Dodsworth")	Nominated
Tony Awards	1947	Best Actor in a Play	Years Ago	Won
Tony Awards	1957	Best Actor in a Play	Long Day's Journey into Night	Won
Tony Awards	1962	Best Actor in a Play	Gideon	Nominated
Venice Film Festival Awards	1932	Best Actor	Dr. Jekyll and Mr. Hyde	Won
Venice Film Festival Awards	1952	Volpi Cup for Best Actor	Death of a Salesman	Won
Venice Film Festival Awards	1954	Special Jury Prize for Ensemble Acting	Executive Suite	Won (shared with the principal cast)
Berlin Film Festival Awards	1960	Silver Bear for Best Actor	Inherit the Wind	Won
David di Donatello Awards	1964	Best Foreign Actor	Seven Days in May	Won
New York Film Critics Circle Awards	1946	Best Actor	The Best Years of Our Lives	Nominated
Laurel Awards	1967	Top Male Supporting Performance	Hombre	Nominated

== Biographies ==
- Fredric March: Craftsman First, Star Second by Deborah C. Peterson (1996),
- Fredric March: A Consummate Actor (2013) by Charles Tranberg.

== See also ==
- List of actors with two or more Academy Awards in acting categories
