= Memorial Union Labor Organization =

The Memorial Union Labor Organization (MULO) was a labor union of student workers and limited-term employees (LTEs) at the Memorial Union and Union South on the University of Wisconsin-Madison campus.

Founded in 1971, the organization of workers at the Memorial Union was the result of the upsurge of political activity in the 1960s on the UW-Madison campus. Prior to MULO's formation, the teaching assistants at the University of Wisconsin organized a union, the Teaching Assistants Association (TAA), in 1969. Also, the failed union organization of Checker Cab, involving student workers, led to the establishment of the cabdriver cooperative, Union Cab, in 1979.

MULO successfully negotiated collective bargaining agreements from 1971 through 2004, inclusive. These agreements included basic worker protections (just cause, seniority, hours of work, and grievance procedure with arbitration), but did not include provisions considered to be standard in modern labor agreements, such as wages, fringe benefits, and union security provisions beyond dues checkoff. On two occasions, 1972 and 1976, MULO engaged in strikes to support demands for wage negotiations, an issue over which the university steadfastly refused to bargain. Though the strikes did not achieve contract provisions regarding wages, the parties were nonetheless able to reach agreement on contracts.

MULO has through the years been a training ground for left-leaning labor unionists. MULO officers, upon graduating from college, have worked as rank-and-file unionists or as officials in other labor unions. Some have also secured work in the academia, specializing in labor studies.

In 1996, MULO agreed to switch from the two-year contract format to a four-year contract format. This created difficulty in maintaining a leadership and the ability to engage members. Combined with this was an economic boom in Madison which created a significant labor shortage due to a massive drop and forced the minimum wage of The Wisconsin Union to rise dramatically. The demand for workers created many opportunities for student-workers in the city, which further hurt the ability of the labor union to attract members or leaders. Other internal issues created continuity problems and, in 2004, MULO was shut down by the university administration. The administration, reportedly, demanded that MULO present elected officials with which to negotiate. When none came forward, the administration moved to ignore the labor union. MULO has never had a decertification vote.
