= The Sounds of History =

Album by Time-Life Records

The Sounds of History was a 12-volume set of LPs first issued between 1962 and 1964 by Time-Life Records, as a companion to their 12-volume set of books, The Life History of the United States, some of which were written by noted historian Richard B. Morris.

The albums followed a standard format. Side 1 of the LP would always be devoted to brief summaries of historical events, interspersed with dramatic readings by actors Fredric March and Florence Eldridge of historical documents and literary works relevant to whatever was being discussed. The summaries would be read by CBS journalist Charles Collingwood. As the albums progressed toward more modern times, actual recordings of the voices of such politicians as Franklin D. Roosevelt, Dwight D. Eisenhower, Joseph McCarthy, John F. Kennedy, and Richard Nixon were used. The dramatic readings (not the recordings of the politicians) would often be accompanied by music by such composers as Virgil Thomson.

Side 2 of the LP would always be devoted to songs and music from the era being covered. These ranged from Quaker hymns and 18th-century dance music to Broadway show tunes.

The albums were quite distinguished in their day, but today would be regarded as extremely politically incorrect. (One such example was a wildly melodramatic reading by Ms. Eldridge of Tom's death scene from the book Uncle Tom's Cabin, which, back then, had still not quite acquired the rather infamous reputation it has now.) Native Americans were invariably referred to as Indians on the recordings, and African Americans were called Negroes, as was customary then. This is most likely the main reason that the set, which broke off with the inauguration of John F. Kennedy (but did mention his assassination), has never been issued on CD.

The albums and the books were obtainable only through mail order and were shipped on an average of one every two months. Thus, acquiring the complete set would take an average buyer two full years.

The volumes were entitled, respectively:

- The New World
- The Making of a Nation
- The Growing Years
- The Sweep Westward
- The Union Sundered
- The Union Restored
- The Age of Steel and Steam
- Reaching for Empire
- The Progressive Era
- War, Boom and Bust
- New Deal and Global War
- The Great Age of Change.

The books can still be found on websites such as Amazon.com and eBay, but only as used copies.
