= Wisconsin Hoofers =

Recreational club

The Wisconsin Hoofers of the Wisconsin Union is a group of outdoor recreational clubs at the University of Wisconsin–Madison, operated by the Wisconsin Union Directorate.

The emblem of the club in its current form is the capital "W" overlaid by the horseshoe (which looks like "U", thus alluding to the "U of W").

== History ==
The Wisconsin Hoofers was begun in 1920 by a group of Norwegian exchange students who built a ski jump on the UW-Madison campus by Lake Mendota. The club was originally called the Badger Ski Club. Porter Butts, the first director of the Memorial Union, was instrumental in establishing the Wisconsin Hoofers. The first Hoofers club, a skiing and outing club, was established in 1931, modeled after the Dartmouth Outing Club. The name "hoofers" is similar to the term "heelers" used for the new members of the Dartmouth club and reportedly was designed to imply "getting there under your own power." In 1976 Hoofers listed over 5,600 members.

From 2012 to 2017, Memorial Union underwent extensive renovations. Wisconsin Hoofers was renovated during the first phase of the project, which lasted from 2012 to 2013.

== Hoofer Sailing Club ==
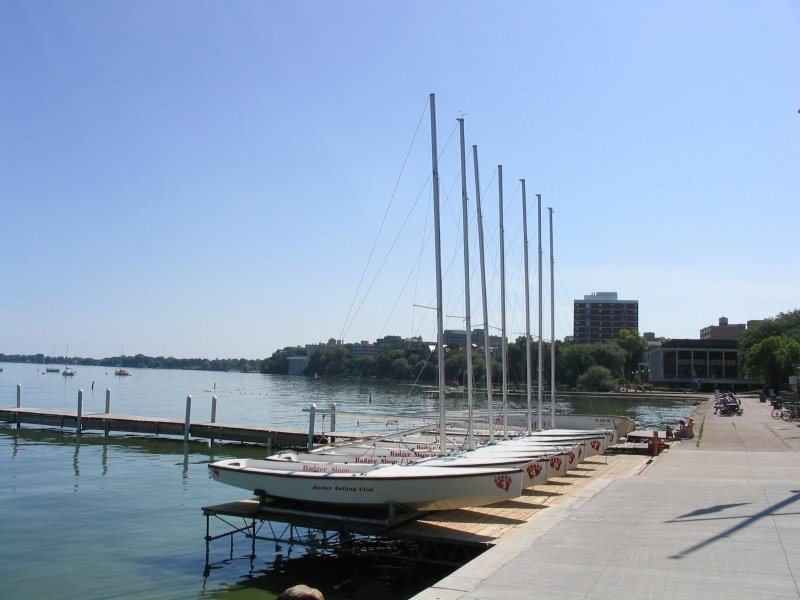
Hoofer Badger sloops along Lake Mendota.

The Hoofer Sailing Club operates at Memorial Union in the basement of the Theater wing, on the south shoreline of Lake Mendota on the University of Wisconsin–Madison campus. It has a fleet of more than 120 boats, sailboards and kites. At its peak in the mid-1970's the club had 2000 members all paying $30 to be a member for the summer. Nearly 50 lessons were run daily with over 50 identical Tech Dinghies racing Monday, Wednesday and Friday evenings.

The club currently has around 600 members. It is believed to be the second-largest inland sailing club in the country. The club has a highly-active instruction program, with thousands of lessons each season taught by paid and volunteer staff. Members have free access to use equipment after they have completed their instruction and earned a certification. In the winter months, the club has on-land classes and a snow-kiting program.

The club also hosts the University of Wisconsin undergraduate sailing team, nicknamed Wisco, which competes in the Intercollegiate Sailing Association.

The sailing club originated in 1939 as an all-volunteer club whose members maintained boats and taught each other how to sail on wooden dinghies. Peter Barrett brought the first wooden Tech dinghy from M.I.T. in the 1950s, and it became the club's signature boat. Peter and Olaf Harken modified M.I.T.'s fiberglass Tech design with air tanks under the gunwales, so that a capsized boat could be righted and come up mostly dry, to create the Badger Tech dinghy. The two brothers founded their first company, Vanguard Sailboats, as well as Harken to construct a fleet of these boats.

The club has expanded to sail fifteen types of craft today. In 2003, the sailing club added a cruising sailing curriculum with the donation of Spray, a 30-foot cruising yacht, by a retired electrical engineering professor. The cruising program was very popular, and so in 2010, the club became an American Sailing Association-certified school. (There are charges in addition to the dues for ASA certifications and classes.)

== Hoofer Ski and Snowboard Club ==
Originally started as the Badger Ski Club with three pairs of skis in 1931, the Ski and Snowboard club has grown to one of the largest clubs of its kind. The club plans a variety of ski and snowboard trips for University of Wisconsin students and union members, ranging from out west, Midwest, and local trips. It had been long-standing tradition that the club organize a 200+ person trip to Jackson Hole, Wyoming, during the university's spring break. The club also includes an Alpine Racing Team, Nordic Team, and Freestyle Team. Several annual campus events are organized by the club such as the Rail Jam freestyle competition at Union South and ski and snowboard movie premieres. Since 1963 the club has hosted a ski and snowboard resale every December, which has grown to be the largest in the Midwest. At the resale the local community can buy and sell new or used ski and snowboard equipment. Hoofer Ski and Snowboard Club also offers lessons to those who would like to learn to ski or ride or would like to improve their skills.

== Hoofer Outing Club ==
Founded in 1945, the Outing Club combines a number of outdoor pursuits under a single umbrella club. The Outing club is an all-volunteer, student-run organization, though members need not be affiliated with the UW. The Outing Club is active year-round, with Interest Groups in Caving, Road Cycling, Mountain Biking, Rock Climbing, Telemark Skiing, XC Skiing, Whitewater Paddling, Flatwater Paddling, and Hiking/Backpacking. The club owns a piece of undeveloped property referred to as "Hooferland" in the town of Silver Cliff, which is near Lakewood, WI, which it uses to stage various weekend trips throughout the year.

The Outing Club was instrumental in developing the sport of whitewater paddling in Wisconsin in the 1960s, as it owned molds to build boats in its shop facilities in the basement of the Memorial Union. In the late 1970s, club member Gordy Sussman started a small outfit in his rental house near campus to make group purchases of paddles, and other equipment, to get discounts and save on shipping costs. He developed this operation into the Rutabaga Paddlesports shop, a successful local business that presents Canoecopia, claimed to be the world's largest paddlesports exposition.

== Other clubs ==
Currently there are the following other specialized clubs:

- Hoofer Riding Club (including Hoofer Equestrian Center) (since 1939)
- Hoofer Mountaineering Club (since 1949)
- Hoofer SCUBA Club (since 1976)

== Former clubs ==
Past clubs:

- Badger Ski Club (1920, the first club, renamed Hoofer Skiing and Outing Club in 1931)
- Hoofer Skiing and Outing Club (1931, eventually becoming the Hoofer Ski and Snowboard Club)
- Hoofer Archery Club (1934, suffered from lack of permanent shooting range and in 1965 was made into Hunting Club, which was about shooting prey rather than targets; survived until 1967, folding into Hoofer Outing)
- Hoofer Canoe Club (1952–1957, folded into Hoofer Outing)
- Ecology Club (1970s, short-lived)
- Hoofer Environment Club (1980s, short-lived)
- Hoofer Gliding Club

== Notable members ==
- Brothers Paul Bietila and Walter Bietila, selected for the 1940 US Olympic ski jumping team. The Games were canceled due to World War II. Walter became captain of the 1948 team, and later served on the US National Olympic Committee. Famous Hoofer Sailing Club members include Peter Barrett, an Olympic sailing gold (1968) and silver (1964) winner, and Peter and Olaf Harken, founders of Harken, Inc., a sailing-hardware manufacturer. Russell Robinson two-time back to back winner of US Sailing Champion of Champions Regatta. Paul Exner five-time winner of the Tech Intergalactics.
