= Leon Pescheret =

British-born American artist

Leon Rene Pescheret
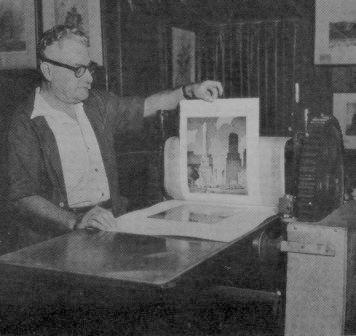
- Pescheret (1933) in Gallery Studio
- Born: March 15, 1892; Chiswick, London, England
- Died: February 23, 1971 (aged 78); Tucson, Arizona, U.S.
- Other name: Léon-René Pescheret
- Education: Art Institute of Chicago, Royal College of Art
- Occupations: designer, watercolorist, etcher, illustrator.

Leon Rene Pescheret, also known as Léon-René Pescheret (March 15, 1892 – February 23, 1971) was a British-born American designer, watercolorist, etcher, and illustrator.

== Early life ==
Pescheret was born in the London suburb of Chiswick, England to French parents. His father was a chef for Queen Victoria until she died. Pescheret began his studies at the Royal College of Engraving in Kensington under Malcolm Osborne, and the Battersea Polytechnic (now called the University of Surrey) in London. In 1910, his father moved the family to Washington, D.C. and became chef for the British Ambassador to the United States.

Pescheret served in the United States Army during World War I. After returning from World War I, Pescheret began experimenting with etching striking his first plate in 1926. He was admitted to the Chicago Society of Etchers in 1928.

By the 1920s he was attending the Art Institute of Chicago, studying interior design under French artist and muralist Albert François Fleury. In 1934, Pescheret traveled back to Europe to study with Roger Hebbelinck, who was the color etcher to the court of Belgium. He studied engraving in England at the Royal College of Art, under Malcolm Osborne and Robert Austin.

He was previously married to Grace Wallar Pescheret (1884–1950); and in 1951, he married Katherine Louis Pescheret (née Firebaugh; 1898–1985).

== Career ==
Pescheret devoted his business to etching full-time by 1930. While exhibiting in 1933 at the Century of Progress, he became interested in color etchings. To study this craft, he returned to Europe and became the private pupil of Roger Hebbelinck, a famous color etcher, and gained practical knowledge in doing one and multiple plate work.

In 1936, he purchased the Halverson Home located on 519 West Main St., Whitewater, Wisconsin and opened his art studio and gallery there. For the next 31 years he produced both color and monochrome etchings from this studio.

Pescheret authored several books including "An Introduction to Color Etching" (1952) and "Principle and Practice of Interior Decorating" (1925). He also illustrated two books written by Alfred Hoyt Granger, "The Spirit of Vienna" (1935) and "Chicago Welcomes You," (1933) as well as contributing works to American Artist and Arizona Highways magazines.

Pescheret did various architectural, interior designs and decorative art projects in his career including for Drake Hotel in Chicago, the Memorial Union Building at the University of Wisconsin; the Peoria, Illinois Country Club; and the British Museum.

His work was show at galleries and museums throughout the United States including a one-man show at the Smithsonian Institution in Washington, D.C. His work is held in the collections of The New York Public Library, the Library of Congress, Art Institute of Chicago, the King of Belgium's private collection in Brussels, the British Museum, and private collections throughout the United States and Europe.

Pescheret was a member of the Society of American Engravers.

== Architectural design ==
Pescheret practiced architectural design creating the interiors of the Drake Hotel in Chicago, the Memorial Union at the University of Wisconsin in Madison, as well and numerous institutional and private interiors. He developed the interior design of the Peoria Country Club, Pierce Hall at Kenyon College in Gambier, Ohio.

== Tucson and the Southwest ==
Pescheret began visiting Tucson and Arizona in winter of the late 1930s. The annual winter visits expanded is visual understanding of the American Southwest. Pescheret speaking at the Sheboygan Women's Club in October 1938 recognized Arizona as one of the states "which offer the widest range of scenery." The Sheboygan Press reported that "From Arizona scenes he received inspiration for two unusual sketches, Spanish Yuca and the Coachwhip. The first shows the desert plant which grows to a height of 18 feet in full bloom against an azure sky, The Coachwhip or Devil's Walking Stick, is another form of giant cacti rarely seen anywhere else but in Arizona."

In April 1940 Pescheret visited Mexico, he would later speak publicly about the country as a "land of great contrasts, great wealth and extreme poverty, beautiful churches and the meanest hovels, marvelous climate and barren country." He visited Mexico City, Taxco, the floating island gardens of Xochimilco and Toluca documenting life and iconic details of places that could become that basis for etching. These photographic images were noted by the Freeport Journal Standard as "emphasizing detail rather than general effect. He presented the point of view of the artist, rather than the historian or anthropologist and this variation proved of special interest."

This period resulted in important work that emphasized shadows and architectural texture. Significant works inspired by this trip included: "Doña Berta's, Taxco," "Market Place, Taxco Mexico," (1940) and a color images of the street and bell towers of the Taxco cathedral titled "Taxco Mexico." (1940) and "Taxco Cathedral, Mexico."

His work with one-plate color etching led to recognition within the Tucson artist community. During this period, he spoke to art classes and groups, and his work was included in exhibits and shown through private residential receptions.

In March 1942, on a visit to Tucson, Pescheret spoke to the combined art classes at the University of Arizona and the Advertisers National Federation in Phoenix on the topic of one plate color etching and this phase of his work. During these lectures Pescheret articulated his philosophy that artist should produce quantities of prints to drive down the price so that they can be acquired by the general public and avoid limiting production to elevate scarcity so only collectors and museums can buy them. In discussing the single plate color etching process with the Arizona Daily Star in 1942, Pescheret explained that he only produced six plates a year each an open edition of 200 prints. These prints are produced on large copper plates, the smallest 10 by 12 inches the largest 13 by 18 inches.

Through the 1940s Pescheret became a fixture in the Arizona art scene. In 1944 the Phoenix Writers Club published a volume of poetry titled "Random Arrows," Pescheret contributed a desert etching that was reproduced as the frontispiece of the book.

In 1946 Pescheret exhibited 24 color etching at an exhibit at the Arizona State Museum as part of a one-man show in Tucson, Arizona. The etching showed the southwestern desert and images of Wisconsin, Tennessee and New England.

While Pescheret's work mastered monochromatic images, he established a national reputation as a color etcher. Most of his work was produced using a single plate, all the color necessary to the development of the image rubbed into the copper plate then printed by passing the plate and through the press. Only one print is obtained from one coloring, and it must be a perfect print, as no additions or subtractions can be made after the print is struck.

In 1954 Pescheret's color etching were shown at the O'Brian Galleries in Phoenix and in 1955 the Arizona State Museum exhibited thirty of his color etching. During the exhibit Pescheret gave a gallery talk. In 1957 his black and white and color prints were shown at the Tucson Art and Craft Market Gallery in Tucson.

Leon Pescheret closed the Whitewater studio in 1967, relocating to Tucson, Arizona. He died after a long illness on February 23, 1971, in a hospital in Tucson.

=== Desert etchings ===
Pescheret's desert etchings from Arizona, New Mexico and California blended his distinctive style with stark landscapes, open spaces and skies, romantic architecture and vibrant coloring. Many of his color images of Arizona were featured and distributed nationally in Arizona Highways Magazine.
