= Mullo =

The term Mullo may refer to:

- Mullo (vampire), a type of vampire in Roma folklore
- Mullo (god), in Celtic mythology
- 5164 Mullo, an asteroid - see List of minor planets: 5001–6000

== See also ==
- Mulo (disambiguation)
