= Wisconsin Union Theater =

Performing arts center in Madison, Wisconsin

Coordinates: 43°4′35″N 89°24′0″W

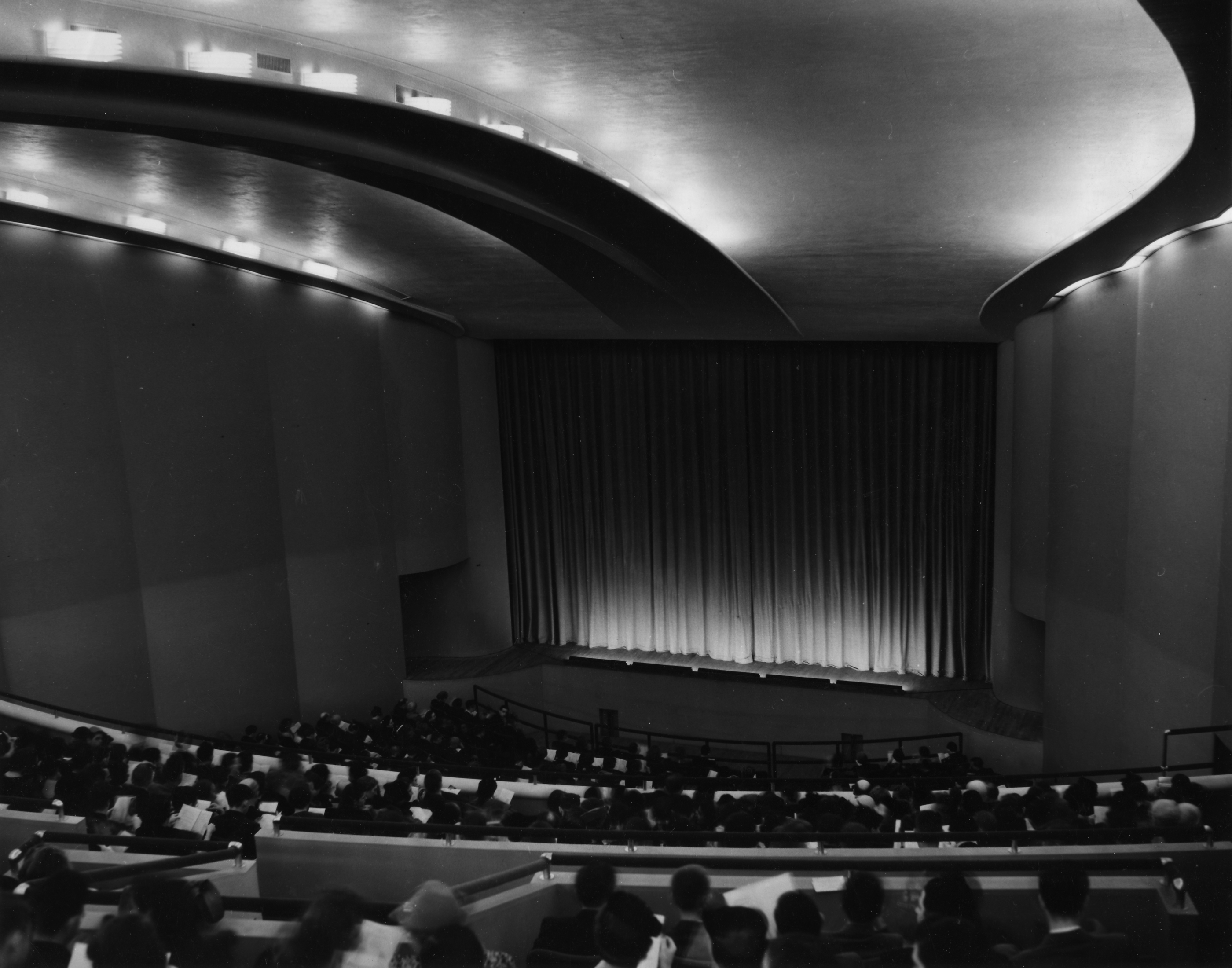
The Wisconsin Union Theater

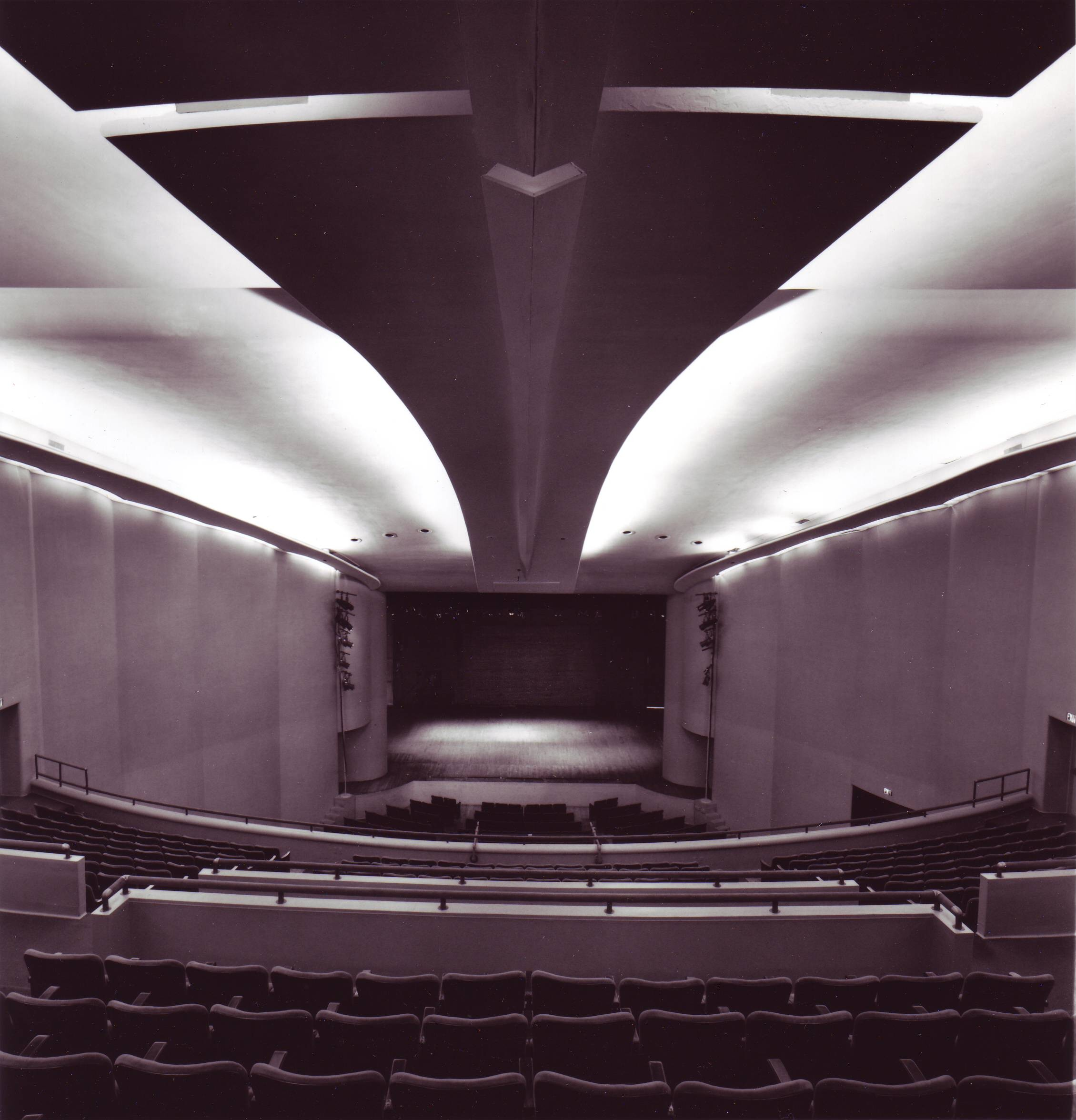

The Wisconsin Union Theater is a performing arts center in Madison, Wisconsin, located in the University of Wisconsin–Madison's Memorial Union. Wisconsin Union Theater performances include world stage, concerts, dance, jazz and other special events.

== History ==
The theater opened in the fall of 1939 and was designed by architect Michael Hare. Statewide radio broadcast the October 8th inaugural ceremonies, and the next three days saw four performances of Shakespeare's The Taming of the Shrew, starring the leading couple of the American theater, Alfred Lunt and Lynn Fontanne.

Union Theater audiences have seen and heard some of the most famous public figures, actors, dancers and musicians in performances over the last 70 years. Eleanor Roosevelt, Fritz Kreisler, Ella Fitzgerald, Indian Prime Minister Nehru, Frank Lloyd Wright, Yo-Yo Ma, T. S. Eliot, Jesse Jackson, Arthur Rubinstein, Jascha Heifetz, Martin Luther King Jr., Robert Frost, Itzhak Perlman, John F. Kennedy, Louis Armstrong, Martha Graham, Ted Turner, Kurt Vonnegut and Dave Brubeck have all appeared at the Wisconsin Union Theater.

The Wisconsin Union Directorate allows students to participate in the programming and execution of performances at the theater. Every year, students work with the Union Theater staff on artist booking, contracts, box office and front-of-the-house management, backstage and technical crews, production, business operations, and publicity.

In 2006, a student referendum was held for the third time on funding the remodeling of Union South and the Memorial Union. The referendum passed. The Arts and Recreation Wing of Memorial Union underwent remodeling work in 2012–2014. Renovations were completed in June 2014, which marked the 75th anniversary for the Wisconsin Union Theater. Renovations included Shannon Hall – the largest space in the Union Theater with 1135 seats, The Play Circle – a technological space with room for 300, and finally the Festival Room – a new performance space for classes and workshops.

=== Controversy and renaming ===
The Play Circle, formerly named after Fredric March, was renamed in 2018 after a report, commissioned by Chancellor Rebecca Blank, outlined March's membership in an interfraternity society with the name Ku Klux Klan that was not associated the white nationalist supremacist group, the Ku Klux Klan. The report also details the creation of a second fraternal group that was affiliated with the Knights of the Ku Klux Klan in 1924 as well as Klan activity on campus and in Madison in the 1920s. On the publication of that report and an article in the Capital Times about the history of the KKK at the university, students submitted a hate and bias report in response to the names. This pressure forced the Union to take down and cover up the names of both The Play Circle and an adjacent art gallery, named after Porter Butts. A published statement suggested they would form a "social justice incubator" to address systems of white supremacy at the university. The renaming was met with criticism from historians who noted that March was a lifelong supporter of civil rights.

== Programs ==
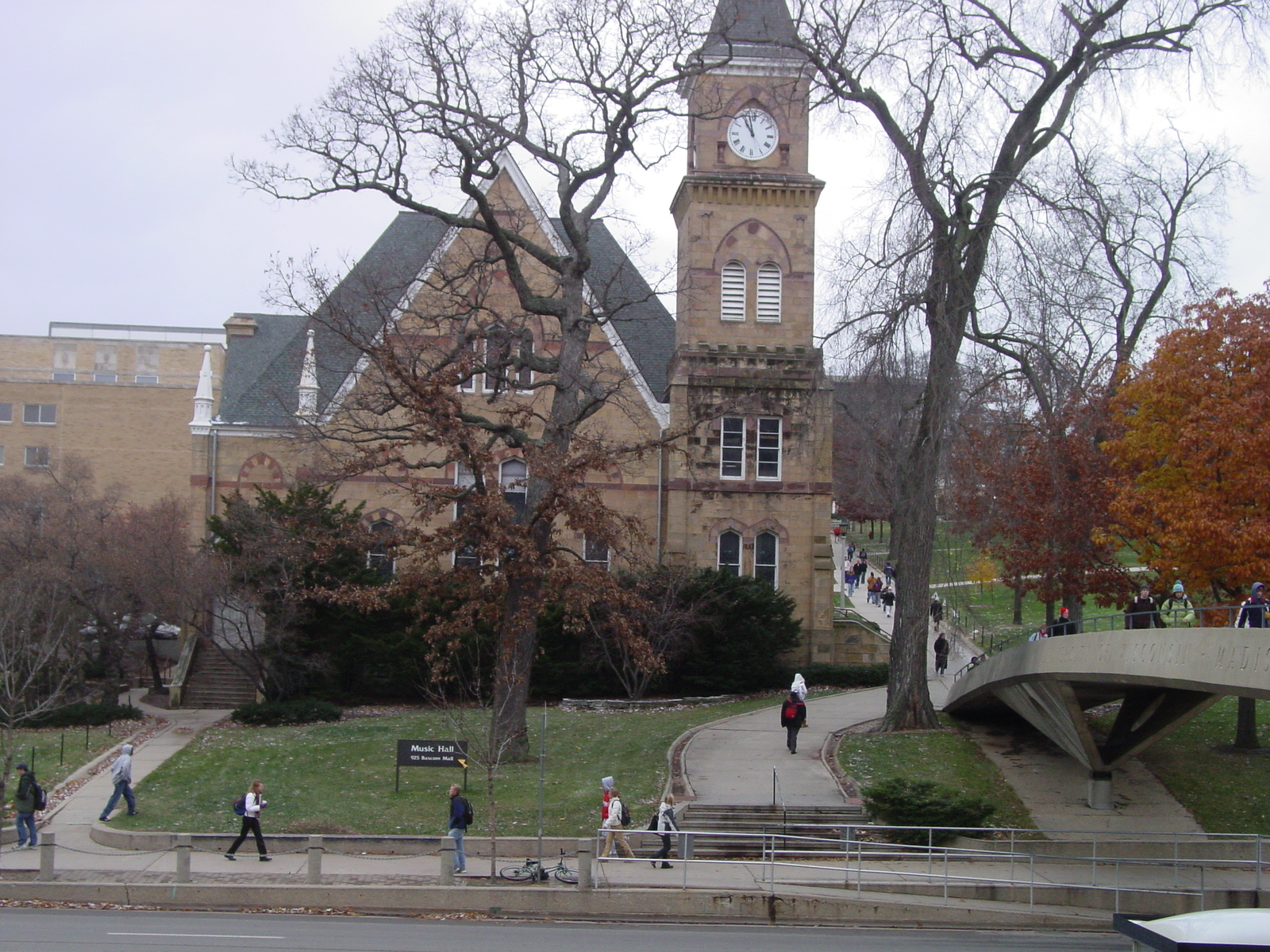
Some performances, like Toshi Reagon, are held in Music Hall

The annual Madison World Music Festival debuted in September 2004. It offers music from several countries, and is free and open to the public. Past performers have included Lila Downs, Whirling Dervishes, and Balkan Beat Box.

The Isthmus Jazz Series features jazz artists performing at the Union Theater season, and the Isthmus Jazz Fest is offered each June featuring free jazz music on the Union Terrace. The 2007 headliner was Madeleine Peyroux.

The Wisconsin Union Theater's concert series has been held since the theater opened. Each year artists perform classical works. Past performers have included Hilary Hahn, Joshua Bell, Yo-Yo Ma, Emerson String Quartet, and the Chicago Symphony Orchestra.

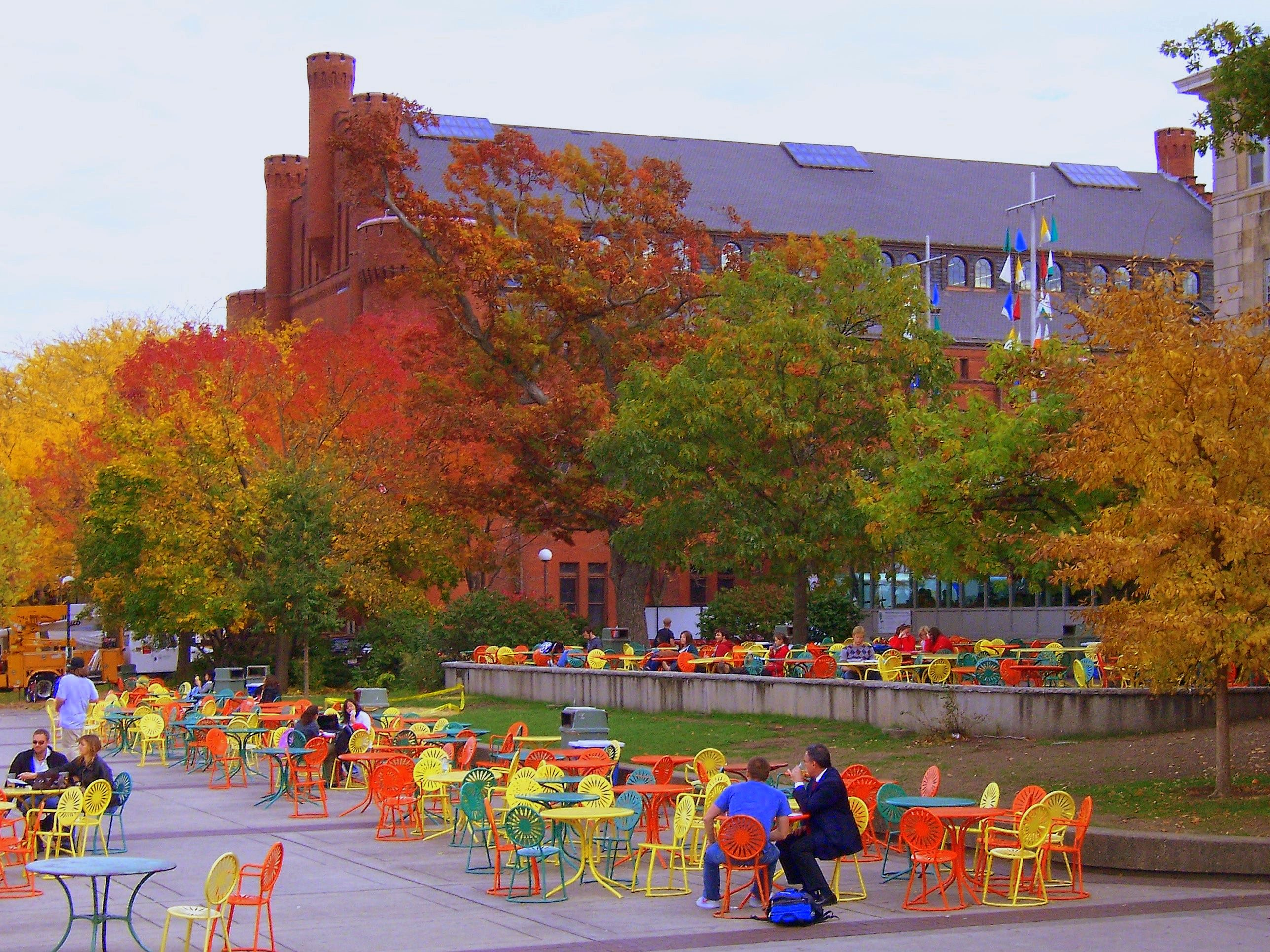
World Music Festival and the Isthmus Jazz Fest are held on the Terrace

The World Stage Series has featured artists from several countries, including Youssou N'Dour, Lila Downs, Angelique Kidjo, and Anoushka Shankar.

Special performances from the 2007–2008 season include Andrew Bird, Complexions Contemporary Ballet, and others.
