= Michael Hare (architect) =

American architect (1909–1968)

- Born: Michael Meredith Hare; January 17, 1909
- Died: August 30, 1968 (aged 59); Cambridge, Cambridgeshire, England
- Education: Columbia University
- Occupation: Architect
- Spouse: Jane P. Jopling (m. 1931)
- Children: 3

Michael Meredith Hare (January 17, 1909 – August 30, 1968) was an American architect. Based in New York City, he advocated for modernism in architecture.

== Early life and education ==
In 1931 he married Jane P. Jopling; they had three children. During the Second World War Hare served in the U.S. Marine Corps.

He later received a degree from Columbia University in 1935.

== Career ==
While a student at Yale, his experiences in Paris changed him.

Hare later worked at New York architectural firm of Corbett and MacMurray, under famed architect Harvey Wiley Corbett. While at the firm, he was a part of a team of architects that helped construct Rockefeller Center and Radio City Music Hall.

In 1936, Hare designed the Nordic Theater, a single-screen streamline moderne cinema in Marquette, Michigan. Initially the Peter White Building, the White family commissioned Hare to build the theater using an rare, unconventional design for acoustics. The Nordic Theater later served as the world premiere venue for the 1959 film Anatomy of a Murder.

In 1937, Hare designed the Wisconsin Union Theater at the University of Wisconsin.

In 1954, Hare was appointed by the President's Commission to design the U.S. embassy in Honduras. His work on the embassy was criticized for disregarding the needs of the people who had to work or live in the buildings, disregarding the climate and providing open walkways that caused the ambassador and his family to often get drenched on their way to their residence, and designing a building that ignored the views that had led to the purchase of the site to begin with.

While in Honduras, he began the study of philosophy, psychology, and psychical phenomena and wrote several books on these subjects in 1966 and 1968.

He died on August 30, 1968, in Cambridge, England.

== Known works ==
His known works include:

- Rockefeller Center (1928)
- Radio City Music Hall (1931)
- Nordic Theater (1936)
- Wisconsin Union Theater (1939)
- Dau-Kreinheder Hall (Valparaiso University) (1955)
