= Memorial Union (University of Wisconsin–Madison) =

Student Union in Madison, Wisconsin

- U.S. National Register of Historic Places
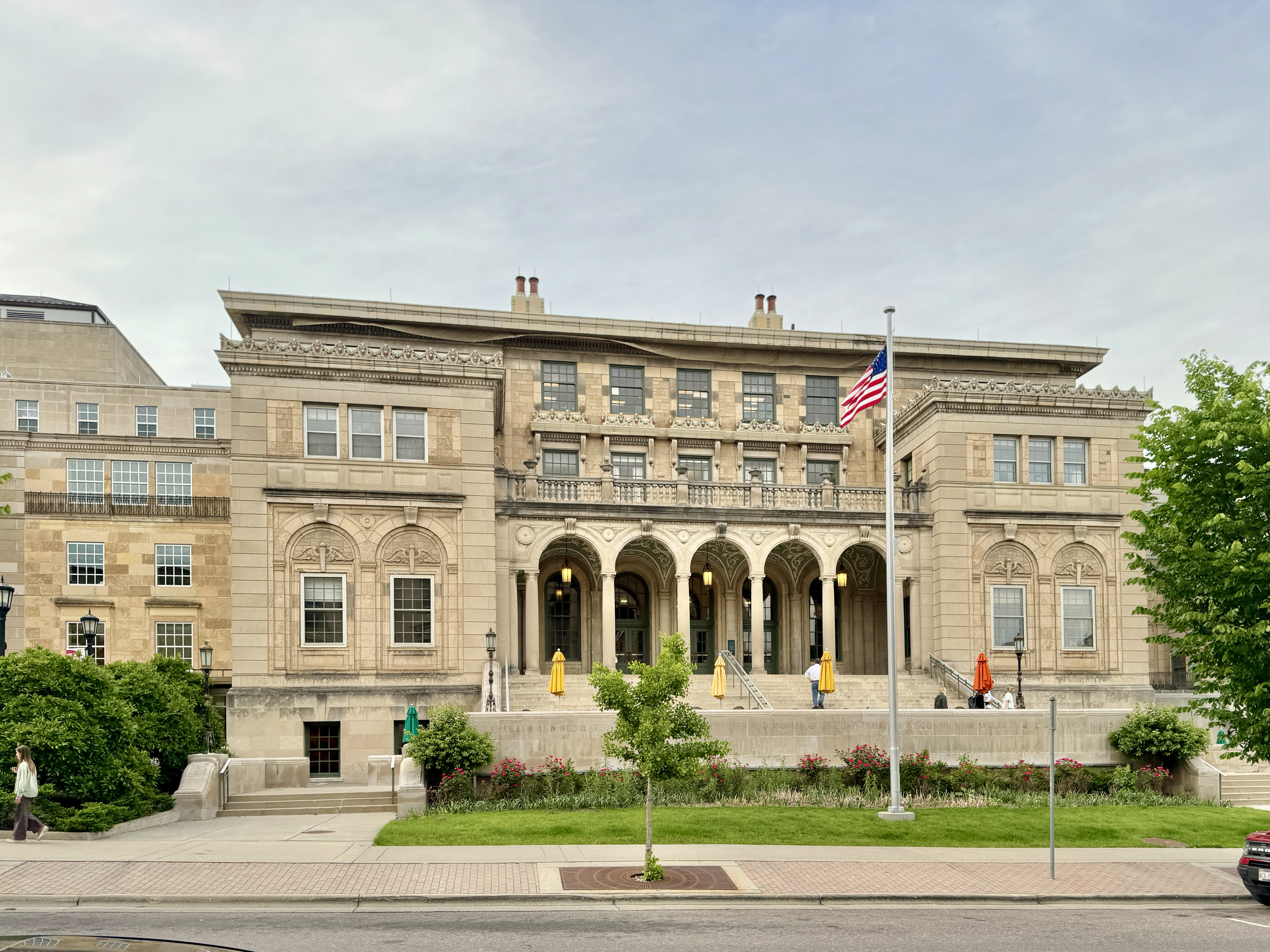
- Memorial Union facade in 2024

- Location within Wisconsin Location within the United States
- Location: 800 Langdon Street, Madison, Wisconsin
- Coordinates: 43°4′35″N 89°24′0″W
- Built: 1928, theater wing 1938
- Built by: Jacob Pfeffer of Duluth, MN (central core and commons wing), Jacobson Bros. of Chicago (theater wing)
- Architect: Arthur Peabody (exterior), Leon Pecheret (interior), Michael Hare (theater wing)
- Architectural style: Neo-Renaissance (main building), Streamline Moderne (theater wing)
- Part of: Bascom Hill Historic District (ID74000065)
- NRHP reference No.: 15000255
- Added to NRHP: May 19, 2015

Memorial Union is an Italianate Renaissance Revival-style complex built in 1926–28 at the University of Wisconsin–Madison on the south shore of Lake Mendota as a social and recreational gathering place for all students, designed partly to break down socioeconomic barriers. Before Memorial Union, the UW had no union; at its opening in 1928, then-President Glenn Frank said, "The Union is a living room, which converts the university from a house of learning to a home of learning."

On the building's north side is the Terrace, a popular outdoor space overlooking the lake. The UW's Union has gained a reputation as one of the most beautiful student centers on a university campus.

In 2015, the Union was placed on the National Register of Historic Places, considered significant as an early American college union, which was ground-breaking in supporting ideas of Progressive Era education. It is also considered significant for its association with its first director Porter Butts, who guided the Union's development from 1928 to 1968, and was a thought-leader in college unions.

== History ==
=== Background ===
In the early years of the UW in the 1850s, all students lived in North Hall with two professors and their families - an arrangement modeled on Oxford and Cambridge universities in England. That home-like model ended as the university expanded into more buildings, dividing students by field of study. In subsequent years, enrollment growth far outstripped dormitory space, forcing many students to live off campus. Beginning in the 1880s, many lived at fraternities and sororities which selected mostly students from well-to-do families - somewhat fragmenting the student body along socioeconomic lines. These divisions were mitigated by extracurricular debate clubs, literary societies, drama, music, baseball and later football, which crossed class and major. Meanwhile, the number of saloons in Madison was growing. While other states prohibited saloons near their educational institutions, Madison's common council delayed, perhaps under the influence of breweries and saloon keepers. By 1893, enrollment was over a thousand, and drunkenness, gambling and hazing were significant problems among students - particularly the men.

Around 1900 a new idea began to filter over from England - a college student union - a place where students from all corners could come together for extracurricular recreation and socialization, somewhat under the guidance of the university. In 1904 President Van Hise pitched establishing a college union at the UW as a way to develop well-rounded men:

...when the student goes out into the world, there is no other part of his education which is of such fundamental importance as his capacity to deal with men, to see the other fellow's point of view, to have sympathetic appreciation with all that may be good in that point of view, and yet to retain firmly his own ideas and to adjust the two in fair proportion. Nothing that the professor or the laboratory can do for the student can take the place of daily close companionship with hundreds of his fellows.... The union should be a commodious and beautiful building, comfortably, even artistically furnished. When the students are done with their work in the evening, the attractive union is at hand, where refreshments may be had, and a pleasant hour may be spent at games, with magazines, in a novel, or in social chat. The coarse attractions of the town have little power in comparison.

In 1907 the first incarnation of the Union took shape. The YMCA on Langdon Street was in financial straits because not enough students were renting rooms there. The Iron Cross, a men's senior honor society, formed the Men's Union Board, which leased the main floor of the YMCA to use as a men's club. There they had a reading room, billiards, and sold cigars. They organized social events, dances at Lathrop Hall (the women's social center), variety shows, and get-togethers between faculty and students. These events were generally successful, and fulfilled some of the goals Van Hise mentioned above. But at the same time, the YMCA was becoming stronger. By 1916 the Y had had enough cigars and billiards and ended its lease to the first Wisconsin Men's Union. With that, the first Union moved to a house on the site of the Commons wing of the present union until 1925, then to a house on the site of the Theater Wing until 1928.

=== Building it ===
After efforts failed to get the state legislature to fund a men's union building, the proponents turned to private fund-raising. The effort was led by Walter J. Kohler Sr., who felt that the UW's enrollment growth had eroded camaraderie and a men's union could remedy that. This was 1919, and the union was also pitched as a memorial to honor students and faculty who had given their lives in WWI. This effort to fund the Union was the first attempt to finance a UW building with private money. The initial fund-raising appeal went to wealthy men around the state. A second phase starting in 1921 solicited donations from alumni and the student body. Daily Cardinal editor Porter Butts urged support of the union in his articles. Classes were pitted against each other, with a cannon fired from Observatory Hill for every $500 the seniors raised. The city and faculty chipped in too, and part of J. Stephen Tripp's bequest went into it.

Before that, the Memorial Union Building Committee had visited existing college unions at the universities of Toronto, Michigan, Pennsylvania and Harvard. They came back praising Hart House in Toronto for its good lounge rooms, the common dining hall, large gymnasium and swimming pool, faculty commons and dining rooms, library, music room, sketch room, and 500-seat theater. They criticized some of the unions for not being run by students.

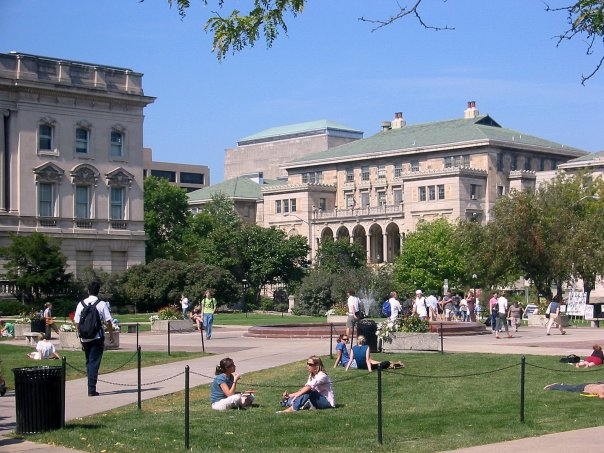
Library mall in foreground, with a bit of Historical Society at left and Union at right

The exterior of the main wing was designed by University Architect Arthur Peabody and/or Frank Moulton to fit with the earliest buildings on campus - North, South and Bascom halls - and to complement the nearby Neoclassical-styled State Historical Society/University Library. He also aimed it to be dignified, given its role as a memorial building. To achieve these ends, he chose a Neoclassical/Beaux Arts style inspired by Renaissance summer waterfront villas of northern Italy. The building was clad in Madison sandstone and trimmed with grey Bedford stone.

By 1925 donors had pledged $880,000, but only half of that had been given in cash. The rest was only pledges, and with the fundraising dragging on so long, the fundraising committee feared that some donors were doubting that the union would ever be built. So in November 1925 they went ahead with a groundbreaking. Serious work on the project did not begin until a year later. By that time the project still was not fully funded, so they delayed building the theater wing and focused on only the central core of the building and the Commons wing.

The winning bid for construction was from Jacob Pfeffer of Duluth. This was at a time when organized labor was growing stronger, and many of the regents generally supported labor. Pfeffer ran an open shop, but his company won the bid and construction proceeded until some union men refused to work in April 1927, protesting the use of non-union men in the project. Pfeffer shipped in more non-union replacements from Duluth to keep the project going. The picketers began to harass the remaining workers, throwing stones. Police did not tamp down the situation. Things escalated until on May 20 a mob of union men demolished the shanty where the non-union men were living, beating some non-union men and throwing some in the lake. The worst hurt suffered a broken jaw, broken ribs, broken teeth, and one man lost an eye. Someone also threw ink on the front wall. After this and a few more incidents, public opinion shifted against the protests, the UW got a restraining order against the protesters, and things settled down.

The project had developed under the name "Wisconsin Men's Union," and was planned to be an all-male facility. Women at the UW already had Lathrop Hall as a social center. But the new union offered far more, and female students had actually supported the project more than male students. In the initial plans for the union in 1926, a small Ladies' Parlor and a few bathrooms were reserved for women, but that was all. After discussions in 1927, women were given much more access to the union, and the full name was changed from "Wisconsin Men's Union" to "Wisconsin Memorial Union". Women were still excluded from the games room, Paul Bunyan Room, Tripp Commons and the Rathskeller, but those bastions of manliness would gradually fall, until women were admitted to even the Rathskeller in 1947.

Opened on October 5, 1928, the facility is operated by the Wisconsin Union, a membership organization. Porter Butts, the first director, called it a "college union" because it combines the characteristics of a student union ("student activity center" in other countries) and a student government ("students' union" in other countries) in an organization that brings together students, faculty, and members of the surrounding community.

The initial building consisted of the five-story Central Core and the Commons Wing to the east, joined by a four-story hyphen. The Central Core's first floor held the Rathskeller, with a billiards room and card room to the west, a trophy hall to the south, and a barbershop to the east. On the second floor was Memorial Hall and the main lounge, the library and the art gallery. The fourth floor held Alumni Hall, which served as a women's lounge during the day and a ballroom in the evening. The Commons Wing held a cafeteria on the first floor, a kitchen in the basement, the main dining room, a smaller dining room, and a service kitchen. The third floor contained more small dining rooms and service kitchens. The fourth floor of the Commons Wing held hotel rooms.

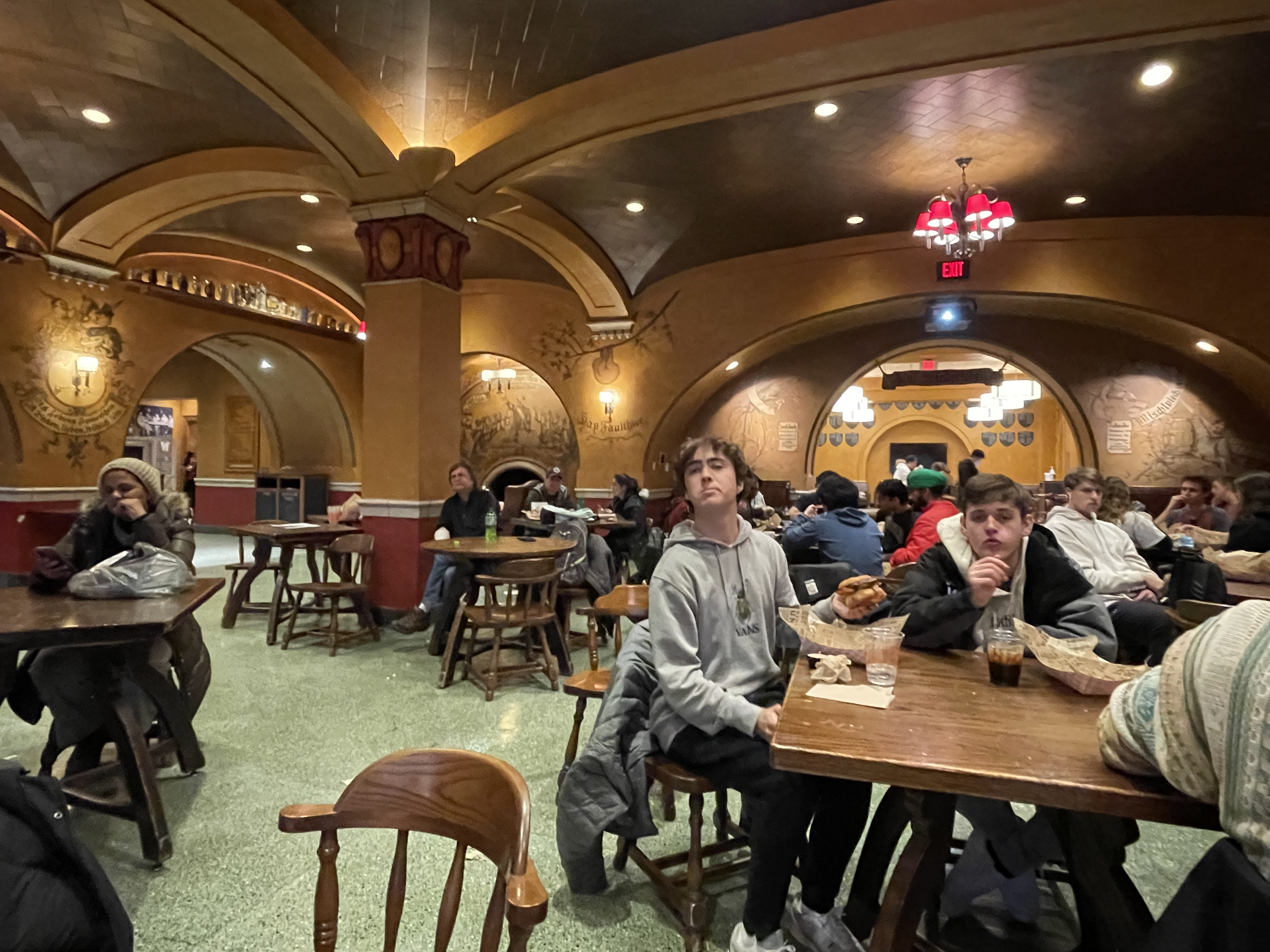
The Rathskeller in 2022

Chicago decorator Leon Pescheret designed the interior of the Union, with input from Porter Butts and others. Following their plan German immigrant artist Eugene Hausler painted frescoes of student life in the Rathskeller. Some ill-conceived images of American Indians were painted in Memorial Hall. The Paul Bunyan Room was decorated to suggest a northwoods logging camp. Other rooms were decorated to suggest Oxford, Cambridge, and the colonial America.

The terrace began to take shape early on. In 1925 Arthur Peabody had recommended that the Union building be placed close to Langdon Street to leave "a wide lawn between the Union and the lake as an undergraduate playground." Beginning in 1928 Peabody's daughter Charlotte, trained in landscape architecture, designed a rectangular flagstone patio outside the Rathskeller, enclosed with walls and shaded by large oaks which the construction had spared. Steps and a walkway led to a stone-walled landing near the lake. Another flagstone path led north through the woods. Seating on this early Terrace was hickory Adirondack chairs shaded with striped umbrellas. Horticulture instructor G.W. Longenecker designed the initial plantings.

Porter Butts was named first Director of the Wisconsin Union in 1928. He had supported the Union idea as a student as editor of the Daily Cardinal, and advanced to fund-raising administrator in 1926, so he knew the history and goals well. In his 1929-30 report he described the Union's objectives:

1. Make the UW a more human place - to convert it from a house of learning to a home of learning, as President Frank hoped.
2. Provide a "comprehensive and well-considered program for the social life of the University."
3. "...[stand] as the University's recognition of the importance of the leisure hour...[and] deal [constructively] with all the hours outside the classroom."
4. Be a "genuine student cooperative enterprise, aiming to give students experience in governing and managing their own affairs."

Elizabeth Miller observes in her NRHP nomination that each of these embodies Progressive Era ideals, on which the state of Wisconsin was a leader then.

The new Union building was popular from the start, functioning as the UW's living room as President Franks hoped. Students socialized in the Main Lounge and the Rathskeller, played billiards and chess, went to dances in the Great Hall, and ate in Tripp Commons. Beginning in 1933, Tripp Commons was converted to Club 770 each Saturday night - a nightclub with floor shows and an orchestra for dancing. Newsreels were shown in the Rathskeller in the 1930s. The Hoofers Outing Club was founded in 1931, initially teaching students to ski, but gradually expanding to camping, sailing, horseback-riding, and other outdoors activities to expand the student beyond academics.

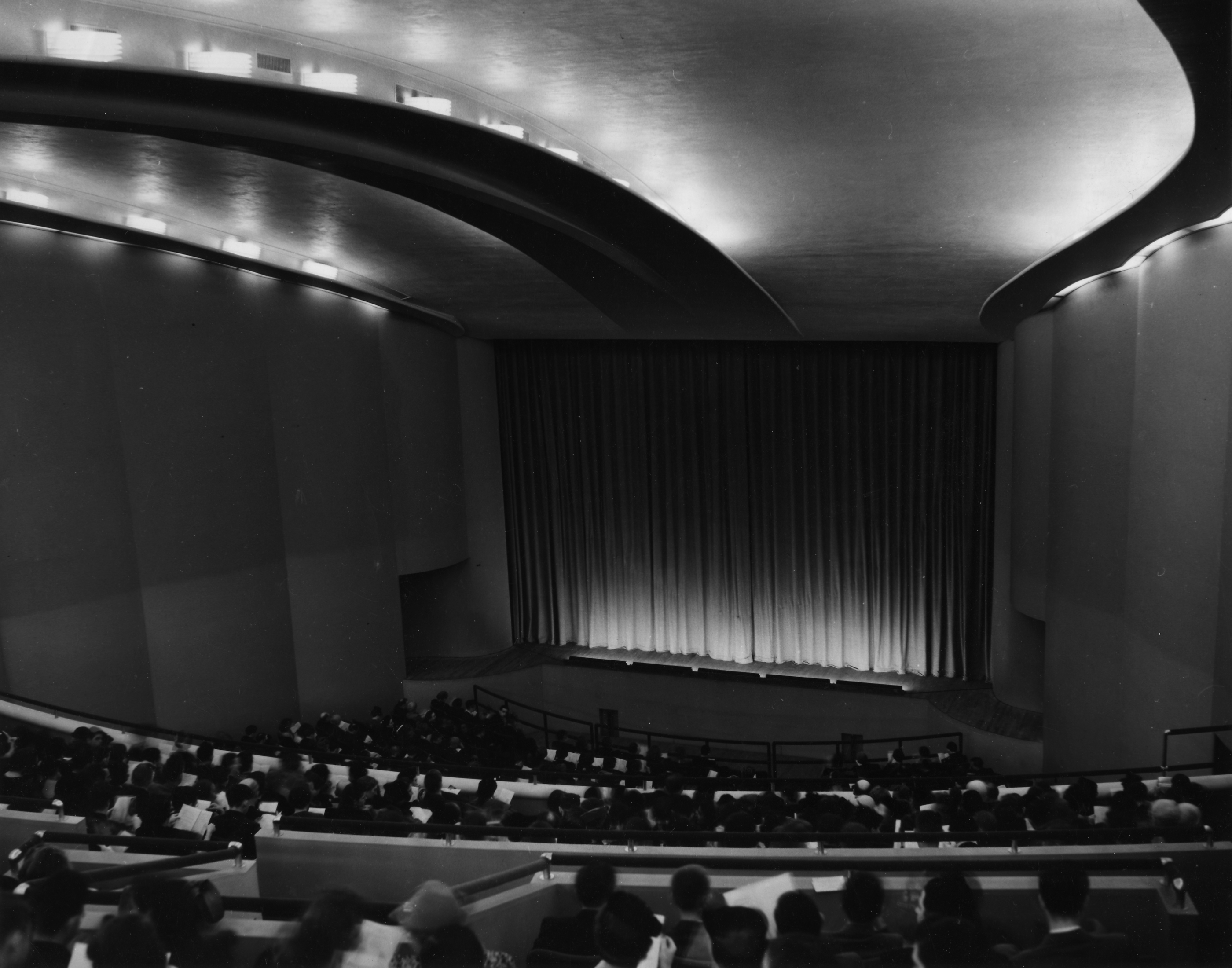
The theater

The Union's north wing had been cut from the initial project for lack of funding. In 1933 the Union council surveyed students and other stakeholders about priorities for expanding the union. A theater came out top, with bowling alleys a distant second. In 1935, the New Deal Public Works Administration granted the UW about one third the cost of a theater wing; the remainder came from loans, gifts and union reserves. New York architect Michael Hare initially designed the theater wing with input from set designer Lee Simonson to face the lake with a rounded shape that bore no relation to the rest of the Union. This did not fly with the Regents, so Hare redesigned it to make the exterior match the Italian Renaissance style of the rest of the Union, but inside that box was a curving Art Moderne-style theater. The Theater wing opened in 1939, with a performance of The Taming of the Shrew, featuring the prominent Alfred Lunt and Lynn Fontanne. The wing included the smaller Play Circle theater. In the basement were bowling alleys, the Hoofers office, and some other miscellaneous spaces.

=== Since construction ===
==== Division status ====
In 1935 the Regents made the Wisconsin Union the UW's Division of Social Education. Butts explained that one of the intentions was

...to explore all the means possible of making the unscheduled time of students, the campus environment, and informal association of students and faculty outside the classroom contributing factors in the personal and educational development of students - thus adding an important dimension to education by expanding the time area in which the university educates, and the means by which it educates.... The essence... is that it be informal teaching, without class registration and course credit, and without having to restrict participation to students enrolled in a given college."

==== Serving soldiers ====
When UW enrollment dropped during World War II the Union granted membership to military trainees in the Madison area, serving meals to 2,000 trainees daily. After the war when enrollment surged, up to 14,000 students passed through the Union each day. Similar services were extended to servicemen and women during the Korean War.

==== Maintenance ====
This traffic produced wear and tear, which has required ongoing maintenance. In 1948-1949 interiors were repainted and acoustic tile ceilings were added to reduce the din inside. Some inside areas were reconfigured into offices and meeting rooms. In 1956, the cafeteria was renovated and expanded beyond the existing building envelope. Stone that was removed from the exterior wall was reused to rip-rap the lakeshore. The cafeteria was renovated again in 1982, and again later in 2002, when it was renamed the Lakefront on Langdon.

In 2005, a referendum to build a new Union South and to renovate Memorial Union failed, but a new referendum in 2006 approved the project. Construction began in summer of 2012 and wrapped up in September 2017. These renovations included a redesign of the Terrace, a renovation of the Wisconsin Union Theater, the addition of new restaurants and study spaces, and the addition of the 1.3-acre Alumni Park, which opened in fall of 2017, and the addition of an underground loading dock, which also serves the adjacent Red Gym and Pyle Center. These improvements were performed in two phases.

- Phase I lasted from 2012 to 2014, renovating the west wing. A chunk connecting the theater to the main building was demolished and rebuilt in order to allow for a new elevator and to address accessibility issues. The Hoofers area was rebuilt too, and a new hallway was built out to the lakeshore. The Craftshop was relocated to the lower level, the Play Circle theater was rebuilt as a black box theater, a new entrance was added, a new reception area, and a new Sunset Lounge was added in front of the theater entrance. The main theater was renamed Shannon Hall.
- Phase II renovated the central core and east wings and terrace, as well as converting the parking lot into Alumni Park. A new underground loading dock was built under the park, allowing direct connection to the basement kitchens and storage areas. The loading dock also was built to serve the adjacent Red Gym and Pyle Center which eliminated the above-ground loading docks. The interior renovation included the dining areas, basement kitchen, Rathskeller, Great Hall, Main Lounge, and Tripp Commons.

Most of the Union and Terrace closed in September 2015. The Rathskeller remained open until February but the serving area was closed. A temporary sandwich bar called the Subskeller was installed.

Much of the terrace reopened in May 2016 for graduation weekend, and the first floor/basement opened the following December. The remaining areas reopened in September 2017.

==== National Register recognition ====
In 2015 the Union was added to the National Register of Historic Places, considered significant in these ways:

- Memorial Union is considered significant at a national level in the American college union movement, because it was groundbreaking among American college unions in serving the whole university community, including faculty, alumni, and women. Edith Humphreys, in her analysis of American college unions, considers Memorial Union to be an early exemplar of the Community Recreation stage of unions - not just a debating society or a men's club, but supporting the welfare and development of the student's whole person with extra-curricular activities outside of class.
- The Union is also considered nationally significant for its association with Porter Butts, who guided the Union as director from 1928 to 1968. The NRHP nomination writes, "Through Butts' energetic and visionary leadership, the Wisconsin Union offered more programming and services, and became the laboratory of more innovation, than any other college union in the country." Butts became the prominent leader of the college union movement in the US, writing books about the idea and editing The Bulletin of the Association of College Unions for many years. Through his career he consulted on planning more than 110 college unions in the US and abroad.
- The building itself is considered locally significant as an intact example of Italian Renaissance Revival design.

==== Pier collapse ====
A pier behind the Union collapsed into the lake on September 5, 2023, injuring about 20 people.

== The modern facility ==
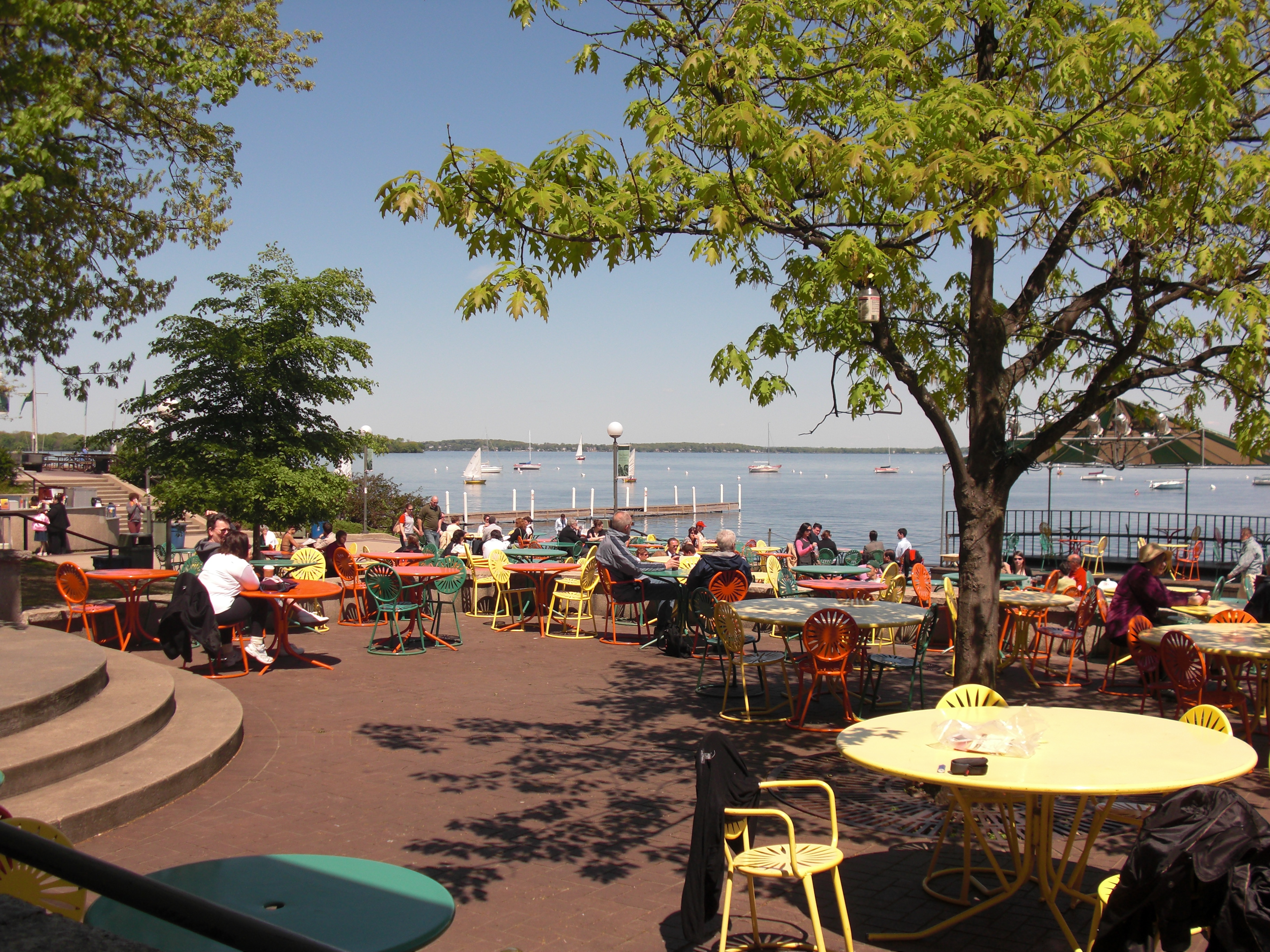
The Terrace

Outside the main building is the Memorial Union Terrace, a stone outdoor dining and recreation area on the shore of Lake Mendota. The Terrace was designed by Peabody's daughter, Charlotte. It is a popular spot among students and local residents for socializing because of the backdrop of the lake, with its view of sailboats, and the sound of live music, usually free to the public in the evening. The Wisconsin Union Directorate funds music on the Terrace four nights a week in the summer, and on the Terrace or in der Rathskeller on weekends during the school year (depending on weather).

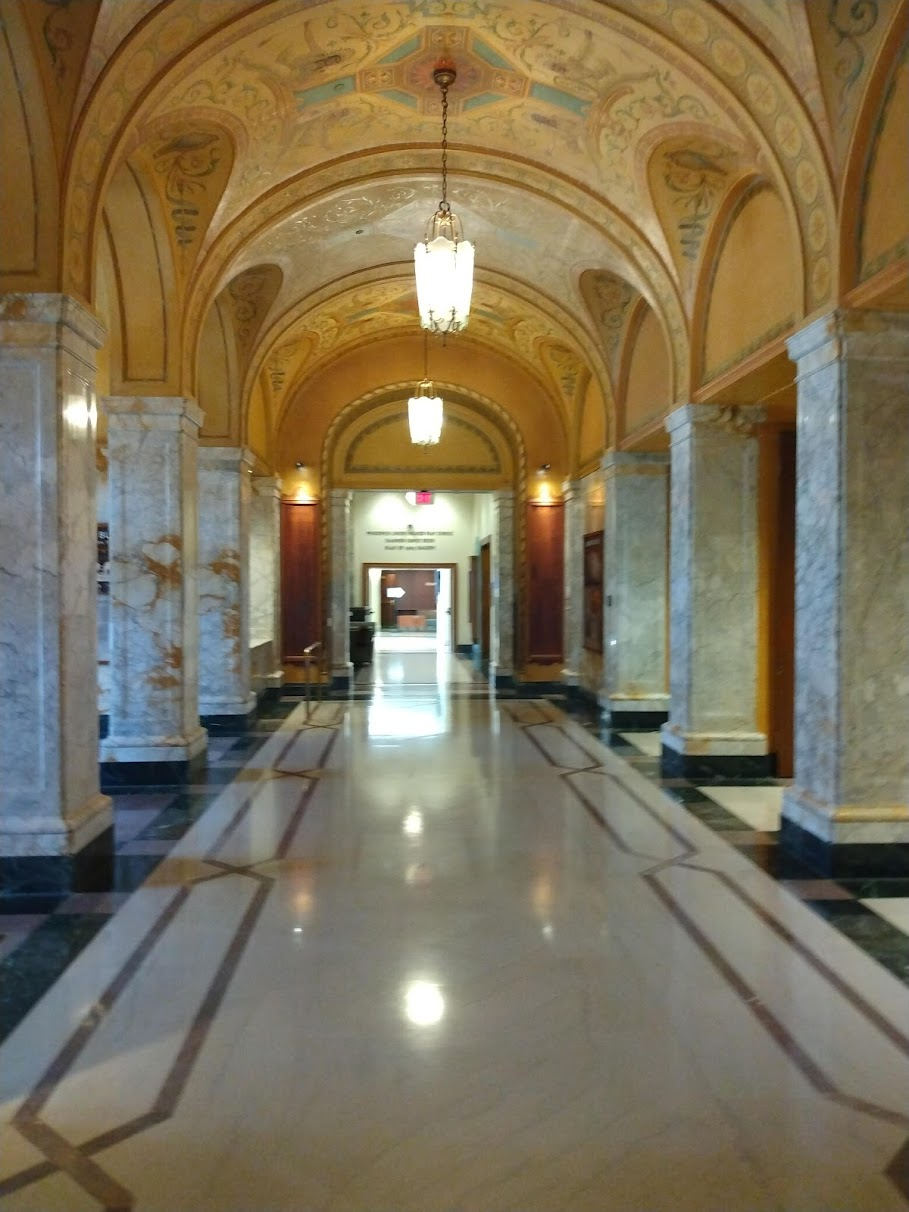
Inside the grand entrance

Within the Union are rooms and artworks reflecting the local heritage. The largest is Der Rathskeller, a German-style beerhall with elaborate murals, where political debates and card or board games are common among students over a beer. Der Rathskeller directly connects the ground floor to the Terrace outside. Also on the ground floor are the Paul Bunyan Room and dining areas. Upstairs are the Beefeater Room and the Old Madison Room. The west wing of the Union houses the Wisconsin Union Theater and Wisconsin Hoofers.

The Daily Scoop sells Babcock ice cream made at the university. Peet's Coffee Shop is a privately managed operation that serves coffee and pastries. The Campus and Community Information desk acts as an information and referral resource. There is a small retail shop offers newspapers, apparel, and snacks. The Memorial Union Box Office offers ticketing for campus events as well as bus tickets for the Van Galder Bus Line. Memorial Union houses several restaurants and cafeterias. A catering department serves conferences, events for the university, and weddings of Union members, and the annual Tudor Dinners.

The Hoofers, an activity group headquartered in the Union, offer activities on Lake Mendota and other outdoor sites.

Adjacent to the Union and Terrace is the 1.3-acre Alumni Park. The park is an art gallery and museum displaying the accomplishments of Badgers throughout the 17 decades of the university. Beneath the park is an underground loading dock, which serves the Union as well as the adjacent Red Gym, Pyle Center, and Alumni House.

== Image gallery ==
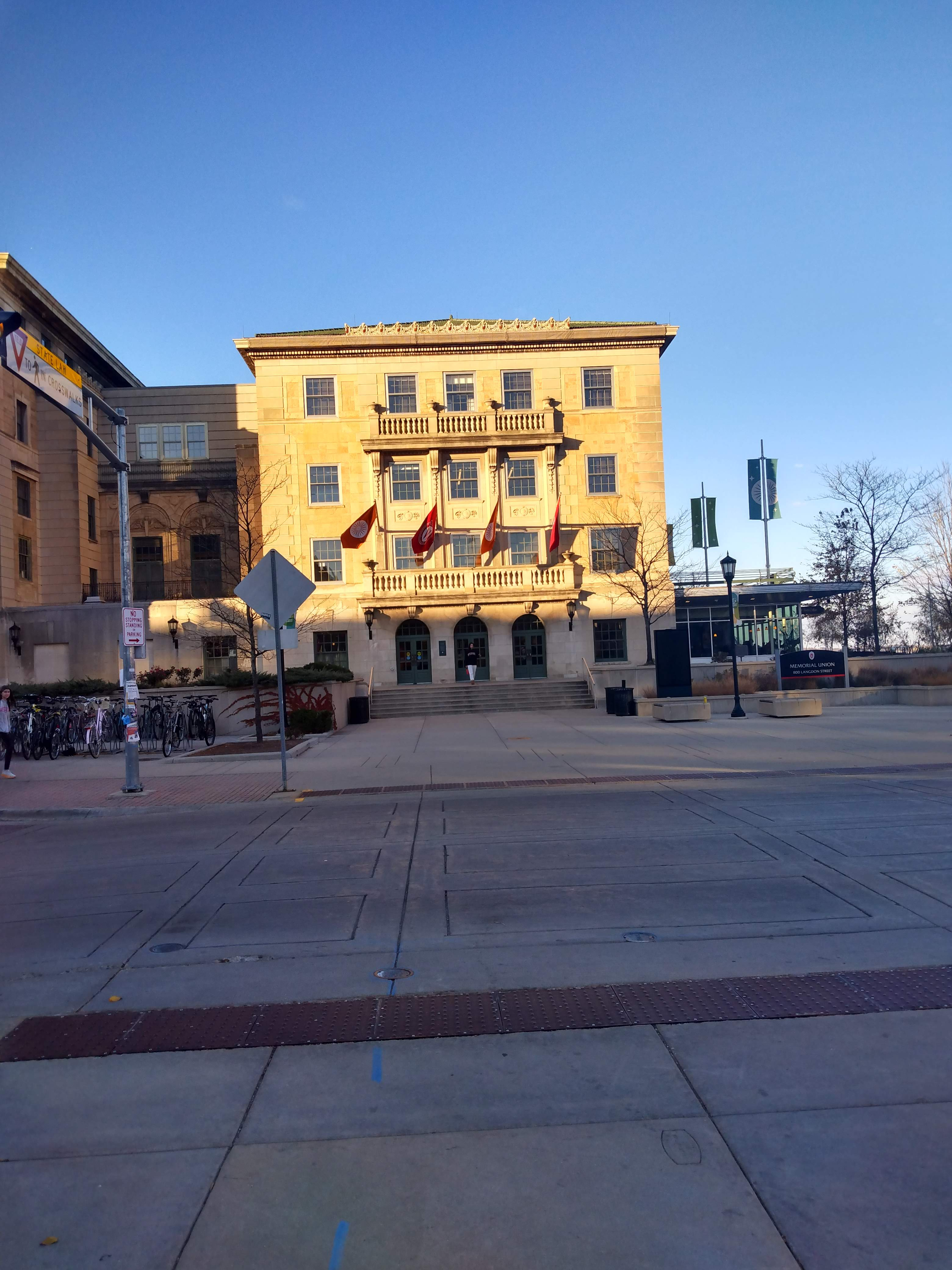
Memorial Union main entrance in 2024

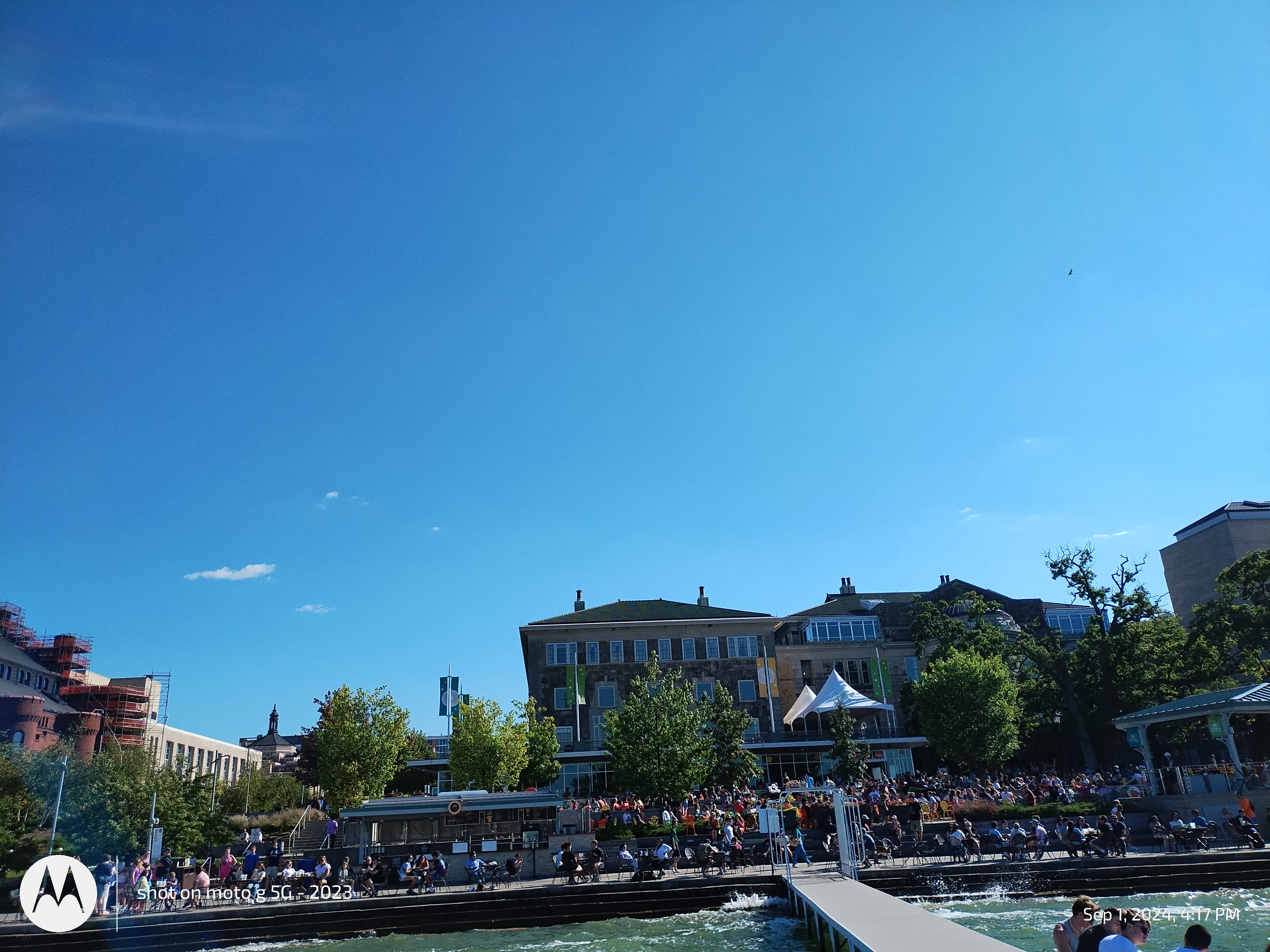
View of the Terrace in 2024

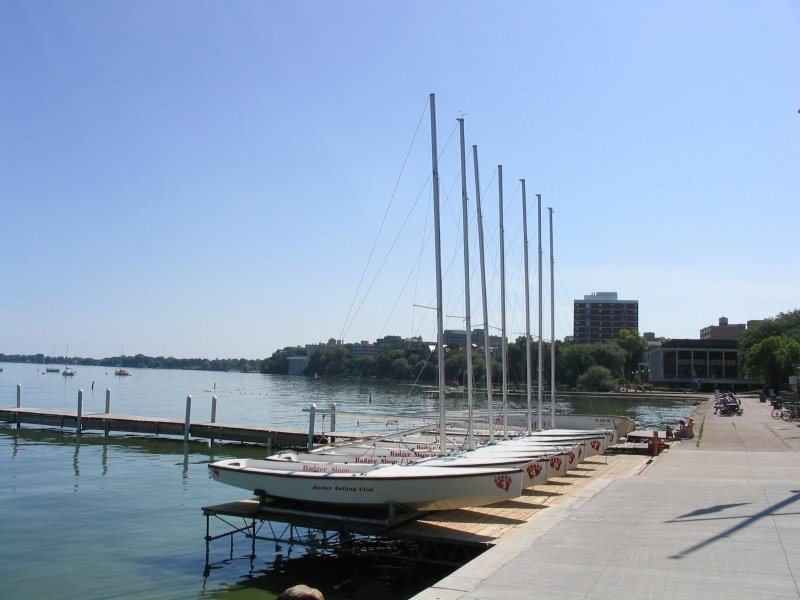
Hoofer Badger Sloops on Lake Mendota behind Memorial Union

The Terrace

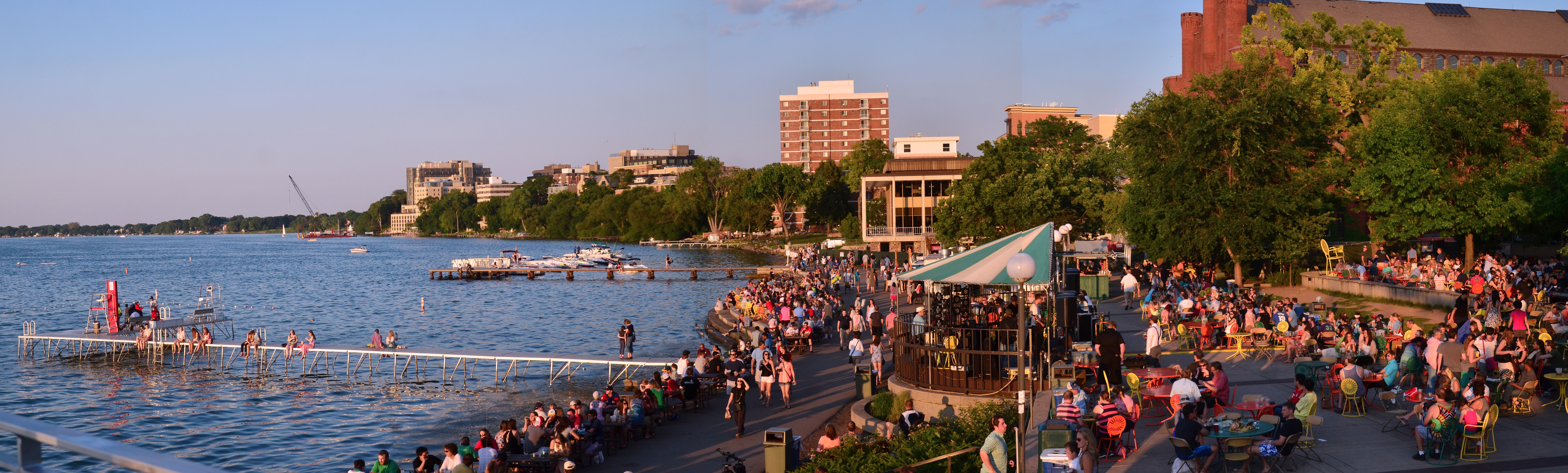
The Terrace

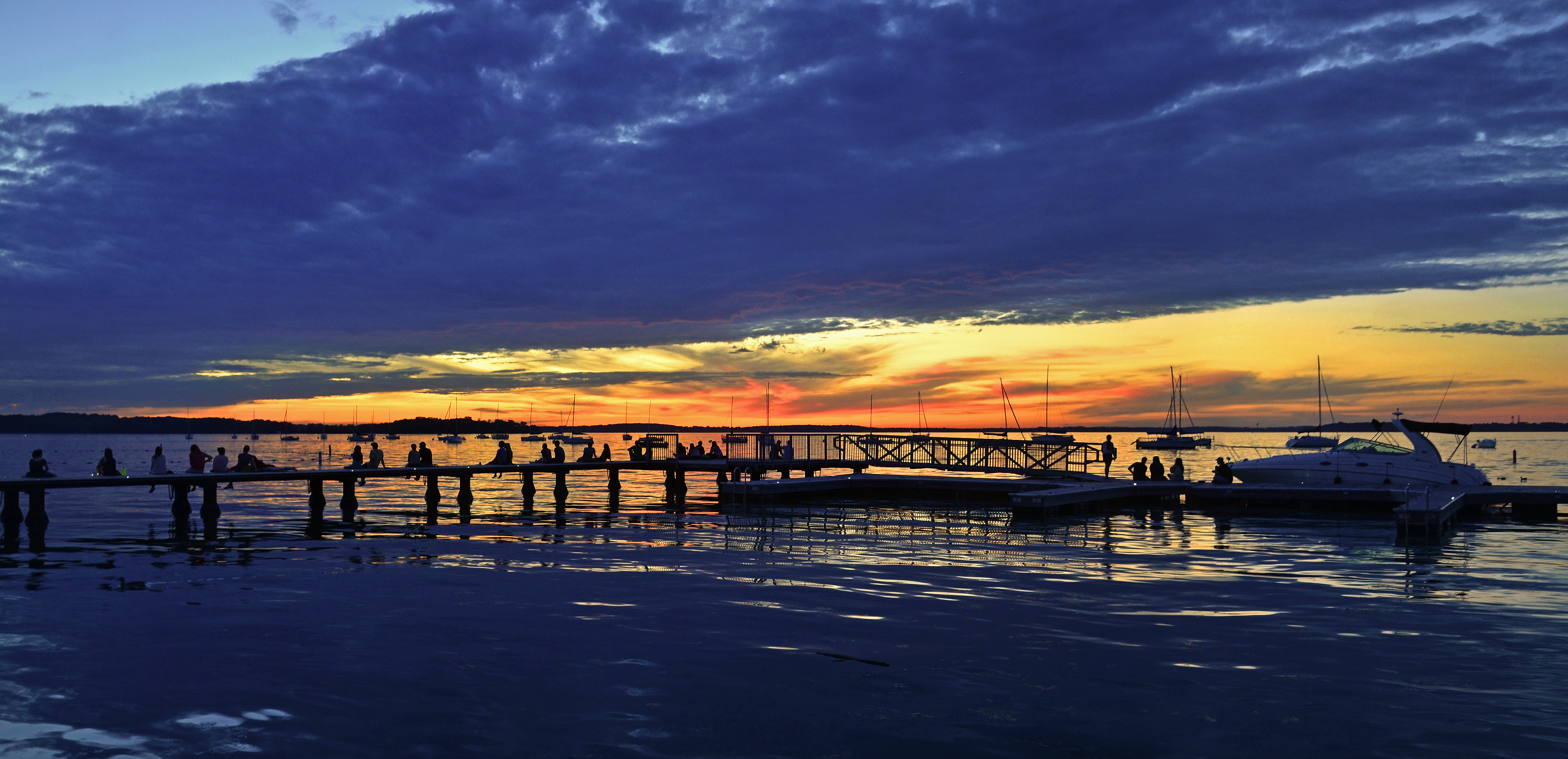
Summer solstice sunset from the Terrace, 2015
