= Wisconsin Union =

The Wisconsin Union is a community membership non-profit organization at the University of Wisconsin–Madison. It welcomes all 18 and over to join. It operates the Memorial Union, Union South, the Pyle Center, The Fluno Center and a number of food outlets in downtown Madison. All UW-Madison students are temporary members, and recent graduates are offered a substantial discount on a lifetime membership.

Members receive certain benefits and privileges not accorded the general public.

The Wisconsin Union runs more than 1,000 events throughout the year, including free and low-cost concerts, free and low-cost art activities, outdoor recreation, free film showings, free lectures by thought leaders and free art exhibitions.

== Social education ==
As the UW–Madison's Division of Social Education, the Wisconsin Union serves as the "living room of the campus" where students, faculty, staff, and community members can meet, interact, and learn from each other outside of the classroom. A craft shop offers tools, supplies, and space for crafts such as pottery, photography, and woodworking. The Wisconsin Hoofers outdoor recreation clubs offer instruction, equipment, and opportunities to participate in a wide variety of outdoor activities. The Union Theater hosts concerts, lectures, and movies. Mini-Courses offers a variety of general-interest enrichment classes. Students can learn leadership and governance by serving in one of the committees of the Union Directorate, the student programming board. The music committee brings a full schedule of live acts to the Union Terrace, der Rathskeller, and Union South. The art committee gives students a chance to curate exhibits for the Union galleries and around the buildings.

== Facilities ==
Student groups, faculty, departments and members can reserve rooms within the two Union buildings and selected sites in other campus buildings through the Central Reservations Office for meetings, conferences, dances, dinners, weddings, or many other events. Organizations such as the Associated Students of Madison student government and the Campus Women's Center have permanent office space in the Memorial Union. For large presentations and shows, the Wisconsin Union Theater can be rented.

== Food and retail ==
The food and retail operations encompass numerous restaurant and deli locations throughout the campus, two gift shops, a bar in der Rathskeller, games room, outdoor equipment rental, and full-service catering.
