= Quisling Towers Apartments =

- U.S. National Register of Historic Places
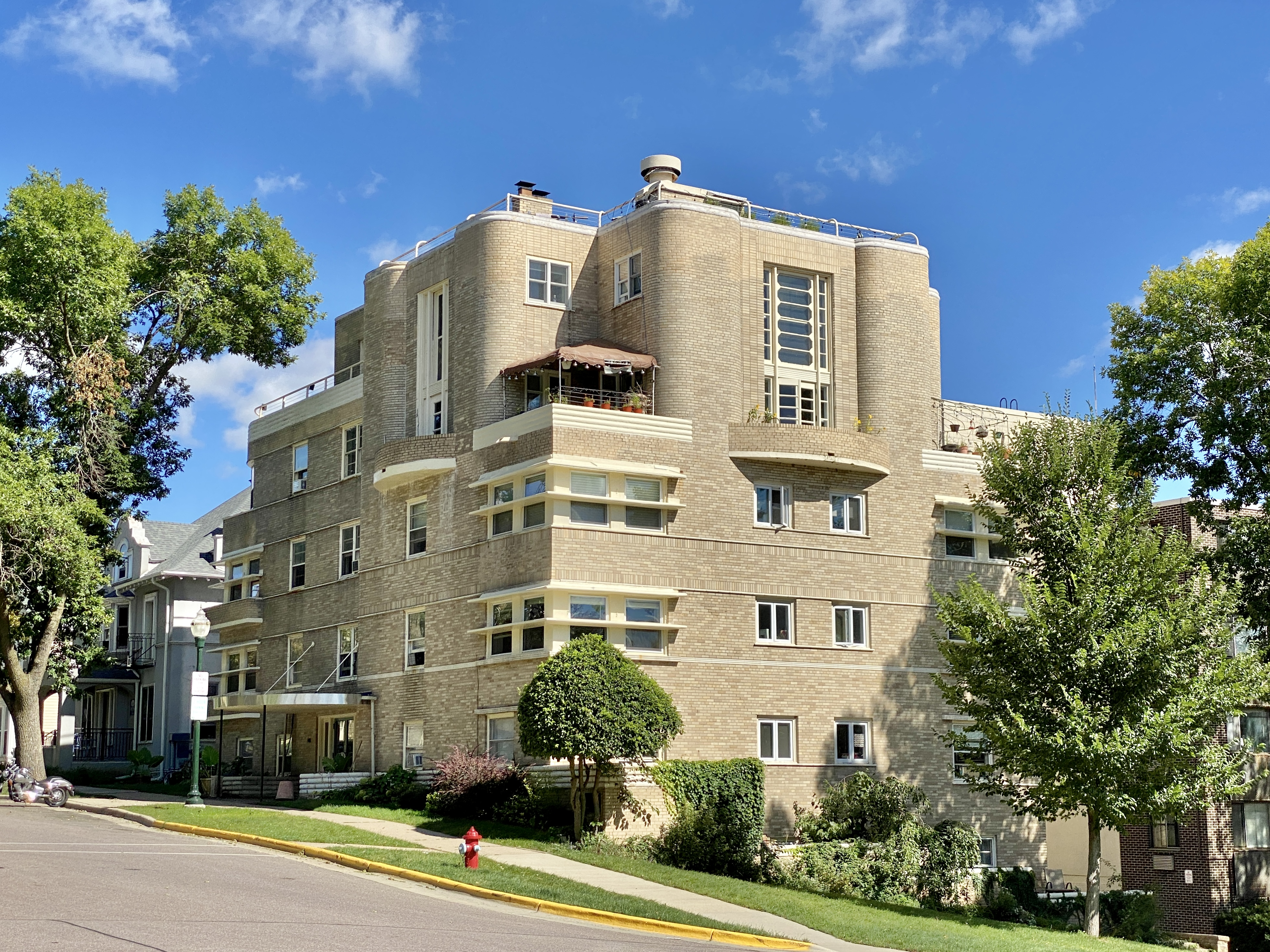
- Quisling Towers Apartments
- Location: 1 E. Gilman St. Madison, Wisconsin
- Coordinates: 43.07823°N 89.38824°W
- Built: 1937
- Architect: Lawrence Monberg
- Architectural style: Streamline Moderne
- NRHP reference No.: 84003648
- Added to NRHP: January 9, 1984

Quisling Towers Apartments is a Streamline Moderne-style building designed by Lawrence Monberg and built in 1937 in Madison, Wisconsin. Still very intact, in 1984 it was added to the National Register of Historic Places.

== History ==
Dr. Abraham Quisling was a son of an immigrant Norwegian doctor who arrived in Madison in 1900 and started a medical practice, into which he brought his four sons. Abraham and his brothers prospered and began investing in various business ventures.

In 1937, during the Great Depression, on the recommendation of his father-in-law, Abraham commissioned Danish immigrant Lawrence Monberg, then a young architect in Chicago, to design this apartment building. Monberg designed the 5-story structure in a style that was then popular and progressive - Streamline Moderne. Hallmarks of that style are the curved corners, horizontal lines, and some windows following around the corners. The main block rises three or four stories and the penthouse towers rise the remainder, leaving open balconies in the corners. The exterior is clad in a buff brick trimmed in terra cotta. A wall of the same brick steps down the hill along Wisconsin Ave.

Inside are twenty-six apartments, with walls of fireproof structural tile plastered and painted. Floors are carpeted or linoleum. The kitchens were modern in 1937, with painted pine cabinets. The lower apartments are one-bedroom or studios. The top two stories (the towers) contain three two-bedroom apartments, each two stories with living space below and bedrooms above, with balconies, two-story glass walls, curving staircases, and fireplaces.

In 1993 Quisling Towers was designated a landmark by the Madison Landmarks Commission. In 1994 it was added to the NRHP, considered "probably Madison's best example of the Art Moderne period of construction."

On the morning of February 20, 2025, a fire occurred in the lobby of the building. The Madison Fire Department responded promptly and extinguished the flames. No injuries were reported, and no residential units were affected. Initial estimates placed the damage at approximately $20,000.

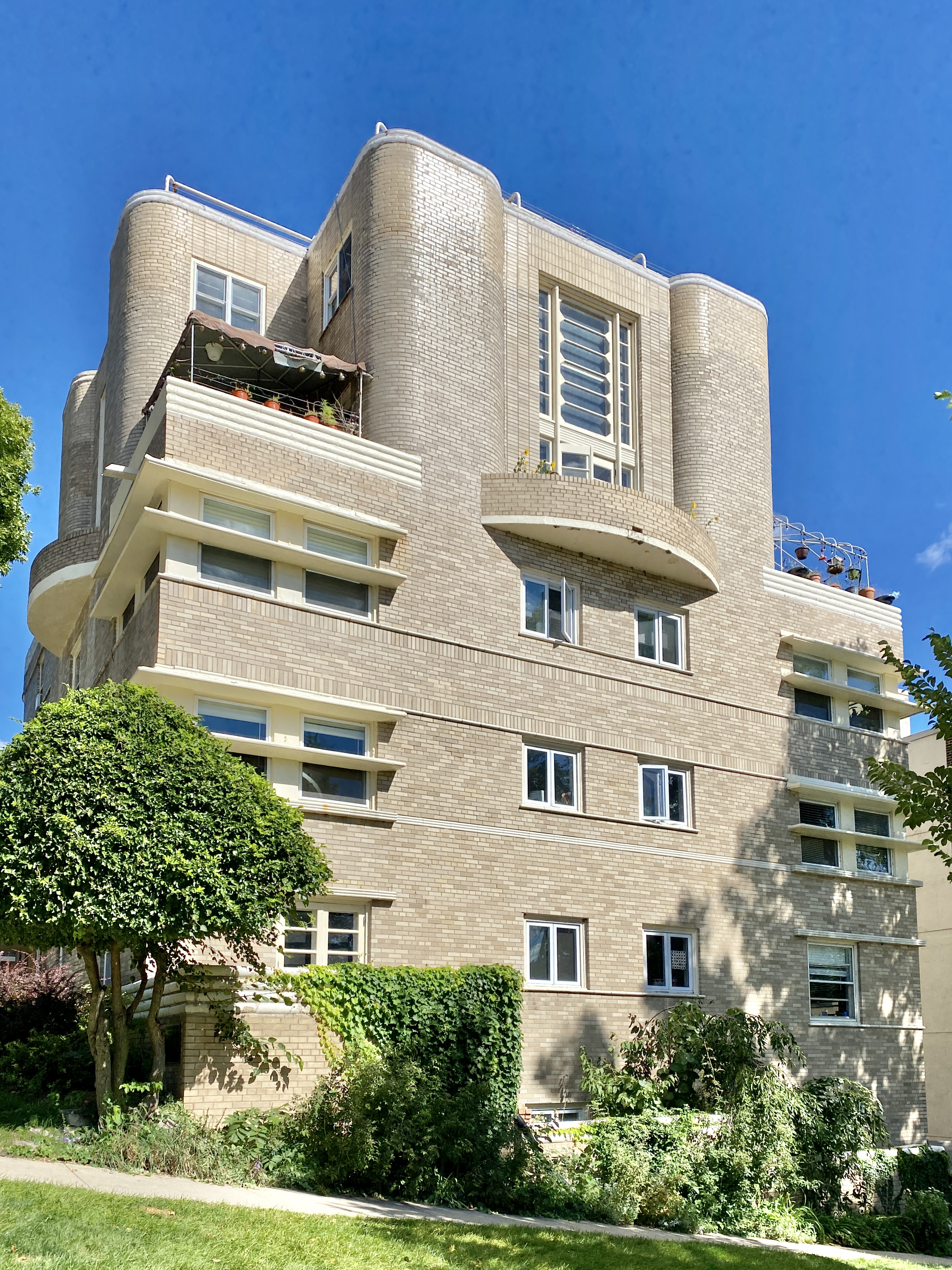

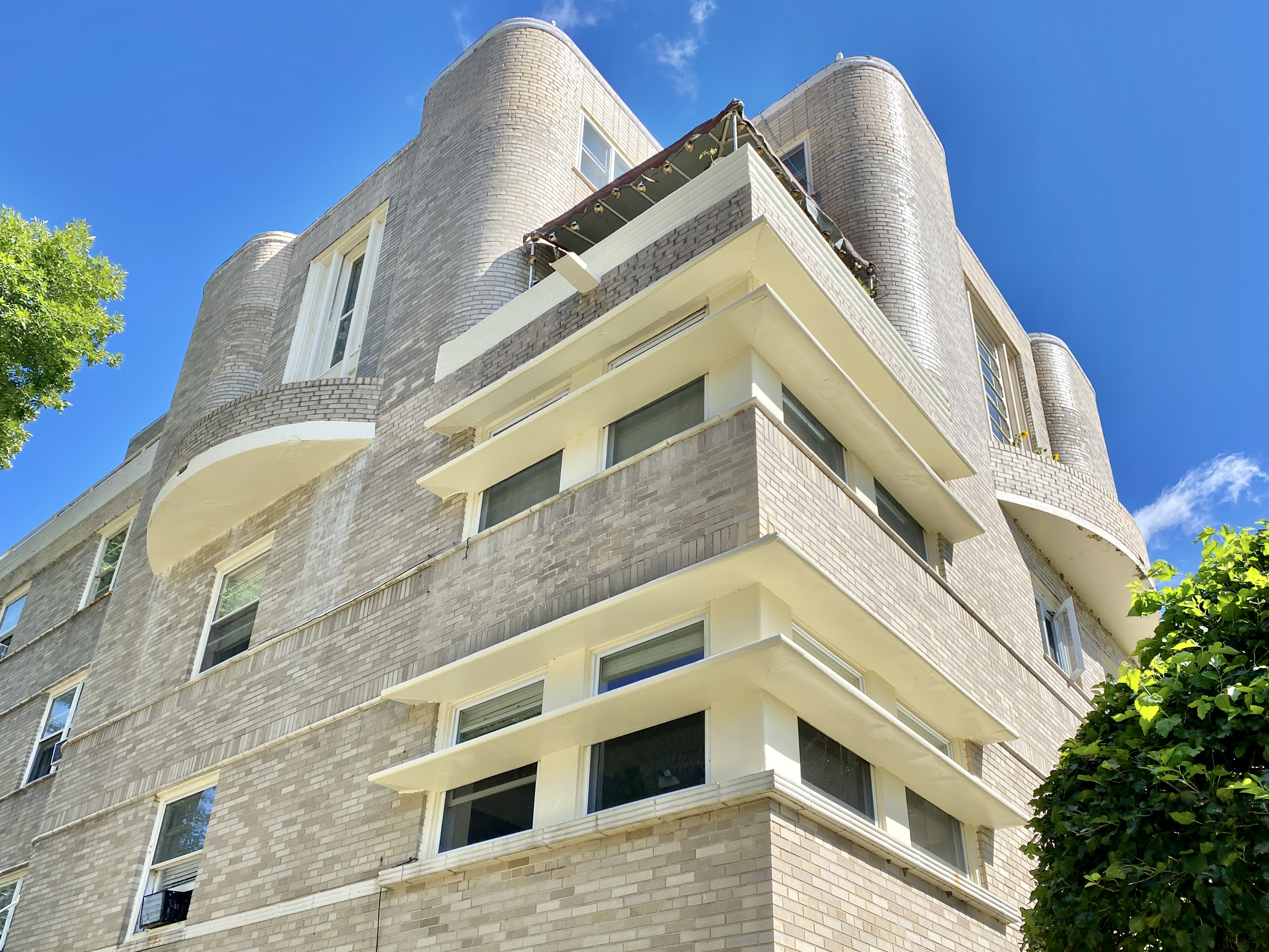

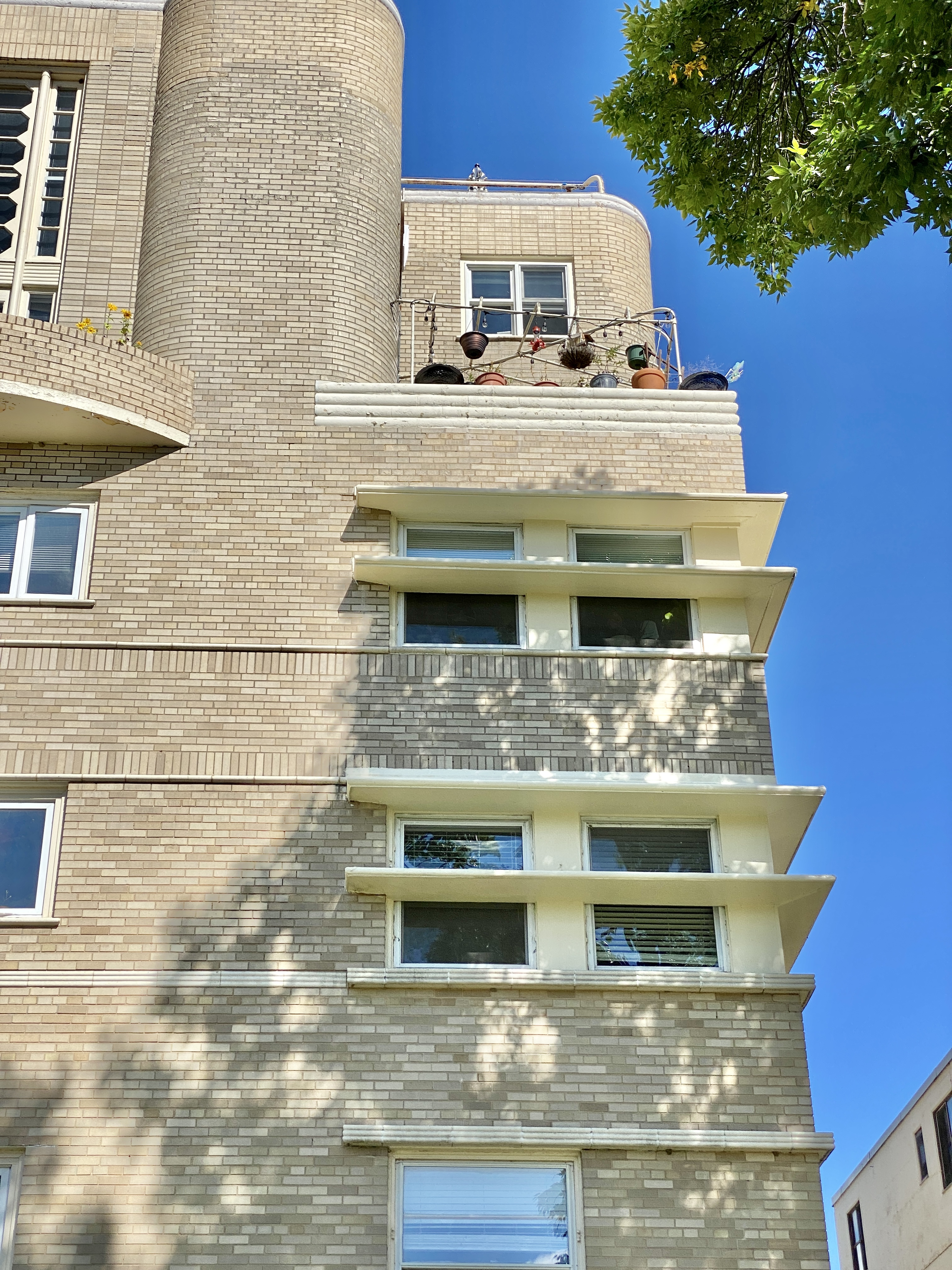

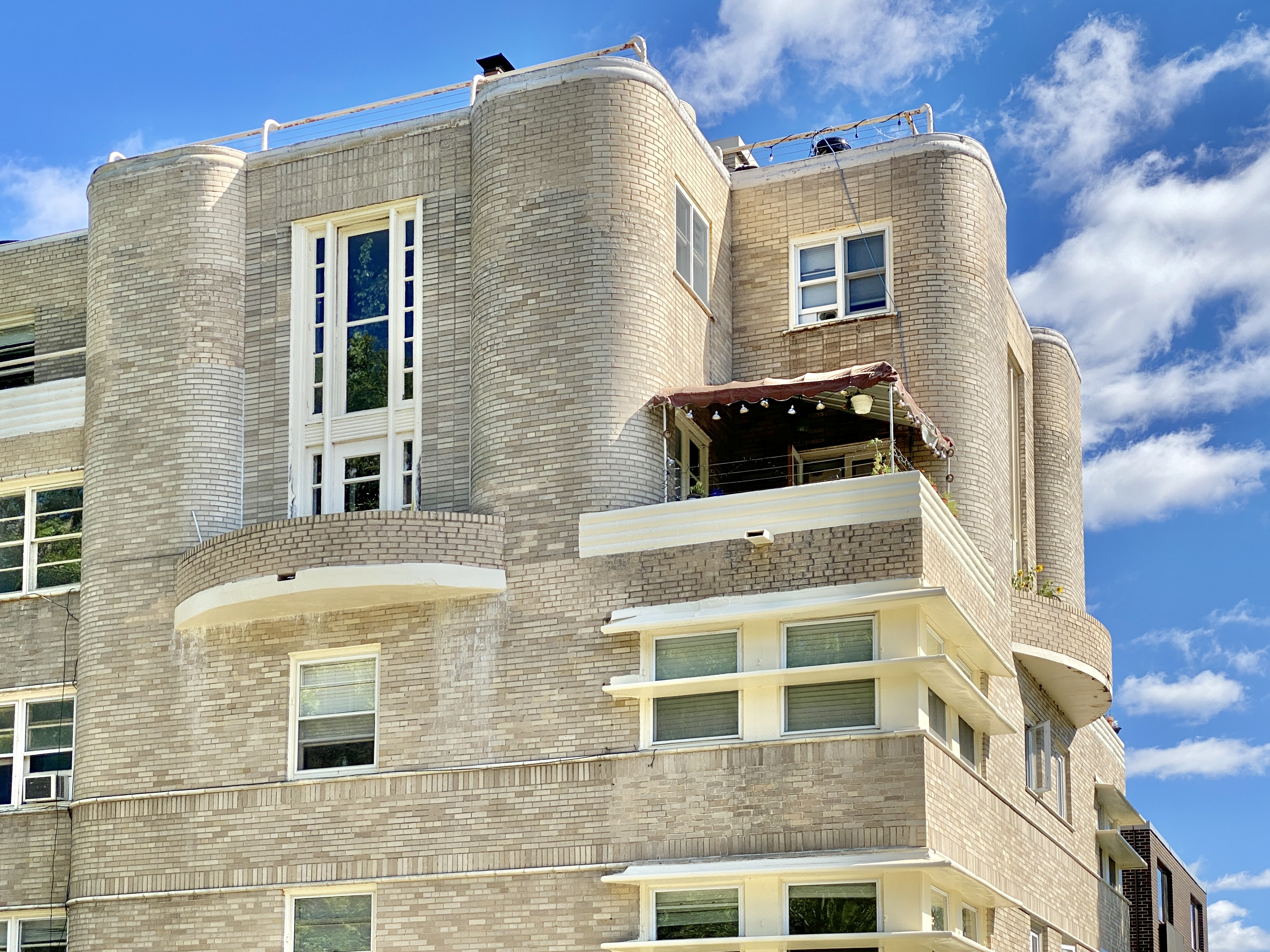

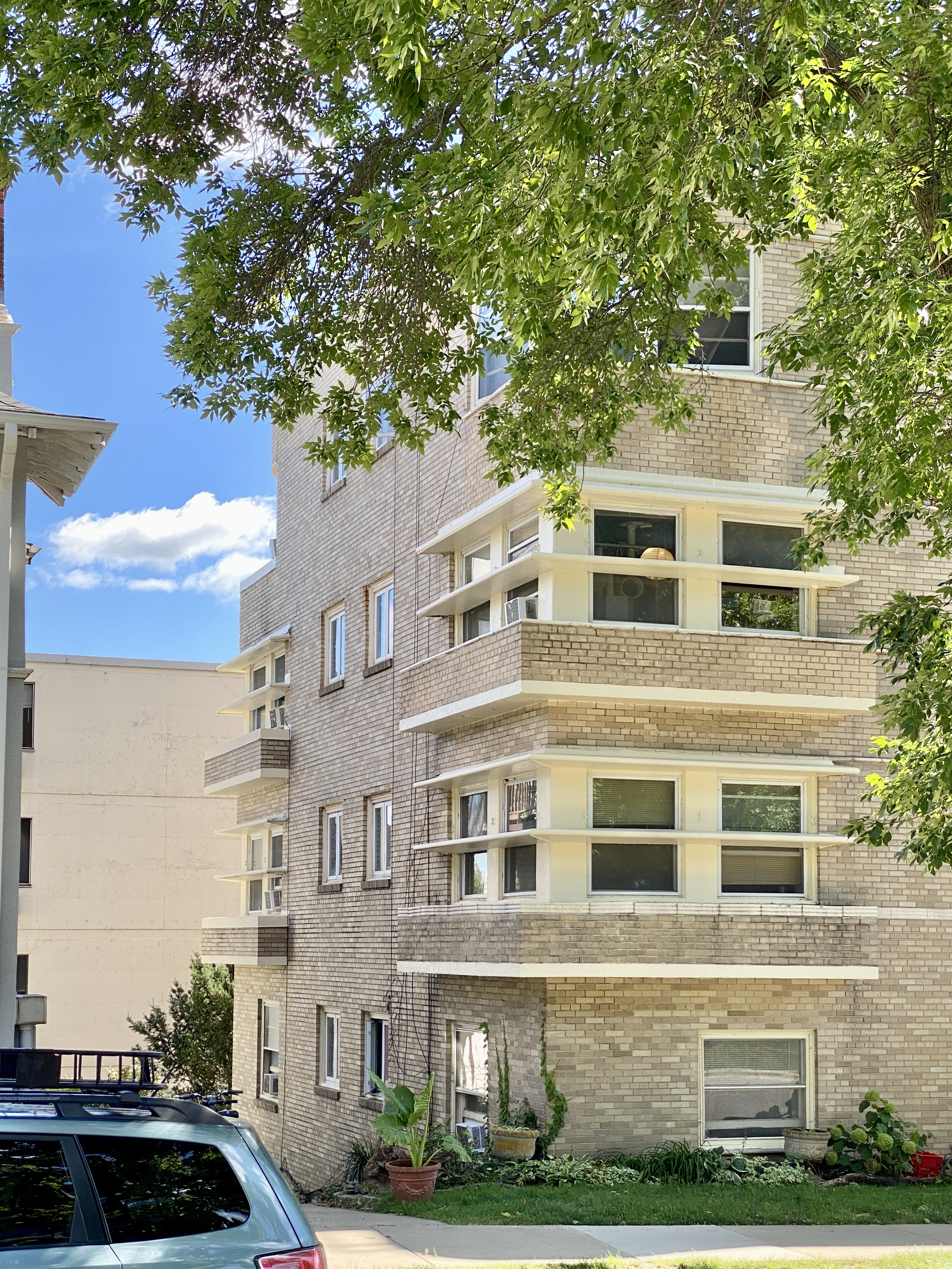

== Other related buildings ==
Dr. Quisling must have been pleased with his Towers apartment building because a decade later he hired Monberg to design two more buildings nearby in a similar style. In 1946 they built a new Quisling Clinic one block south of the Towers, also Streamline Moderne style with similar brick. In 1948 they built the Edgewater Hotel two blocks northwest of the Towers, overlooking Lake Mendota. All three buildings are in Mansion Hill Historic District, surrounded by other buildings - most in older styles.

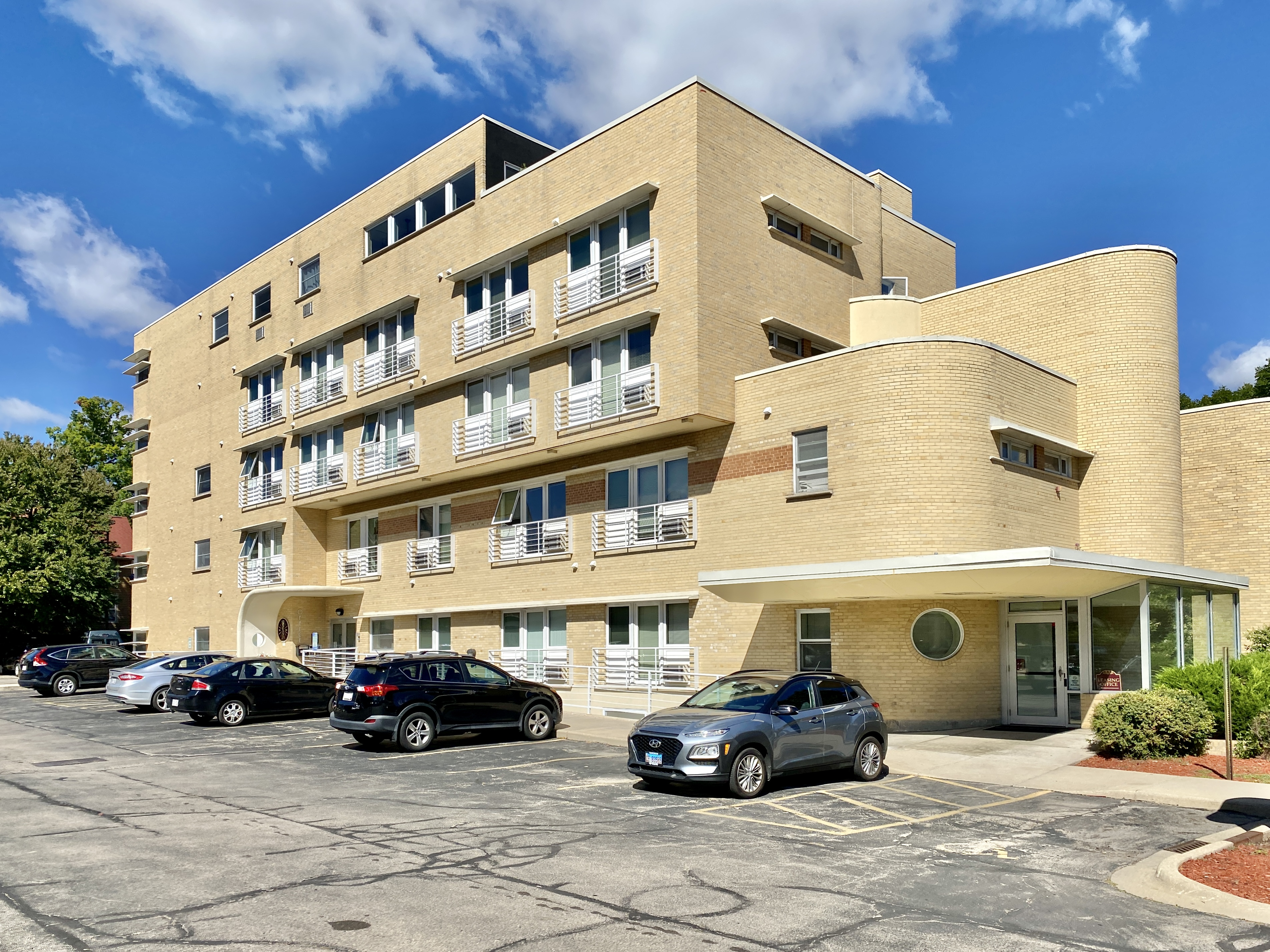
Quisling Clinic/Terrace, built 1946

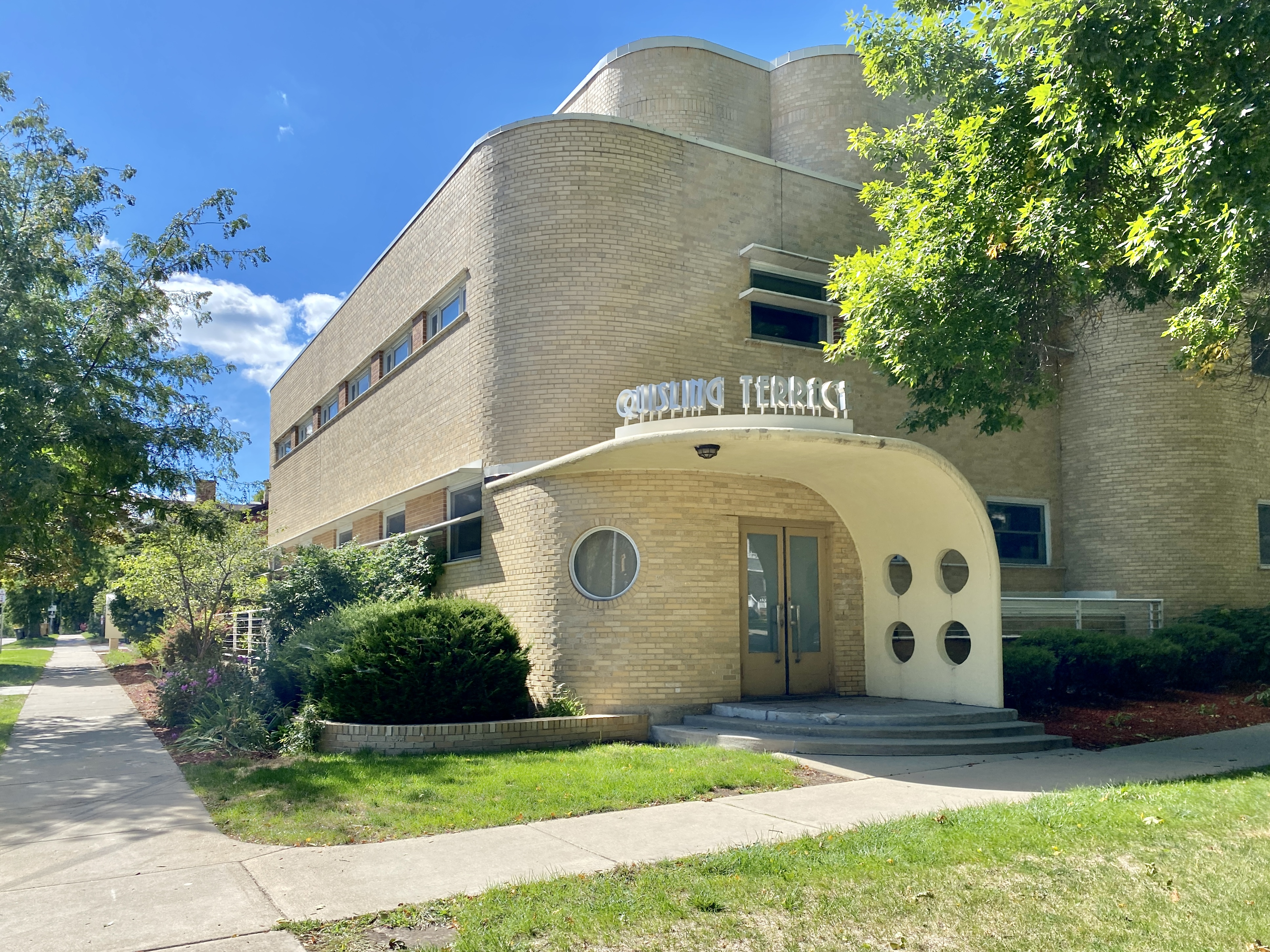
Another view of Clinic/Terrace

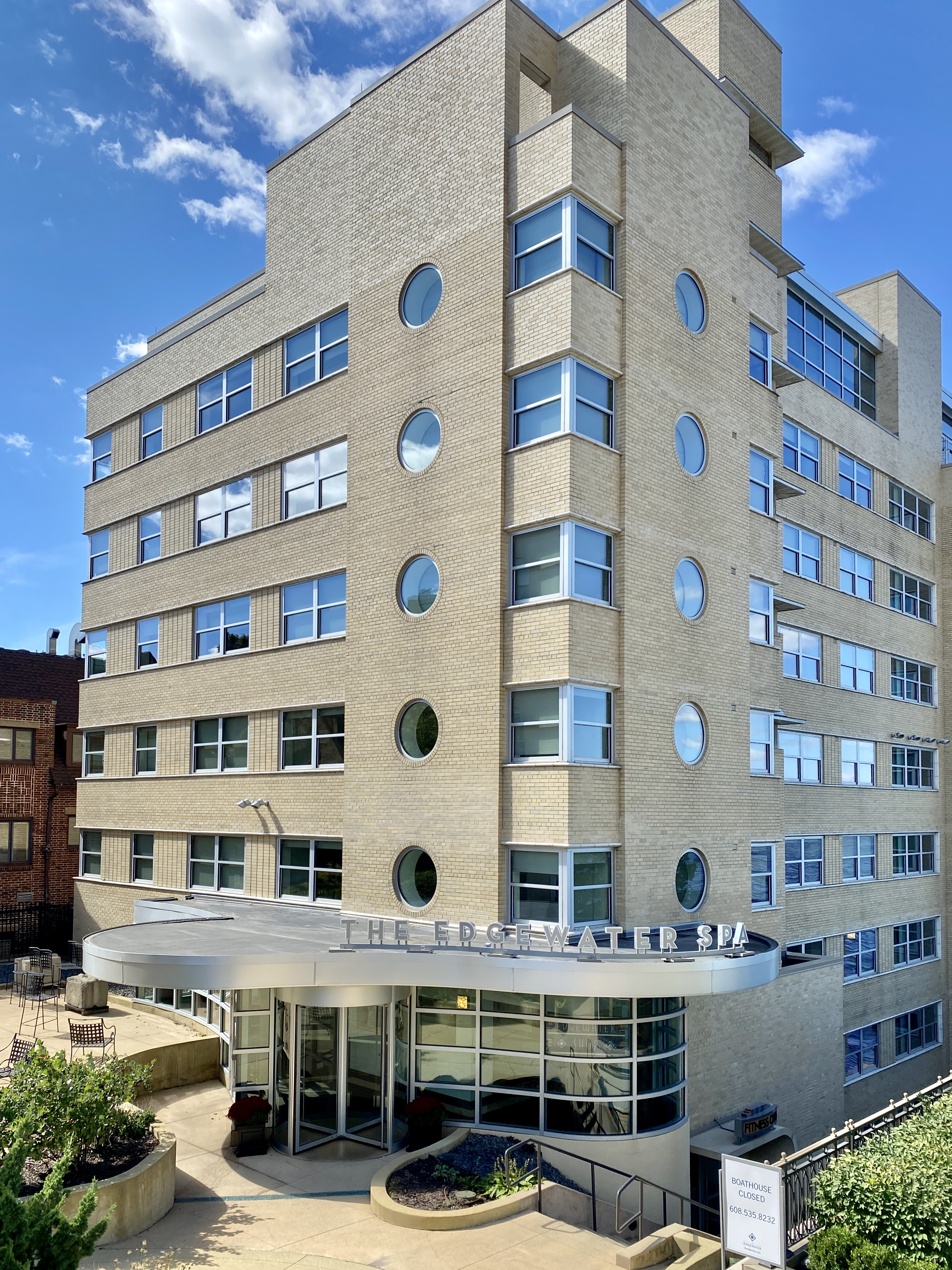
Edgewater Hotel, built 1948

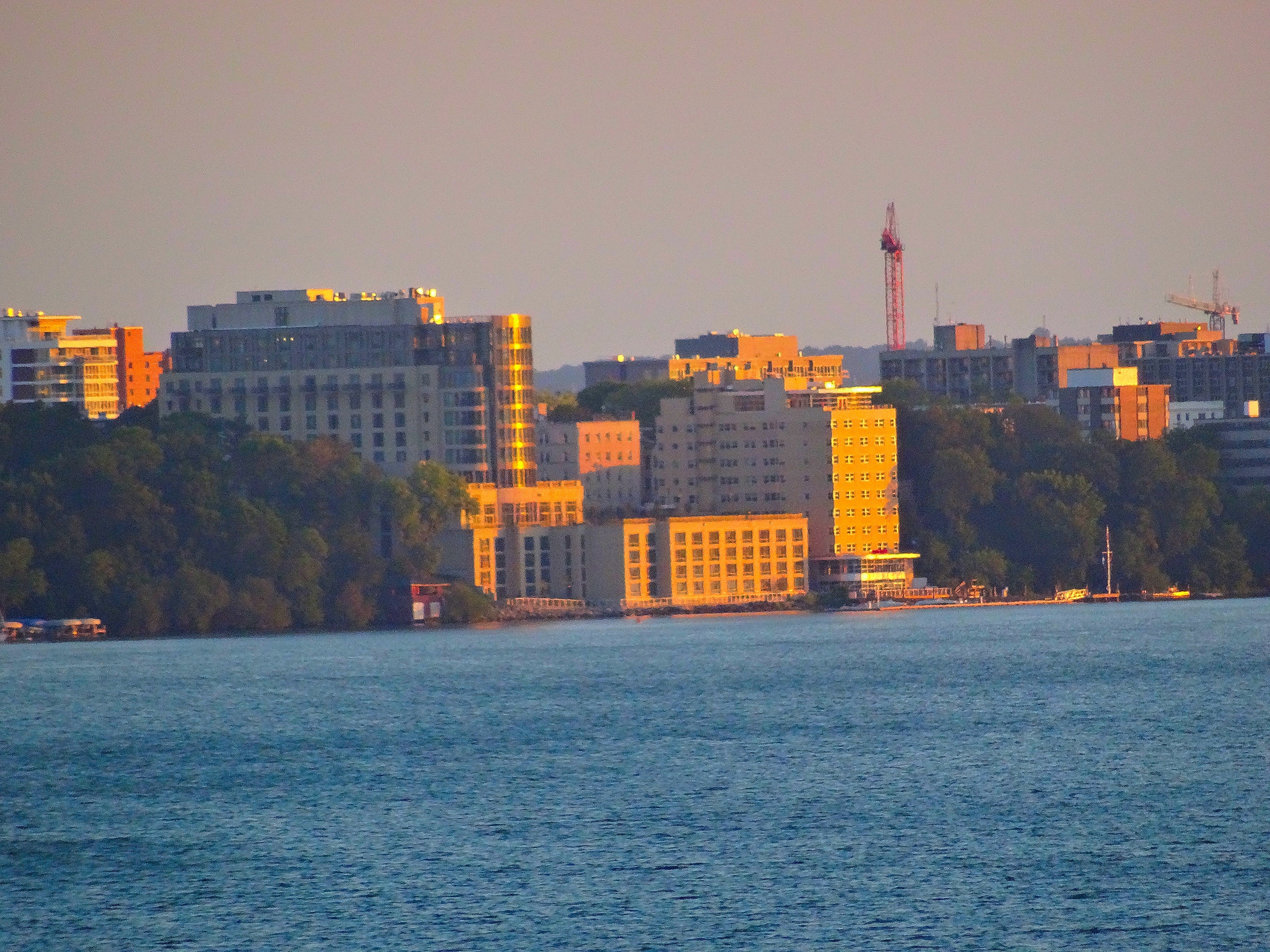
Edgewater viewed from Mendota
