= Michael Jackson (American soldier) =

American soldier

General Michael Jackson (18 December 1734 – 10 April 1801) was a soldier from Massachusetts.

== Early life ==
Jackson was born in Newton, Province of Massachusetts and served in the French and Indian War as a lieutenant. He married Ruth Parker, daughter of Ebenezer Parker, on January 31, 1759.

== American Revolution ==
In the American Revolutionary War he was captain of a minuteman company and took part in the final part of the Battles of Lexington and Concord, harassing the British retreat to Boston. He was wounded at the Battle of Bunker Hill. He served as the major of the Gardner's Regiment of the Massachusetts line from June 3, 1775 to December 31, 1775.

He was lieutenant colonel of the 16th Continental Infantry from January 1 to December 31, 1776. He was seriously wounded in the attack on Montresor's Island, New York on September 23, 1776.

He was promoted to colonel in the Massachusetts Line on January 1, 1777 and given command of the 8th Massachusetts Regiment the same date. He was transferred to the 3rd Massachusetts Regiment on June 12, 1783 and commanded it until it was mustered out of service later that year.

On September 30, 1783 he received a brevet (honorary promotion) to brigadier general and finished his country's service as a general under George Washington and the Continental Army on November 3, 1783. He was one of the very few individuals to have served in the Continental Army for the entirety of its existence - from its inception in June 1775 to its disbanding in November 1783.

Jackson was admitted as an original member of The Society of the Cincinnati in the state of Massachusetts when it was established in 1783.

He died in 1801 in Newton, Massachusetts.

== Family ==
His five brothers and five sons, including Michael Jackson Jr., also all served in the war. The family granted some farm lands in its possession to Harvard University to help found the institution.

After the Revolutionary War, some members of the famous, mostly doctors, Jackson family moved to Madison, WI, where they helped establish city institutions including Methodist Hospital and the Jackson Clinics, now Meriter Hospital and two of them married into the Hobbins family, which like them included doctors and surgeons, bank founders, and well known business leaders. Madison's Dr. William Joseph Hobbins served in the infamous Wisconsin Eagle Regiment as Maj Doctor Surgeon, with Step Son later Doctor Surgeon James A. Jackson (Dr. Will was also his step son Dr. Jim Jacksons's Medical Studies Preceptor at WI and also at NYU's Bellevue Medical School) as Regiment Hospital Steward. Dr.. Will's brother in law was GAR Federal Paymaster Colonel James Mears at the appt of Governor Randall and President Lincoln. Will's older brother Dr. Joseph Wm Hobbins served at Camp Randall as Wisconsin's Chief Doctor Surgeon in charge at Camp Randall mustering camp. 70 000 of Wisconsin's 90 000 Civil War fighting forces trained and were medically cleared for service through Camp Randall in Madison, WI. Towards the end of the War of the Rebellion in April and May 1864, a large CSA force surrendered to GAR troopers at Island 10 on the Mississippi River. Camp Randall was briefly converted into a makeshift prison camp, with the Confederates shipped up the Mississippi to the Wisconsin River, to Sauk City, and then by rail to Madison. Dr. Jos Wm Hobbins was then tasked with treating the arriving 1400 Confederate soldiers, about 200 of whom were seriously ill from pneumonia, 65 of whom died and are buried at Forest Hill Natl Cemetery in Madison. Dr.Joseph Wm Hobbins and brother Dr.. Wm Jos Hobbins were trained Royal Doctors of Great Britain and were advanced in sterilization techniques and sanitary advances coming from the Royal Medical Academys from which they received their Royal medical training and certifications. These advances were implemented in the Civil War, and well before from British Medical advances in Croatia and other earlier British combat battlefield experiences predating the War of the Rebellion. These two men sought to establish, and did establish with the help of Dr. Will Hobbins' efforts to train his step son Dr. James Albert Jackson to become a famed Doctor Surgeon in WI and Bellevue at NYU University of Wisconsin's first medical college (a 1st effort that failed), founded the Wisconsin Horticulture Society and Madison Literary Club, President and Doctor Surgeons founding Wisconsin's St George's Society under charter approved by the Wisconsin Legislature. Other Hobbins' offspring founded many of the state capital's first banks, such as the American Exchange Bank (1st German Bank (Fred Suhr) merger) with many preserved historic family homes on Mansion Hill. James R Hobbins, son of Mary and Joseph W. Hobbins traveled to Butte, MT with his nephew John Suhr Hobbins who married a local girl, Margaret Perham, and return to Madison as 1st Cashier at the American Exchange Bank, later to become Vice President with older brother Wm Suhr Hobbins as President. James H. Hobbins started as post hole digger for Anaconda and later became CEO of the corporation, CEO of Union Pacific Railroad and sit on the Board of Governors for the New York Federal Reserve. In the early 1900s, Mary (Mears) Hobbins (married Joseph William Hobbins son of Will Hobbins) promoted, fought for, raised funds and founded the city's first hospital Madison General Hospital, and founded the Badger Chapter of the American Red Cross.

A book detailing the Jackson Hobbins blood lines, 300 Years American, by Alice F. and Bettina Jackson chronicles some of these sons and daughters of the American Revolution dating from Jamestown to the 1950s.
