= Joseph G. Thorp =

American politician

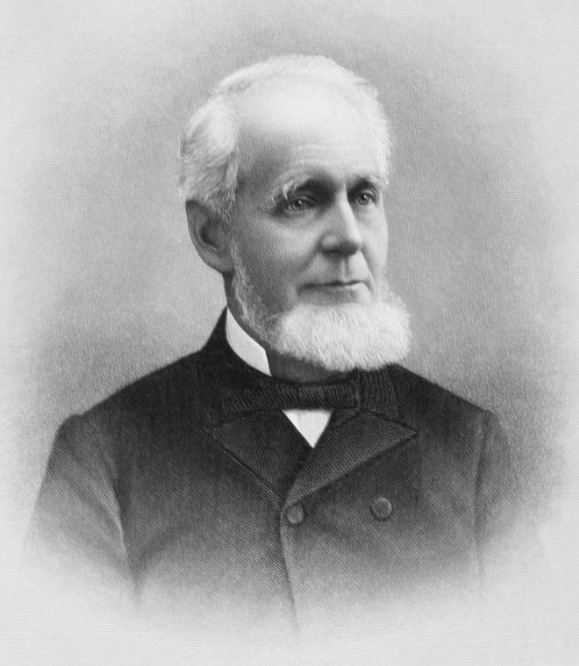

Member of the Wisconsin State Senate
- In office 1872–1873
- Constituency: 30th District

Member of the Wisconsin State Senate
- In office 1866–1867
- Constituency: 32nd District

Personal details
- Born: Joseph Gilbert Thorp; April 28, 1812 Butternuts, New York, US
- Died: January 13, 1895 (aged 82) Cambridge, Massachusetts, US
- Party: Republican
- Occupation: Businessman, politician

Joseph Gilbert Thorp (April 28, 1812 – January 13, 1895) was a millionaire lumber baron and a member of the Wisconsin State Senate.

== Biography ==
Thorp was born on April 28, 1812, in Butternuts, New York. Later, he moved to Eau Claire, Wisconsin. He died in Cambridge, Massachusetts, in 1895. The daughter of Joseph G. and Susan Amelia Thorp, Sara Chapman Bull, was married to the world-famous violinist Ole Bull in a lavish wedding in his Madison mansion. His son, Joseph G. Thorp Jr., was married to a daughter of Henry Wadsworth Longfellow. Thorp, Wisconsin was named after him.

== Senate career ==
Thorp represented the 32nd District of the Senate from 1866 to 1867 and the 30th District from 1872 to 1873. He was a Republican.
