= The Edgewater (Madison, Wisconsin) =

Historic place in Wisconsin, United States

- U.S. Historic district – Contributing property
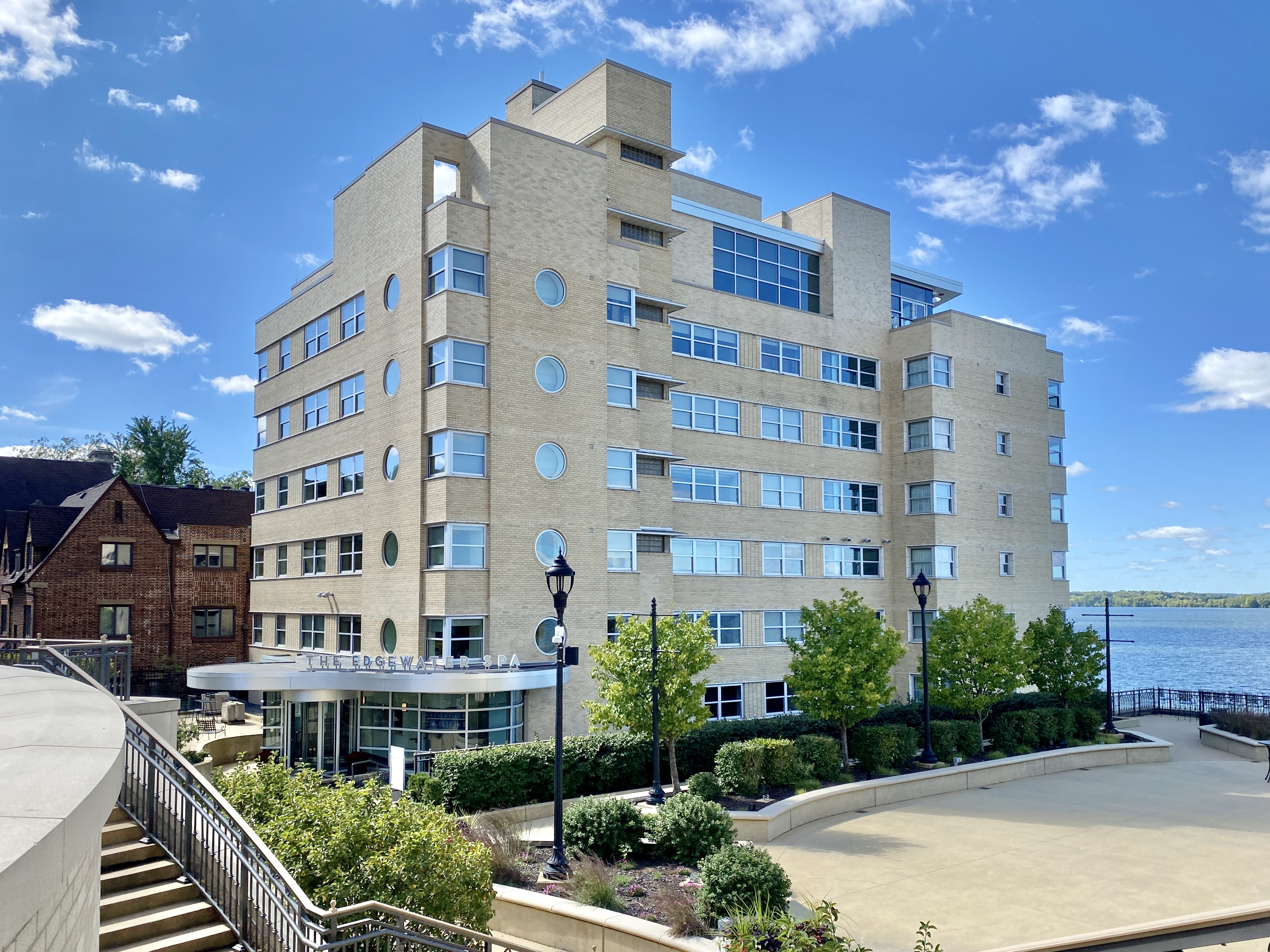
- The Original Edgewater Hotel (the Langdon Building)

- Location within Wisconsin Location within the United States
- Location: 642 Wisconsin Avenue, Madison, Wisconsin
- Coordinates: 43°04′45.2″N 89°23′24.2″W
- Architect: Lawrence Monberg
- Architectural style: Art Moderne
- Part of: Mansion Hill Historic District (ID97000552)
- Designated CP: June 4, 1997

The Edgewater is a historic hotel on the shore of Lake Mendota in Madison, Wisconsin, near the University of Wisconsin–Madison and the Wisconsin State Capitol. Originally constructed between 1946 and 1948 as the Edgewater Apartments and Hotel, the property developed into a popular destination for entertainers and visiting celebrities in the late 1940s. It was expanded in 1973 and underwent a major redevelopment completed in 2014. In 2015, the hotel was inducted into Historic Hotels of America, a program of the National Trust for Historic Preservation. The original building, designed by architect Lawrence Monberg in the Art Moderne style, is a contributing property in the Mansion Hill Historic District, which was added to the National Register of Historic Places in 1997.

The Edgewater has held an AAA Four Diamond rating since 2015 and was the only hotel in Madison or Dane County to receive the designation in AAA's 2025 listings. The hotel was also ranked sixth among hotels in the Midwest in Condé Nast Traveler's Readers' Choice Awards. As of 2026, the hotel consists of:

- Langdon Building — the original 1948 hotel.
- Wisconsin Building — the newer hotel tower.
- Grand Plaza — the outdoor gathering area between the buildings, which becomes an ice-skating rink in winter.
- Lake Mendota waterfront — four floors of hotel rooms underneath the Grand Plaza, including the Boathouse restaurant and pier.

The Langdon and Wisconsin buildings are connected by an enclosed passageway.

== History ==
=== Original construction and architecture ===
The Edgewater began as a family-owned business when a group of Madison physicians needed better accommodations for patients visiting the neighboring Quisling Clinic. The Quisling brothers purchased the land, and hired Danish-born Lawrence Monberg to design the building in the 1930s, when the Streamline Moderne variant of Art Moderne architecture, characterized by horizontal lines, smooth wall surfaces, and streamlined forms, was still en vogue. Construction did not begin until 1941 and was delayed further by the Second World War. According to author Bobby Tanzilo, the structure was already out of style when it was built. It was called the "Edgewater Apartments and Hotel" , constructed between 1946 and 1948 on Wisconsin Avenue, overlooking Lake Mendota.

The Edgewater is one of three notable examples of this type of architecture in the Mansion Hill Historic District that comprises about 17 blocks bounded by Lake Mendota. The others are the Quisling Towers Apartments (1937) and the Quisling Clinic (1945). The Edgewater's distinctive architectural features include horizontal bands of windows, continuous sills and lintels, corner windows, and parapets emphasizing the building's horizontal profile.

=== Expansion and redevelopment ===
Edgewater Hotel, (the Wisconsin Building) in 2026, showing 2014 addition

An addition constructed in 1973 substantially expanded the original hotel. Directly beneath the Edgewater's Grand Plaza are four floors of hotel guest rooms, retained from the hotel's 1970s addition. This is an unusual feature of the property: the outdoor plaza and winter skating rink effectively form the roof of an occupied section of the hotel.

Plans for a major redevelopment emerged in 2009, proposing restoration of the original hotel, construction of a new tower adjacent to it, and creation of a landscaped public plaza between them with access to Lake Mendota. The redevelopment, designed by Elkus Manfredi Architects, was reported as a $98 million project, with $16 million in financial support proposed from the City of Madison. The new tower did not attempt to mimic the style of the older building, opting for a modern look with historical references to the Mansion Hill architectural landmarks in the neighborhood. Architecture critic Whitney Gould questioned aspects of the proposed design, and expressed concern about the treatment of the public plaza. The Edgewater reopened in September 2014 to generally positive reviews. The completed hotel received favorable coverage for its combination of historic architecture and modern accommodations. Its design later attracted criticism for its relationship to the historic building. Critics said the addition gutted the deco charm inside and "left the Edgewater an mere shadow of it original glory."

=== Notable guests and entertainment ===
The Edgewater Hotel became a popular destination for entertainers and celebrities during the management of Augie Faulkner, who had previously worked at Chicago's Drake Hotel. Faulkner would eventually purchase the hotel (1966). Beginning in the late 1940s, the hotel hosted performances by nationally known big bands, including those led by Jimmy Dorsey and Ralph Flanagan. Concerts were held on the hotel's rooftop, and some performances were recorded and broadcast over the radio.

Among the hotel's notable guests were Elvis Presley, Johnny Cash, Bob Dylan, Bob Marley, Sammy Davis Jr., John Mellencamp, and actor Bob Denver. Presley reportedly reserved two entire floors during his stay. Other guests have included Elton John, Bob Hope, Liberace, Joni Mitchell, Kurt Cobain, and Harry Connick Jr. The hotel has also accommodated international dignitaries, including Indian prime ministers Jawaharlal Nehru and Indira Gandhi, and the 14th Dalai Lama.

=== Parking ===
The redevelopment included a new underground parking garage adjacent to the hotel and renovation of the existing parking facility built during the 1970s expansion. The two garages were connected by an underground vehicular tunnel, while pedestrian connections provided access to the hotel. The project also included a landscaped public plaza above the existing parking structure.

=== Ice skating ===
In November 2014, a 4,000-square-foot outdoor ice-skating rink was built on the premises at the public plaza overlooking the lake. The hotel featured ice skating activity as far back as 1949, when it cleared an area on Lake Mendota for skating directly on the frozen lake. A January 1949 photograph has been preserved by the Wisconsin Historical Society which documents hockey players on ice at the site bordered by evergreen trees.
