= Old Executive Mansion =

- U.S. National Register of Historic Places
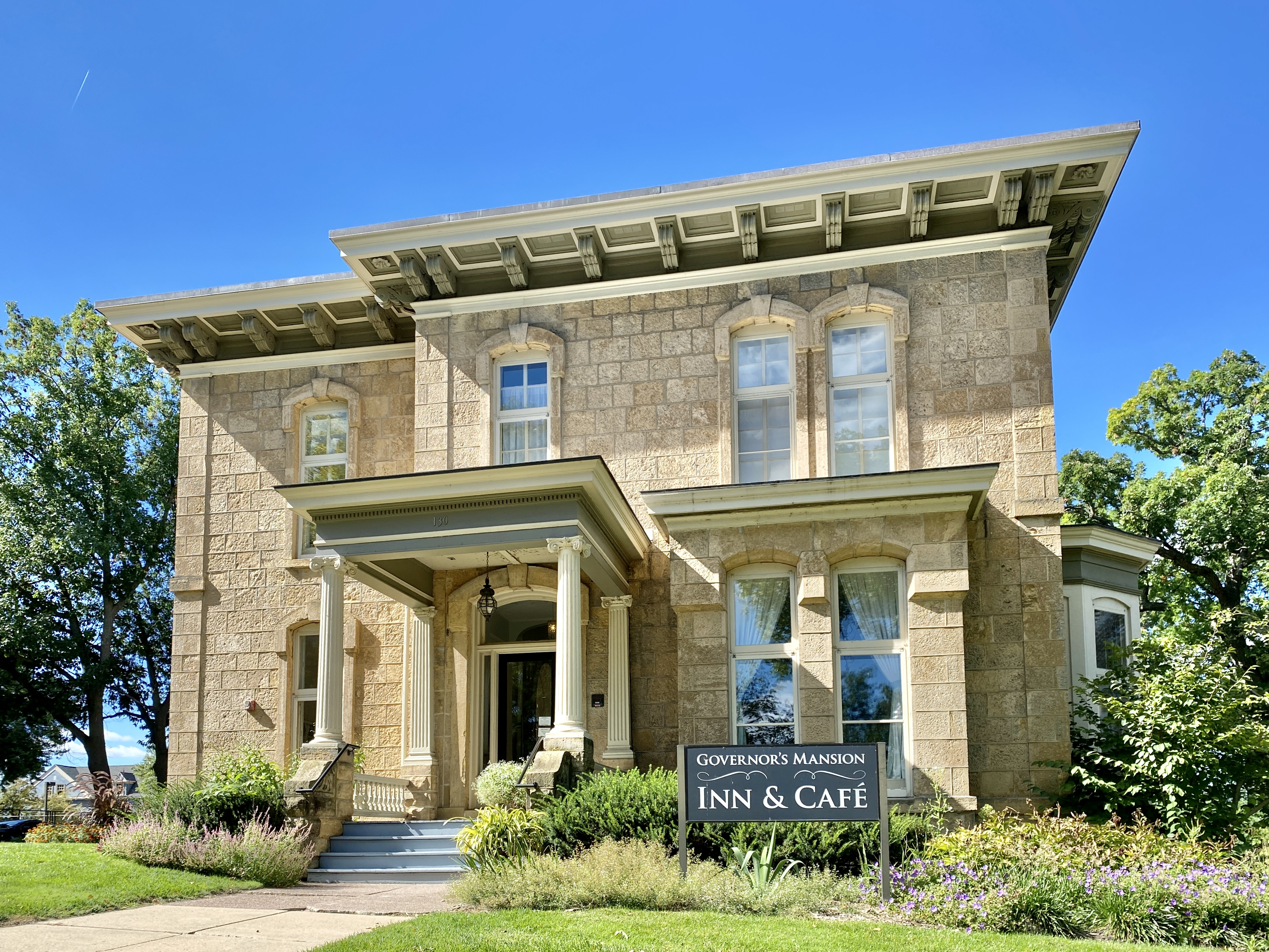
- Old Executive Mansion

- Location within Wisconsin Location within the United States
- Interactive map showing the location of Old Executive Mansion, Wisconsin
- Location: 130 E. Gilman St. Madison, Wisconsin
- Coordinates: 43.07978°N 89.38684°W
- Built: c. 1854–56
- Architectural style: Italianate
- Website: governorsmansioninn.com
- Part of: Mansion Hill Historic District
- NRHP reference No.: 73000078
- Added to NRHP: April 11, 1973

Wisconsin's Old Executive Residence, known better as the Old Governor's Mansion, is located at 130 East Gilman Street in the Mansion Hill Historic District of Madison, Wisconsin, on the southern shore of Lake Mendota. Constructed of local sandstone sometime around 1854–56, it served as the official residence of the governor of Wisconsin from 1883 to 1950.

In 1973 the mansion was added to the National Register of Historic Places. After serving for several decades as a university residence, it has been adaptively reopened since August 2019 as a boutique hotel named Governor's Mansion Inn.

== History ==
The house was built in 1856 for Catherine and Julius T. White, Secretary of the Wisconsin Insurance Company. The style is Italianate-influenced, showing in the low-pitched hip roof, the broad eaves supported by brackets, and the hood moulds over the windows. The exterior is clad in sandstone quarried at Westport, across Lake Mendota. The house originally had a small front porch, which was replaced around 1898 with a wraparound porch across the whole front and the southwest side. That second porch was replaced with the current small one.

The Whites were art collectors and social movers, but after only a few years, in 1857, they sold the house to George and Emily Delaplaine. One of Madison's first settlers, Delaplaine had been secretary to Governors Farwell and Dewey, and co-owned a large real estate development firm. The Delaplaines were also hosts, and the house was known for fancy parties under both owners.

In 1867 the house was bought by Joseph G. Thorp, a millionaire lumber baron, and his wife Amelia. Thorp was a New Yorker who came to Wisconsin in 1856 and made his fortune with his Eau Claire Lumber company. But Amelia was not satisfied with Eau Claire society, so in 1868 Joseph bought her this mansion in Madison, where she could entertain and impress. "In 1870, the Thorps' young daughter, Sara, married Ole Bull, the world-famous 60-year-old Norwegian violinist in one of the most lavish weddings the town had ever seen." Bull treated the Thorp's house in Madison as his home in the U.S. and made changes to the grounds to suit his cosmopolitan taste, converting the slope toward the lake into a formal terraced garden.

In 1883 Governor Jeremiah McLain Rusk bought the mansion for $15,000. Two years later he sold it to the state and it became the official residence of the governor. All governors lived there until 1950, when the state acquired the far larger Carl Johnson mansion in nearby Maple Bluff to serve as the Wisconsin Governor's Mansion.

In 1951, the building was repurposed as a residential unit for the University of Wisconsin–Madison. Renamed Knapp House in honor of Kemper K. Knapp, it housed graduate students for more than 50 years. In 2016, it was sold as state surplus property to Bob Klebba and David Waugh, who renovated and redeveloped it as a boutique hotel.
