= Mansion Hill Historic District (Madison, Wisconsin) =

Historic district in Wisconsin, United States

- U.S. National Register of Historic Places
- U.S. Historic district
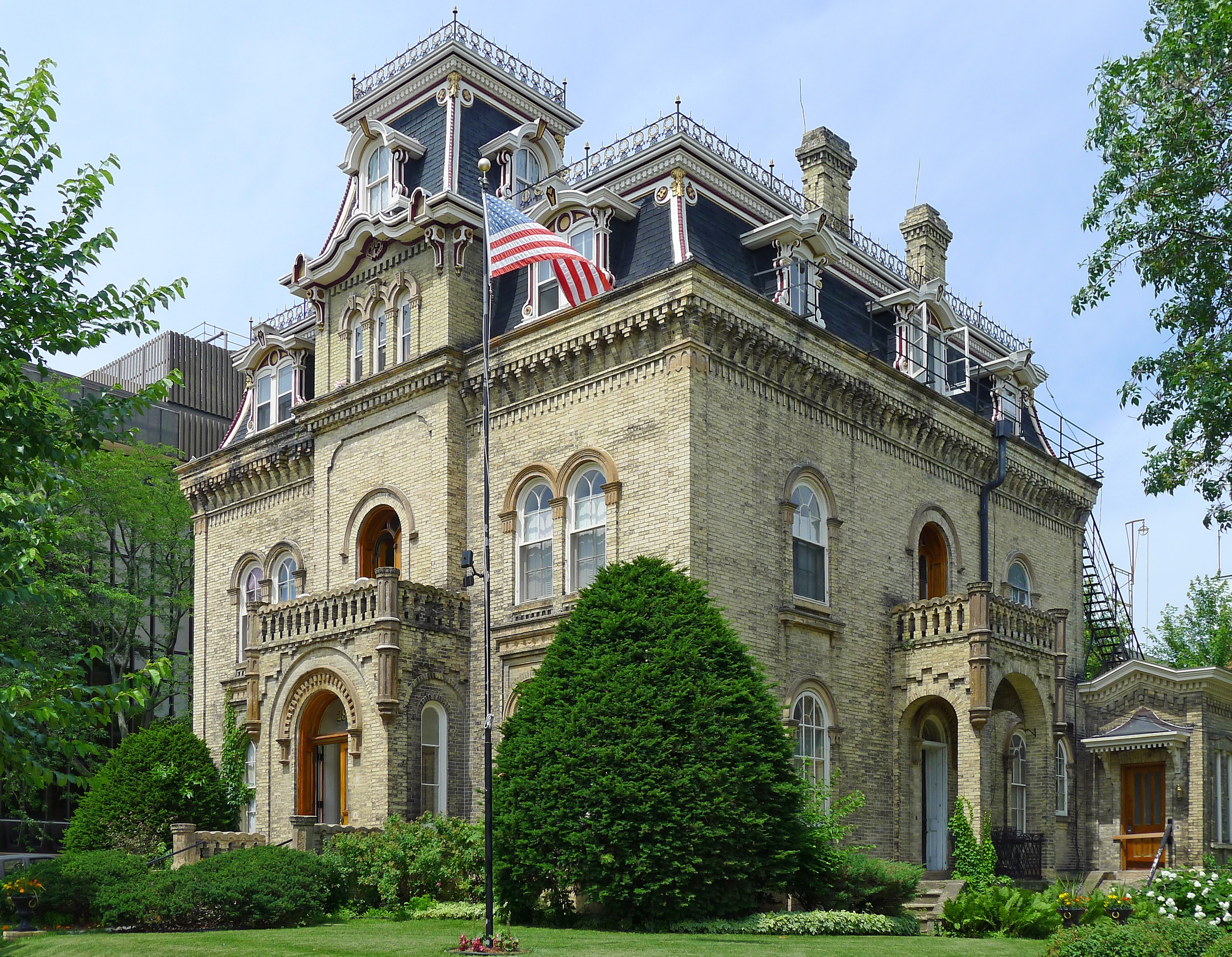
- Van Slyke / Keenan House (1858, architect August Kutzbock; modified 1870)

- Location within Wisconsin Location within the United States
- Location: Roughly bounded by E. Dayton, E. Johnson, E. Gorham, N. Butler, Langdon, and W. Gilman Sts., and Lake Mendota, Madison, Wisconsin
- Coordinates: 43°4′39″N 89°23′17″W
- Area: 49 acres (20 ha)
- Architect: Claude & Starck, Conover and Porter, et al.
- Architectural style: Italianate, Victorian, Arts and Crafts, etc.
- NRHP reference No.: 97000552
- Added to NRHP: June 4, 1997

The Mansion Hill Historic District encompasses a part of the Mansion Hill neighborhood northwest of the capitol square in Madison, Wisconsin. In the 19th century the district was home to much of Madison's upper class, and held the largest concentration of large, ornate residences in the city, but in the 20th century it shifted to student housing. In 1997 the district was added to the National Register of Historic Places.

== History of the district ==
Madison was surveyed in 1836 and incorporated as a village in 1846. Initial construction was mostly near the capitol square and King Street, while the hill that would become Mansion Hill remained undeveloped forest. In 1846 J.T. Clark built a wooden house in that forest - no longer extant. Then in 1851 Judge Levi B. Vilas built a stylish sandstone house at 521 North Henry Street and Jeremiah T. Marston built a similar house across the street at 520 N Henry. These two fine homes no longer exist, but others followed, and some from the 1850s do survive. The city's population had grown to 6,864 by 1856, but growth slowed during the Civil War.

By 1870 large stylish houses flanked Gilman Street from North Butler to North Park Streets. Many on the northwest side of Gilman sat on large lots that reached down to Lake Mendota. Southeast of Gilman, smaller houses stood on smaller lots - many in fine Greek Revival and Italianate style.

The neighborhood saw another construction boom starting in the 1880s. Along with growth at the UW and state government, Madison was adding some manufacturing to its economy with concerns like Fuller and Johnson, which made farm implements. Queen Anne style began to overtake the Italianate which had been popular. As styles changed, some of the old-fashioned houses from the 1850s and 60s were replaced by Queen Anne homes, and the large lots were subdivided to make sites for more homes.

Starting in the 1880s some houses were built for rental, followed by duplexes and other rental properties. From 1910 to 1950 demographics changed as demand for student housing prompted the construction of rooming houses and apartment buildings in the neighborhood. The UW population was growing and the university provided on-campus housing only for women. With the influx of students into the neighborhood, many families gradually left for the newly popular suburbs, and some of their old mansions were remodeled into multi-unit housing.

From the 1950s to the 1970s, a number of old houses in the district were demolished to make way for new buildings. In response, residents petitioned the city to have the district designated a landmark and protect its history. The district became a city landmark in 1976, officially becoming Madison's first historic district.

Of the 161 contributing buildings, 44 were built prior to 1880, a further 78 were built through 1910. Half of the buildings are in the Italianate and Queen Anne styles, 16 other styles are also represented. Several of the buildings in the district are also individually listed on the historic register.

== Example houses in the district ==
Here are some good examples of different architectural styles present in the district, in roughly the order built:

=== Greek Revival ===
The Nye House at 115 E. Johnson Street is a Greek Revival-style house built in 1857, with the relatively low-pitched roof, the simple window treatment, and the cornice returns typical of the style.

=== Italianate style ===
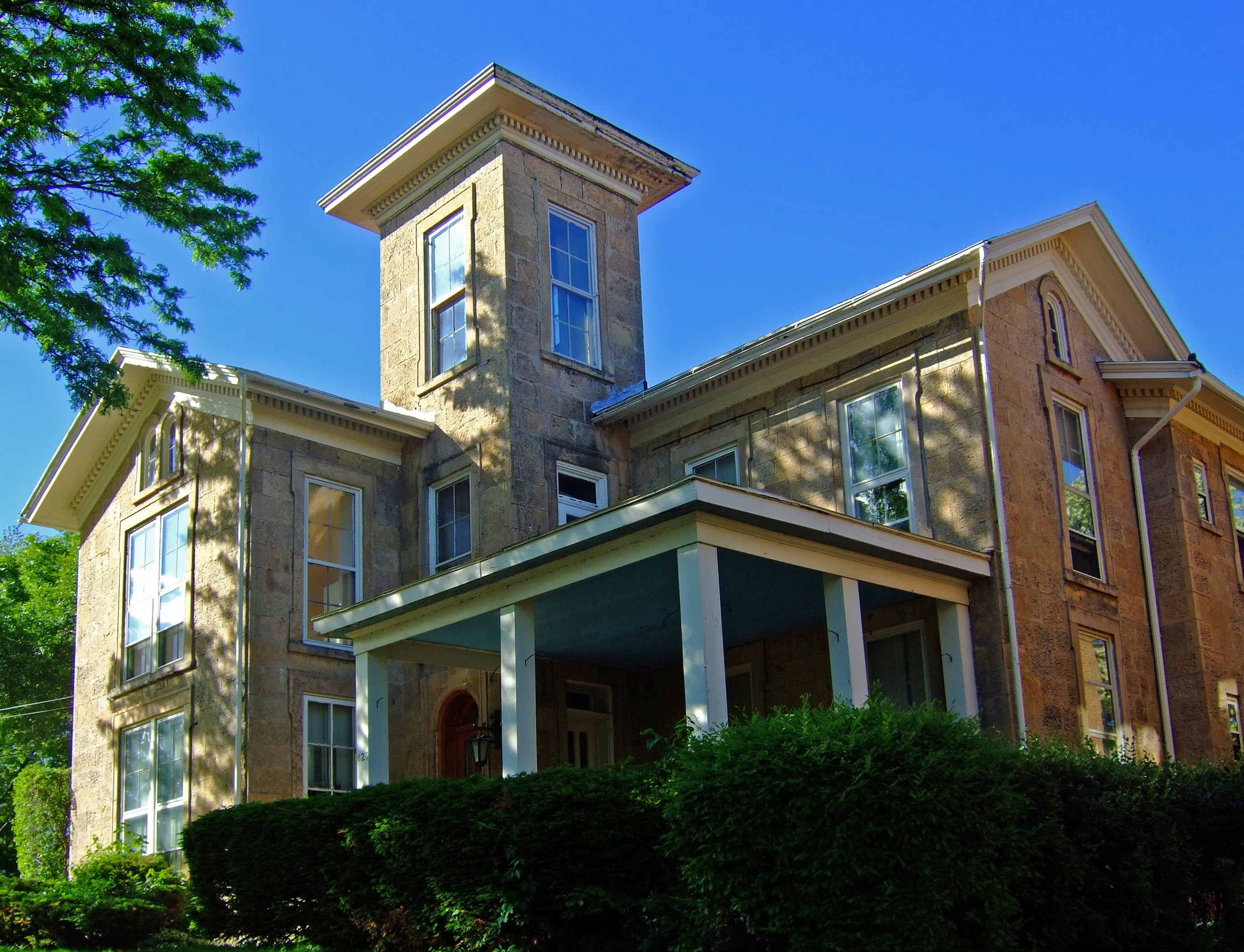
Lawrence / Bashford House, Italian Villa style, 1857

- The Fox / Van Slyke House at 510 N. Carroll Street is an Italianate-style residence, designed by Samuel Donnel and August Kutzbock and built 1856-58. Italianate features of this house include the low-pitched roof with broad eaves supported by paired, ornate brackets, and the decorative framing around the windows. The walls are clad in local sandstone, laid in a German masonry style where large and small blocks alternate. This house also has corner pilasters, dentil trim, and ornate chimneys that echo the shape of the house itself. The house was built for Samuel Fox, a hardware dealer, and his wife Lorain. After a year they sold it to Napoleon Bonaparte Van Slyke and his wife Annie. Van Slyke was then cashier for the Dane County Bank and a regent of the UW. He was also involved in building the first city hall, establishing Forest Hill cemetery, and some questionable financial maneuvers.
- The Old Executive Mansion at 130 E. Gilman Street is another notable example of Italianate style in the district, built 1854 to 1856.
- The Lawrence / Bashford House at 423 N. Pinckney Street is an Italian Villa-style house, with a low-pitched roof, elegant frieze and cornice, and a 3-story tower, all clad in local sandstone. It was built in 1857 for banker H.K. Lawrence, then occupied by Morris and Anna Fuller who distributed farm implements, then occupied by their daughter and son-in-law, Robert Bashford, who served as city attorney, mayor, state senator, and Wisconsin Supreme Court justice.
- The Daniels House at 515 N. Carroll Street is an Italianate-styled house built in 1872, but clad in wood.

=== Romanesque Revival ===
The hallmark of Romanesque Revival style is the round-topped arches above window and door openings, as opposed to square tops or pointed arches.

- The Pierce / McDonnell House at 424 N. Pinckney Street was built 1857 to 1858, designed by Kutzbock and Donnel, Madison's first architectural firm, in Rundbogenstil ("round-arch style"). The German immigrant August Kutzbock had been schooled in this early German version of Romanesque Revival mingled with Renaissance Revival elements. The house is clad in a light-colored sandstone from Prairie du Chien and has bay windows and "a fancifully bracketed octagonal belvedere." Exterior and interior design elements are said to resemble those of Wisconsin's third state capitol building, which the same architects designed.

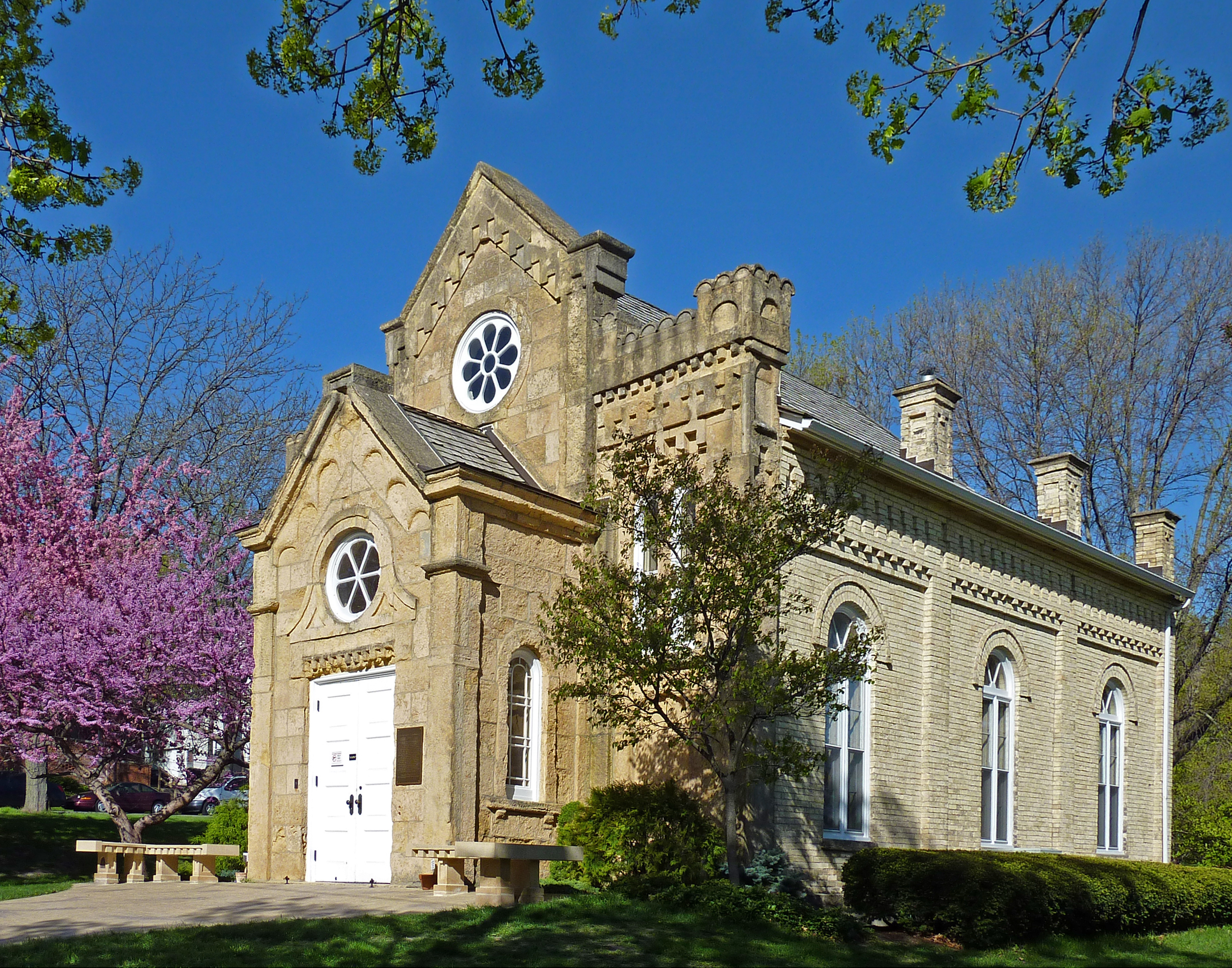
Gates of Heaven Synagogue, Rundbogenstil (early German Renaissance Revival), 1863

- Gates of Heaven Synagogue at 300 E. Gorham Street is another Rundbogenstil building designed by August Kutzbock and built in 1863.
- Holy Redeemer Catholic Church at 132 W. Johnson Street was built in 1865, designed by John Nader with round-topped arches above windows and doors. This building is clad in sandstone, with a square tower leading to an octagonal spire. This was the first German Catholic church built in the city.

=== Gothic Revival ===
- The Cory House at 107 W. Gorham Street is a 2-story house built in 1876. Hallmarks of Gothic Revival present in this house are the steeply pitched roof, tall narrow windows, and the elaborate patterned bargeboards on the gable ends.

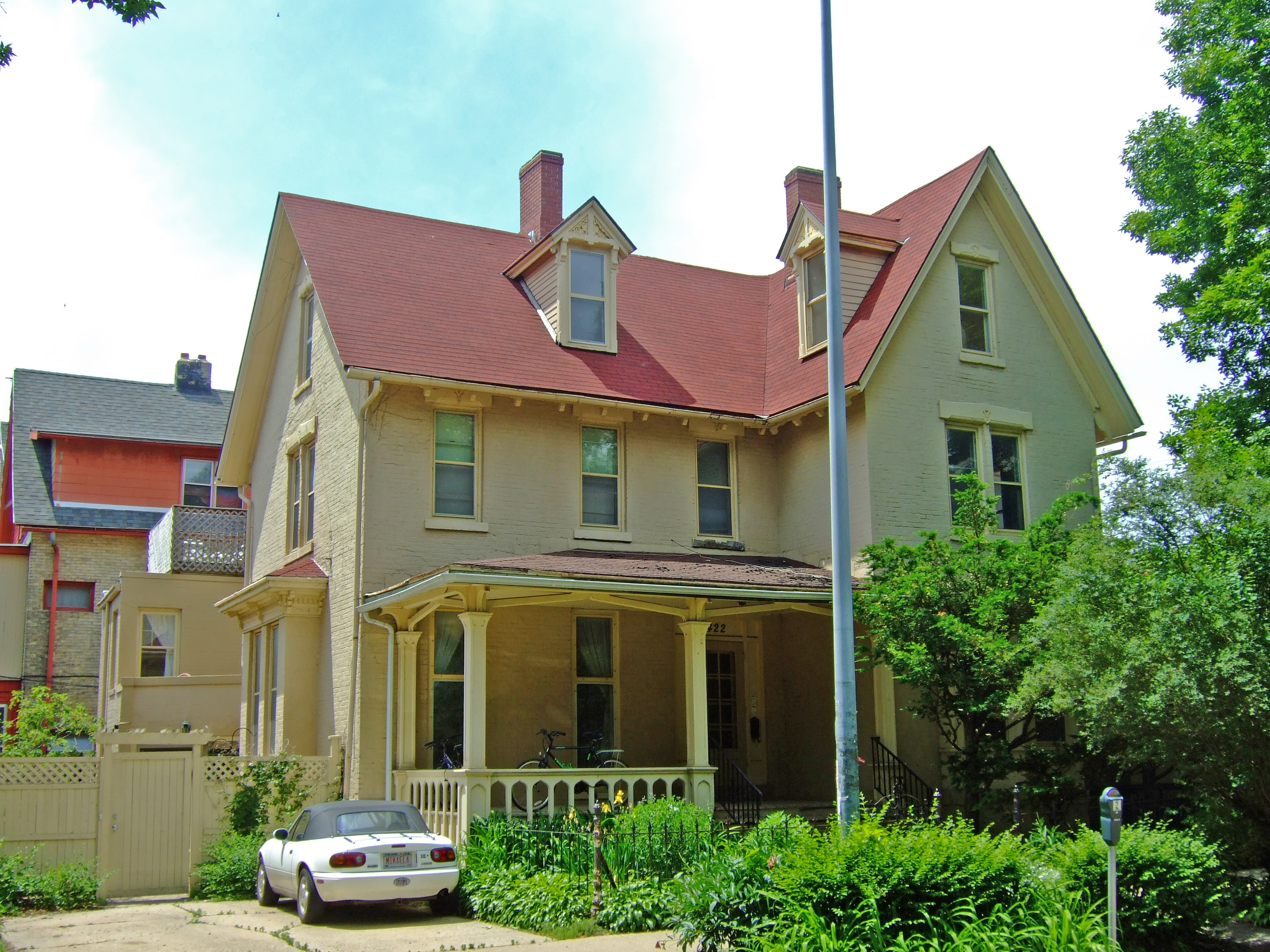
Braley House, Gothic Revival, 1875

- The Judge Arthur B. Braley House at 422 N. Henry Street is a larger, simpler example, built in 1875.
- Bethel Evangelical Lutheran Church at 312 Wisconsin Avenue is a late Gothic structure built much later, in 1940. The style was long favored for churches. The steep roofs, pointed-arch windows, and steeple all emphasize the vertical, which is sometimes interpreted as pointing to heaven.

=== Second Empire ===
The hallmark of Second Empire style in the US is the mansard roof.

- The mansion at 28 E. Gilman Street was built for the banker Napoleon Bonaparte Van Slyke in 1858 with a Rundbogenstil design by August Kutzbock. Instead of moving in, Van Slyke rented the house to fellow banker James Richardson. Romanesque round arches top all the windows and doors, but in 1870 the house was remodeled with a mansard roof to update it in Second Empire style. The physician Dr. George Keenan lived here from 1900 to 1916. The mansion is thus known variously as the Van Slyke / Richardson / Keenan House.
- The George Hickock House at 504 N. Henry Street is a smaller 2.5-story home, originally built as Second Empire from a design by David R. Jones.

=== Queen Anne ===
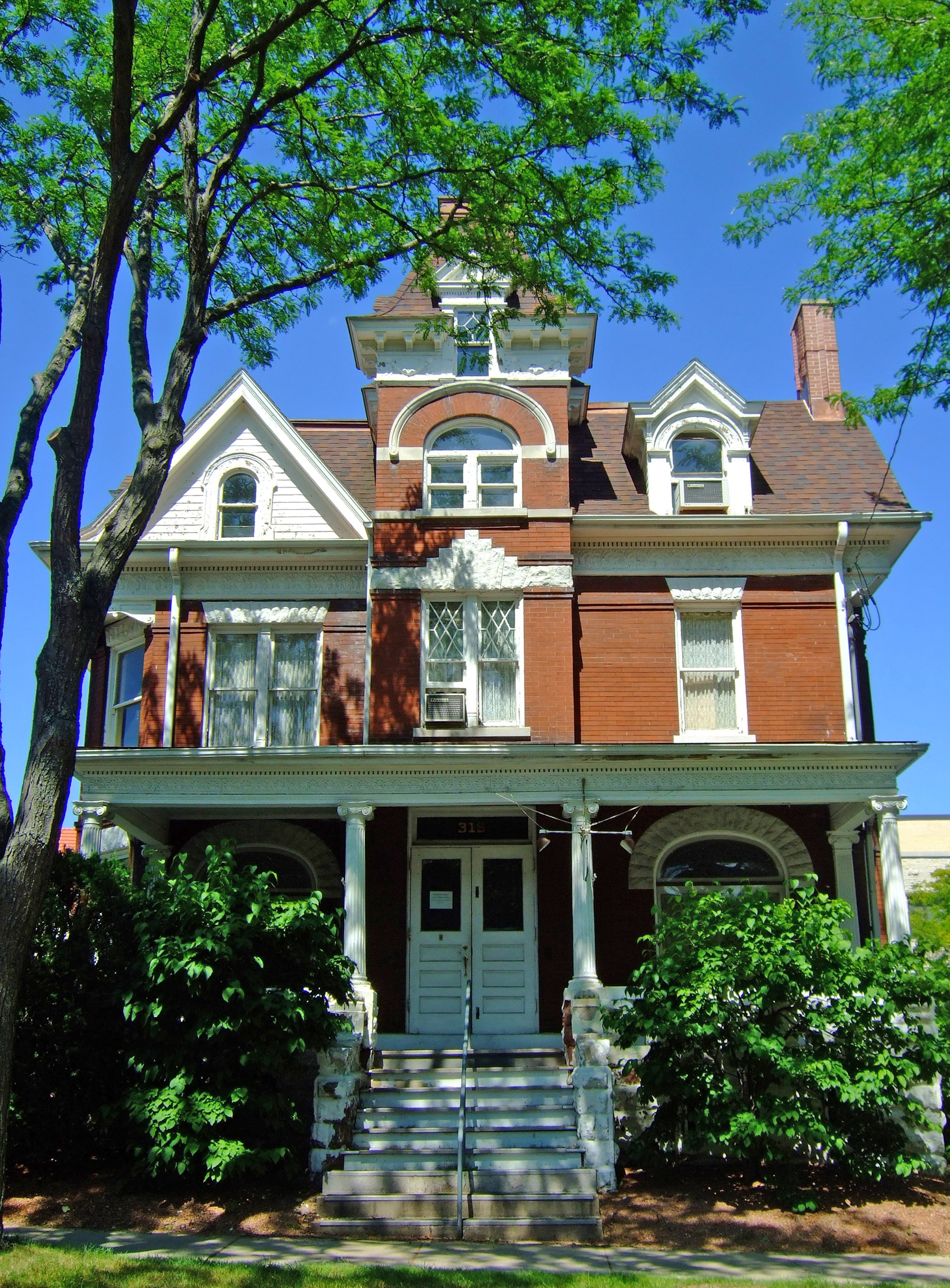
Steensland House, Queen Anne, 1896

Queen Anne is the most common style in the district. Some good examples are:

- The Campbell House at 125 E. Gilman Street is a 3-story Queen Anne house built in 1883. Hallmarks of the style present in this house are the asymmetric façade, the corner tower, the wraparound front porch, the varied surface textures, and the complex roof. The lower parts are clad in clapboard—common for this style.
- The Brown Rental House at 137 E. Gorham Street is an 1893 Queen Anne house clad in rock-faced stone with a round tower with a conical roof. The gable ends are clad in shingles, and a Palladian window sits in the front gable peak. The NRHP nomination classifies this house as Richardsonian Romanesque, but some consider that style to be a stone-clad rendition of Queen Anne.
- The Steensland House at 315 N. Carroll Street is a 3-story brick house built in 1896, designed by J. O. Gordon and F. W. Paunack to bubble with different textures and shapes. The asymmetry, the complex roof, and the full-width front porch are all characteristic of Queen Anne style, yet this house is not a typical example. The house was built for Halle Steensland, a Norwegian immigrant who worked his way up from store clerk to insurance man and banker, vice-consul to Sweden and Norway, and philanthropist.

=== Tudor Revival ===
- The Hart House at 412 Wisconsin Avenue was built in 1896, designed by Claude & Starck in Tudor Revival style. Typical of the style, it has a steeply pitched roof and stucco with half-timbering.

=== Neoclassical ===
- The Winterbotham House at 15 E. Gilman Street is a Neoclassical house designed by Jeremiah K. Cady of Chicago and built in 1910. The front door is framed by concrete pilasters supporting a broken pediment. The house is clad in red brick framed by large pilasters at the corners, which support an entablature and a parapet decorated with swags.

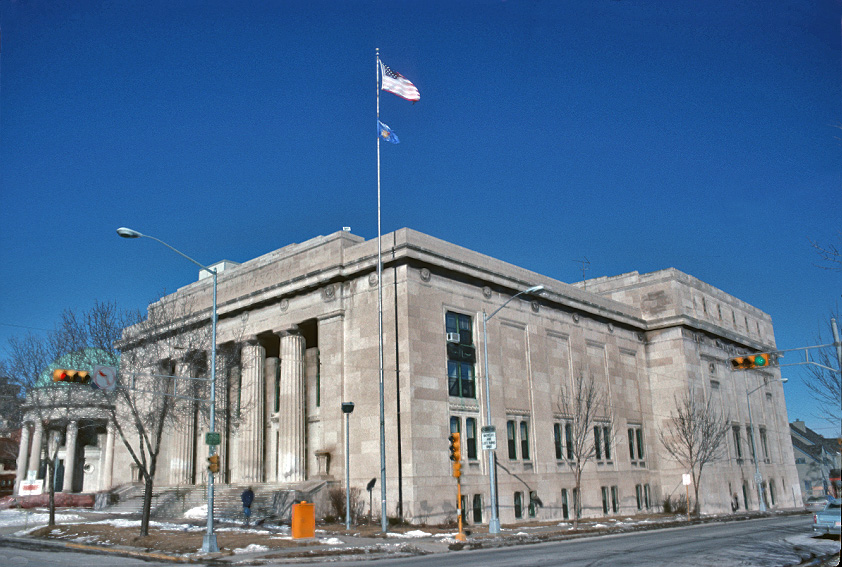
Masonic Temple, Neoclassical, 1923

- The Madison Masonic Temple at 301 Wisconsin Avenue is a Neoclassical meeting hall designed by Law and Law and built in 1923. The façade features four colossal fluted Doric columns.

=== Mediterranean Revival ===
- The Pinckney Apartments at 204 N. Pinckney Street is a 4-story apartment building built in 1911. Elements of Mediterranean Revival style present are the low-pitched tile roof and the reddish brick. The stucco and iron balconies give the building a flavor of Spanish Colonial Revival.

=== Craftsman ===
- The First Unitarian Society Parsonage at 504 N. Carroll Street was designed by Edward F. Starck and built in 1910. It combines the hallmark exposed rafter tails of Craftsman style with stucco, false half-timbering, bay windows, and a full-width front porch. It is large and elaborate compared to many Craftsman homes.

=== Prairie School ===
- The Wootton-Mead House at 120 W. Gorham Street is an American Foursquare floorplan house built in 1907 with Prairie School styling in the broad eaves, the broad front porch, and the bands of windows. All of these emphasize the horizontal in a fairly conventional-looking house.
- The Beacroft House at 514 N. Carroll Street was designed by Claude & Starck and built in 1911, again with broad eaves and bands of windows, but with bold brick pilasters at the corners and a gable end that suggests a pediment.

=== Dutch Colonial Revival ===
- The Jackson house at 415 N. Carroll Street was designed by Frost and Granger and built 1907-1909. The gambrel roof is the hallmark of Dutch Colonial Revival style. This is a large and elaborate example, with a stone-clad first story, a cantilevered second story supported by brackets, and chimney pots.

=== Colonial Revival ===
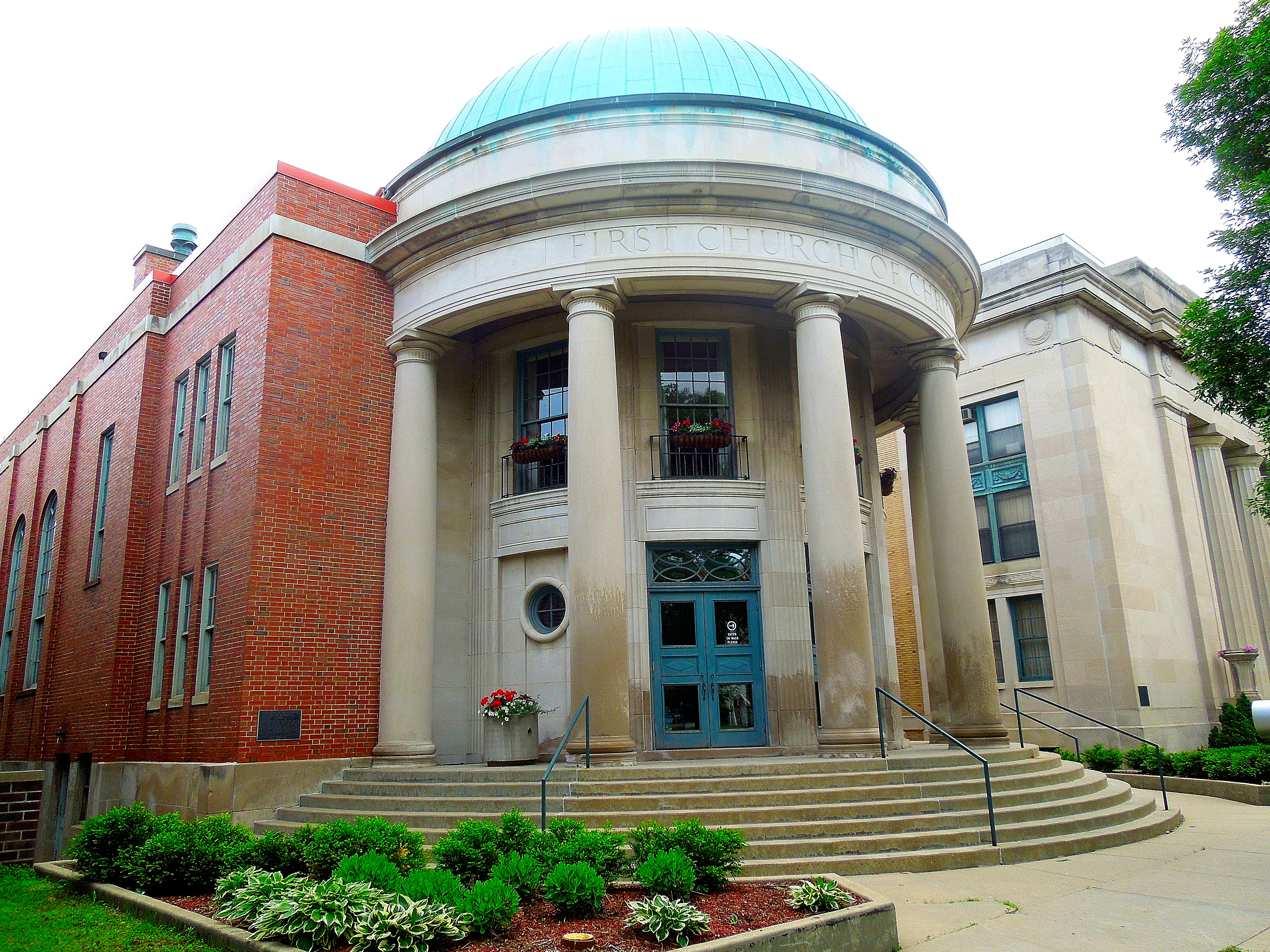
First Church of Christ Scientist, Georgian Revival, 1929

- The Schumaker / Bollenbeck House at 104 W. Gorham Street is a 2.5 side-gabled brick house designed by Ferdinand Kronenberg and built in 1922. Typical of Colonial Revival style, it is largely symmetric and formal, with the front door framed in sidelights and fanlight, with columns supporting the porch. This particular instance also has corner quoins in brick and modillions under the cornice.
- The First Church of Christ, Scientist, building at 315 Wisconsin Avenue was designed by Frank G. Riley and built in 1929. Its front is a circular portico with colossal Doric columns and a copper dome. The church is the Georgian Revival subtype of Colonial Revival.

=== Art Moderne ===
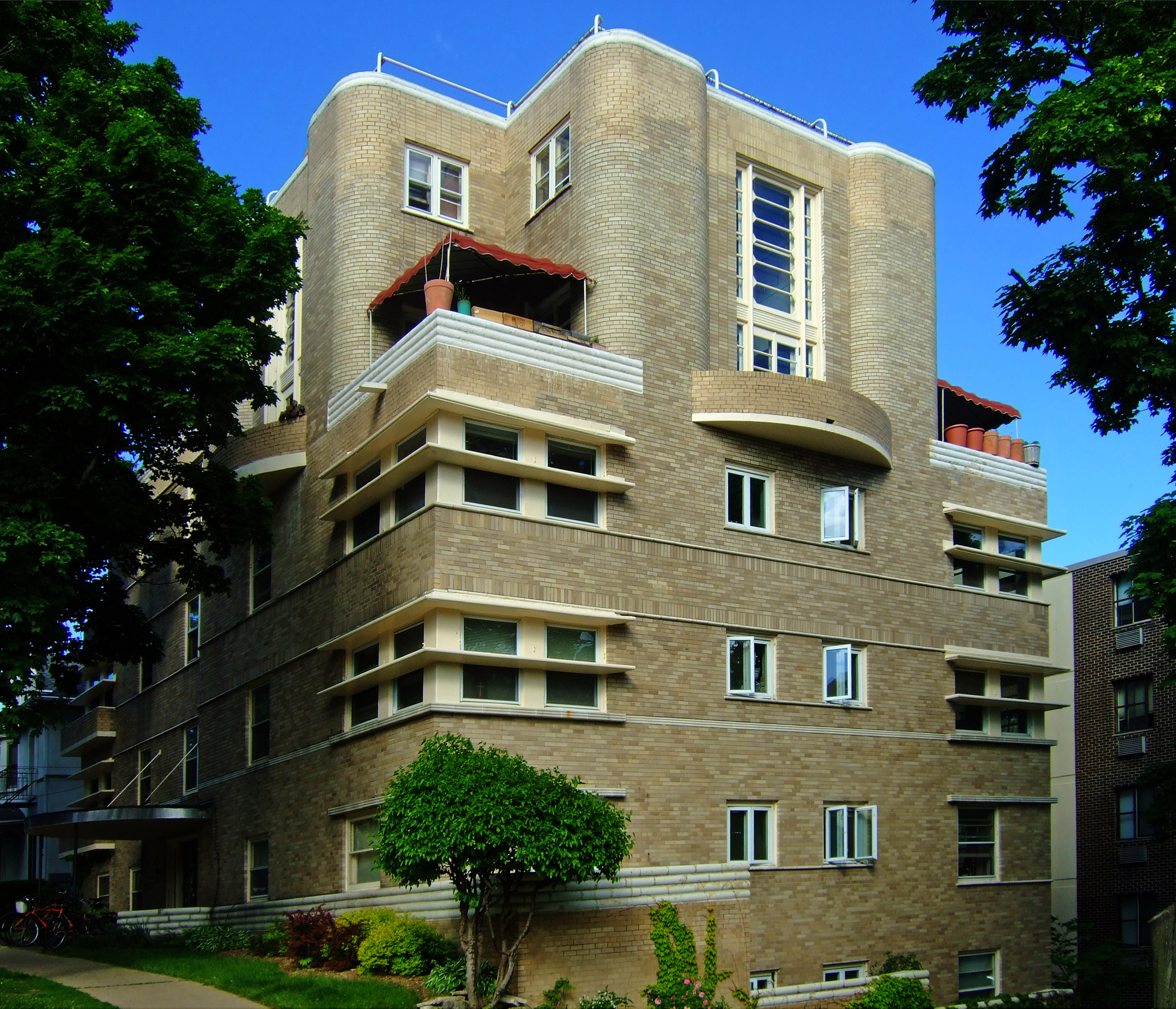
Quisling Towers, Art Moderne, 1937

- The Quisling Towers at 1 E. Gilman Street is an apartment building designed by Lawrence Monberg in Art Moderne style and built in 1937 for Dr. Abraham Quisling. Typical of the style, it has some smooth, rounded surfaces, like the streamlined shape of an airplane, along with strong horizontal lines.
- The original part of the Edgewater Hotel (1946) at 642 Wisconsin Avenue was also designed by Monberg with Art Moderne influence.
