= Judge Arthur B. Braley House =

Historic house in Wisconsin, United States

- U.S. National Register of Historic Places
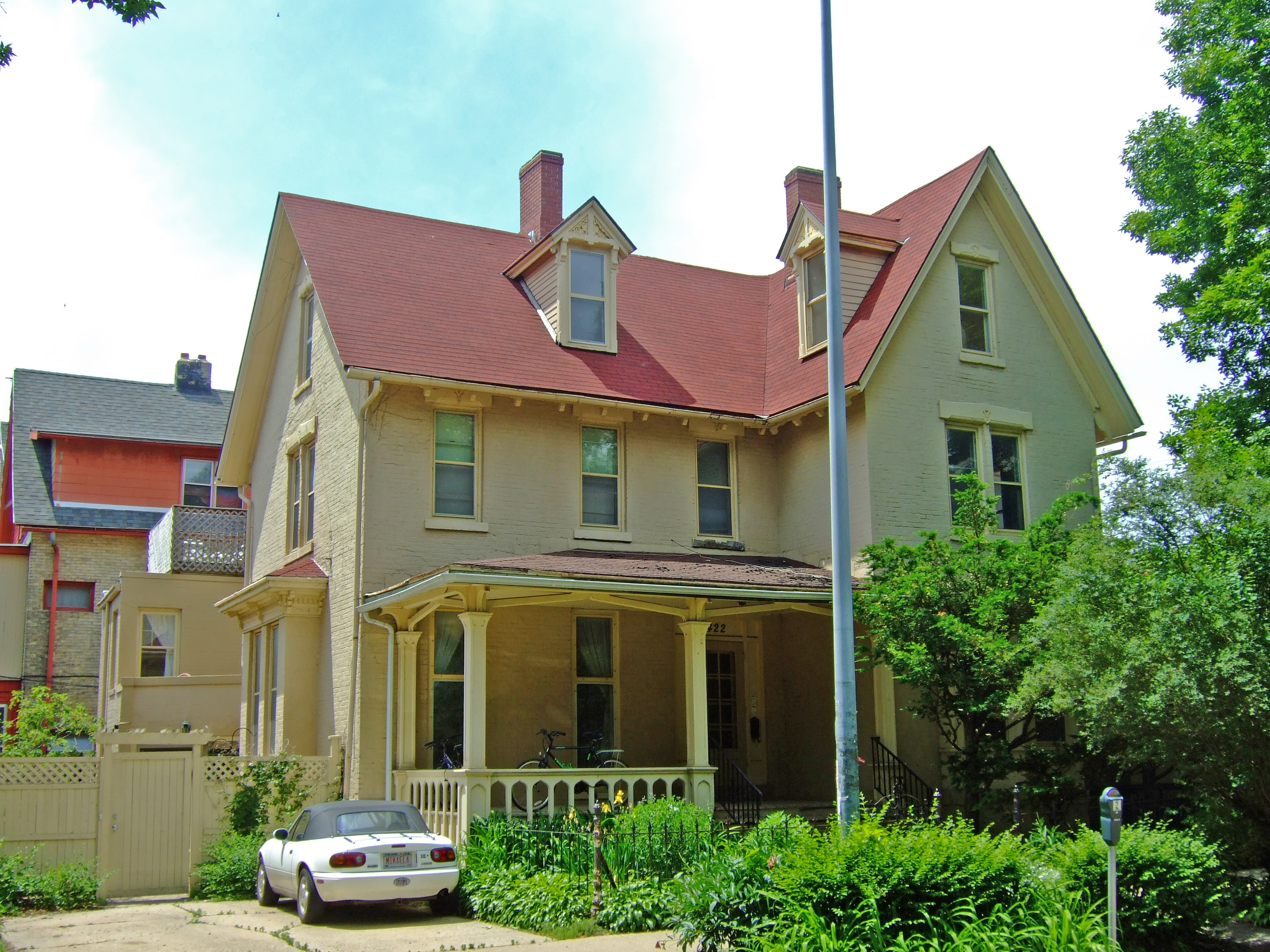
- Judge Arthur B. Braley House
- Location: 422 N. Henry St. Madison, Wisconsin
- Coordinates: 43.07579°N 89.39161°W
- Architectural style: Late Gothic Revival
- NRHP reference No.: 80000116
- Added to NRHP: November 28, 1980

The Judge Arthur B. Braley House is a Gothic Revival-style house built in 1875 in Madison, Wisconsin by a long-respected jurist, writer and a supporter of other writers, including Ella Wheeler Wilcox. In 1980 the house was added to the National Register of Historic Places.

== History ==
Arthur Braley was a New Yorker who came to Wisconsin and was admitted to the local bar in 1848, the year Wisconsin became a state. In 1856 he became the city's first Police Justice, and he held that and other civil justice positions until he was elected the first judge of Dane County's municipal court in 1874. He served in that post until he died in 1889. He was well-regarded - consistently re-elected and reappointed through his career. When he died, the Wisconsin Daily Democrat observed that "of the scores of cases sent from his court to the Supreme Court, not one has ever been reversed or remanded."

In 1875, just after being elected judge, Braley and his wife Philinda had the main section of this fine house built on Henry Street, five blocks west of the capitol. It stands 2.5 stories, with a wood frame and cream brick veneer. Its style is basically Gothic Revival, seen in the vertical massing (steep roof and tall windows), the carpenter's lace in the gable ends of the dormers, and the corbelled chimneys. The porches may have been added or redone around the turn of the century, since they are decorated with Gothic details like what Claude and Starck designed for other buildings at that time. The garage and studio wing was added in the 1940s, designed by Madison architect Frank M. Riley.

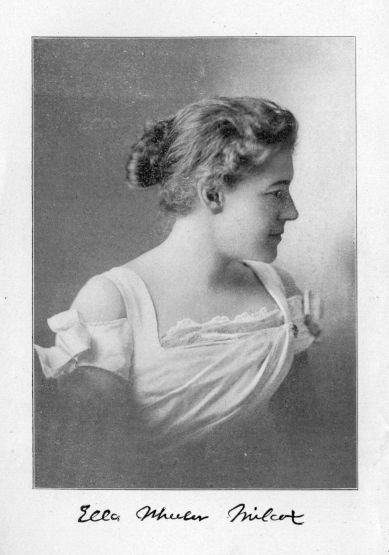
Ella Wheeler Wilcox

Judge Braley was also a writer and supporter of other writers. He served as editor of the Wisconsin Daily Patriot during the Presidential campaign of 1864 and as political editor of the Madison Daily Democrat during the 1868 Presidential election. Over the years he wrote essays, stories, political analyses, and reviews of Shakespeare "for various newspapers through the West." The Braleys' close friend Ella Wheeler Wilcox was a frequent visitor. During one of those visits, Wilcox wrote the opening line of her most enduring poem "Solitude":

Laugh, and the world laughs with you;
Weep, and you weep alone.

Judge Braley reportedly told her that if she finished the poem at the same high standard, it would be a 'literary gem.' Wilcox had been a friend of Braley from childhood and at his death she stated, "it was from his well-filled library that I gained my first knowledge of books. His editorial pen gave some of my earliest local literary efforts encouragement." After Judge Braley's death, Philinda introduced Zona Gale to Wilcox at this house. The Braleys' own son, Berton Braley became a poet and editor.

The house was designated a landmark by the Madison Landmarks Commission in 1976 and added to the NRHP in 1980 "as a tangible reminder of the Honorable Judge Arthur B. Braley, whose role in the political scene in Madison was one of influence in both local and state political thought, and in the literary arts, was one of encouragement of artful expression and its appreciation."
