= University Heights Historic District =

University Heights Historic District may refer to:

- University Heights Historic District (Darby, Montana), a National Register of Historic Places listing in Ravalli County, Montana
- University Heights Historic District (Madison, Wisconsin)
