= Langdon Street Historic District =

Historic district in Wisconsin, United States

- U.S. National Register of Historic Places
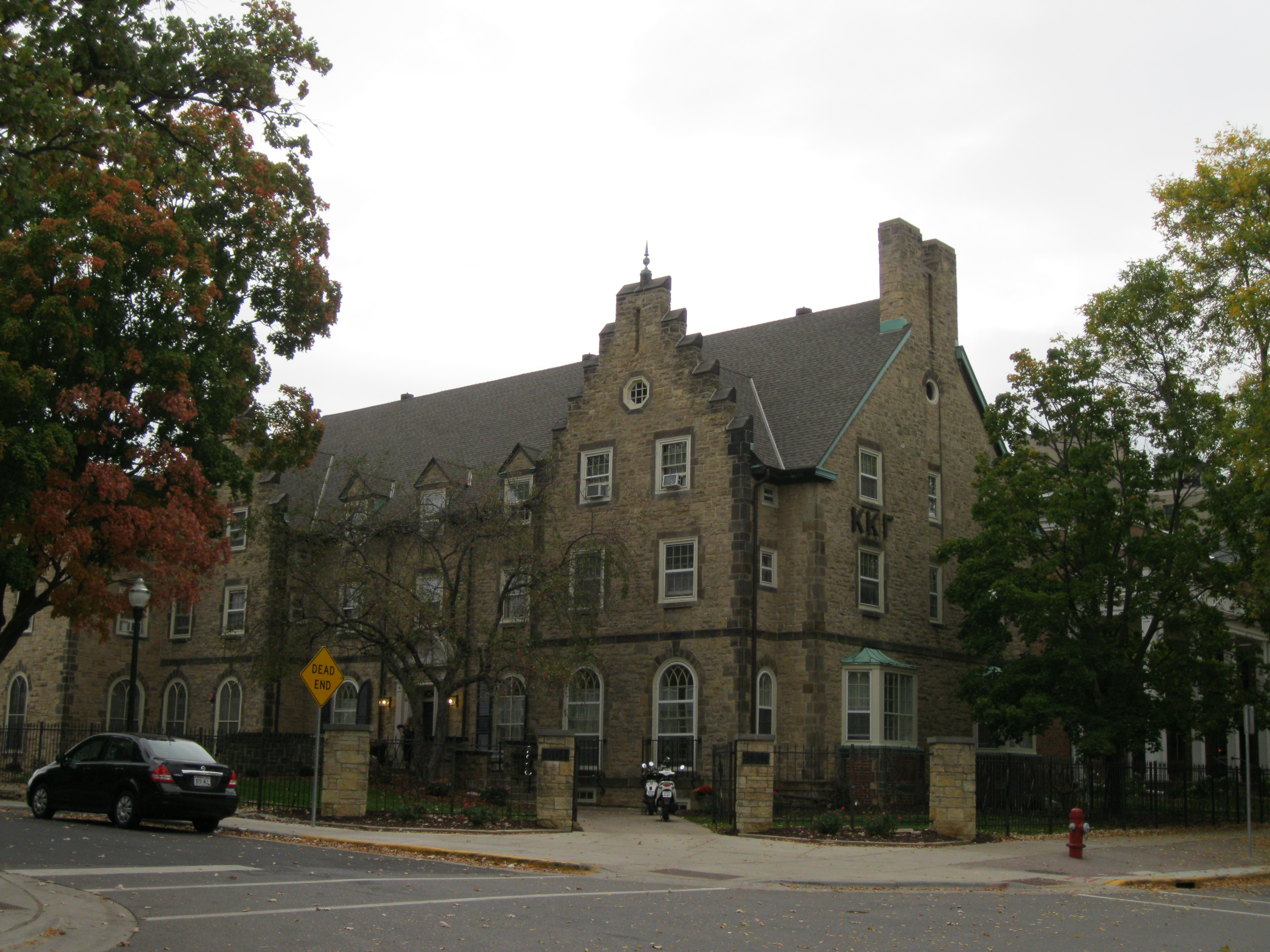
- Kappa Kappa Gamma sorority at 601 N. Henry
- Location: Roughly bounded by Lake Mendota, Wisconsin Ave., Langdon, and N. Lake Sts., Madison, Wisconsin
- Area: 19 acres (7.7 ha)
- NRHP reference No.: 86001394
- Added to NRHP: June 26, 1986

The Langdon Street Historic District is a historic neighborhood east of the UW campus in Madison, Wisconsin - home to some of Madison's most prominent residents like John B. Winslow, Chief Justice of the state Supreme Court, and nationally recognized historian Frederick Jackson Turner. The district has a high concentration of period revival style buildings - many built from 1900 to 1930 to house Greek letter societies, and many designed by Madison's prominent architects. In 1986 the district was added to the National Register of Historic Places.

== History ==
From Madison's founding in 1836 to the 1850s, what is now the Langdon Street district was a forested ridge west of the bustling little town around the capitol square. But in 1846 Julius T. Clark bought a block of that ridge and built the first house there. "At the time, other Madisonians felt he was foolish for living so far away from the center of the city. But Clark foresaw that this picturesque ridge of good, well-drained land would one day be in demand for house lots in a city beset by swamps and marshes on an already small isthmus between two large lakes."

Proving Clark right, two of the wealthiest men in Madison built homes in what would become the district in 1851: banker, future mayor and legislator Levi Baker Vilas built an Italianate mansion at the southeast corner of Langdon and Henry Streets, and merchant J.T. Marston built a classical mansion on the southwest corner. In 1853 Daniel Gorham started a steam sawmill at the end of Lake Street. By 1855 thirteen other lesser houses were added. UW faculty and their wives began to join the businessmen in the district. The neighborhood was then called "Big Bug Hill." The upper-class neighborhood continued to fill in with single-family homes until about 1890.

1890 is when fraternities began to move in. Gorham's sawmill at the end of Lake Street had been replaced around 1860 by Mendota Agricultural Works, which became Madison Manufacturing Company, and did well until the Panic of 1873. Madison Manufacturing finally folded in 1890. With that, the land was subdivided into residential lots. Around the same time, the UW was growing, from 539 students in 1886 to 2,422 in 1899. Meanwhile, the UW had closed North Hall in 1885, forcing all male students to find lodging off campus. Homes near campus were converted into student housing, which made the area less appealing to the businessmen and professionals who had lived there earlier.

== Select buildings ==
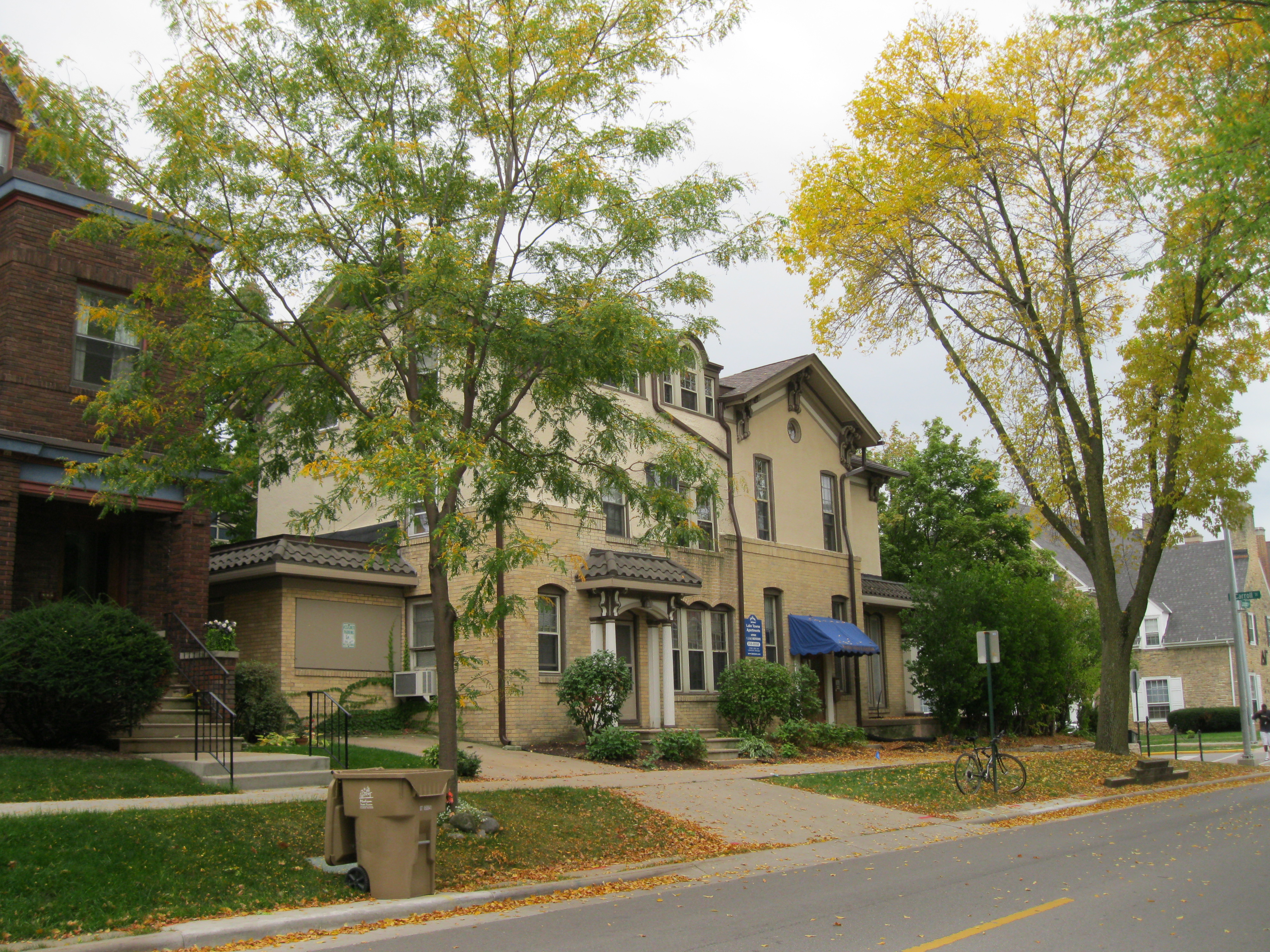
Davies house, 1874, Italianate style

Here are some important buildings in the district, and good examples of architectural styles, in roughly the order built:

The Davies house at 29 Langdon St is the best example of Italianate style in the district. Built in 1874, it stands 2.5 stories with low-pitched roofs with wide eaves supported by paired brackets, with tall windows and brick and stucco walls. John Davies was a UW professor of physics, and one of the first to conduct high-level research at the UW.

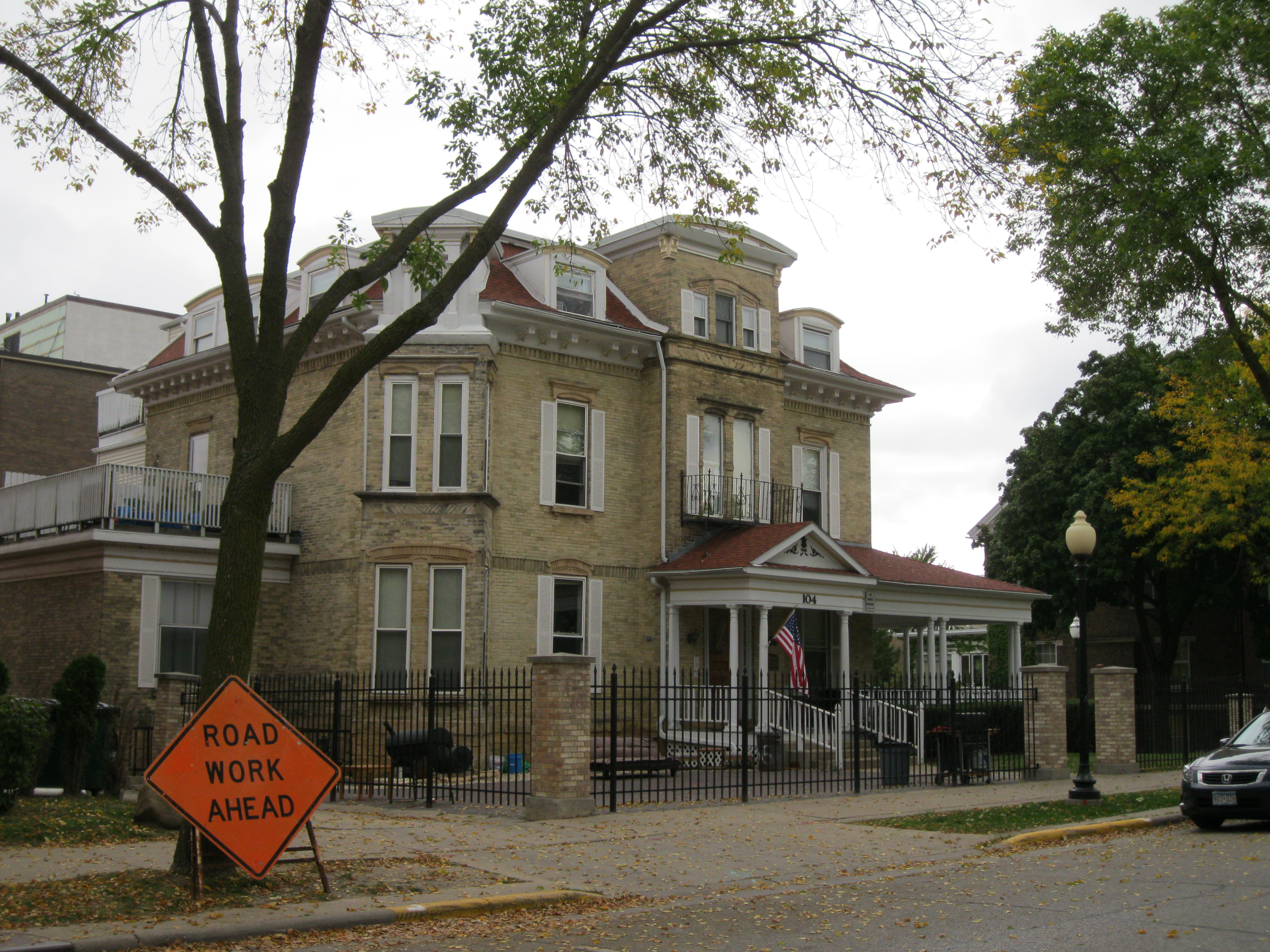
Bunn house, 1878, Second Empire style, less towers

The Romanzo and Sarah Bunn house at 104 Langdon St was built around 1878, designed by David R. Jones in Second Empire style. Two original mansard-roofed towers have been removed, but can be seen in a photo in the walking tour guide. Romanzo was an attorney, D.A., and assemblyman. When this house was built he was U.S. district judge in western Wisconsin. A year after he also became a professor of law at the UW.

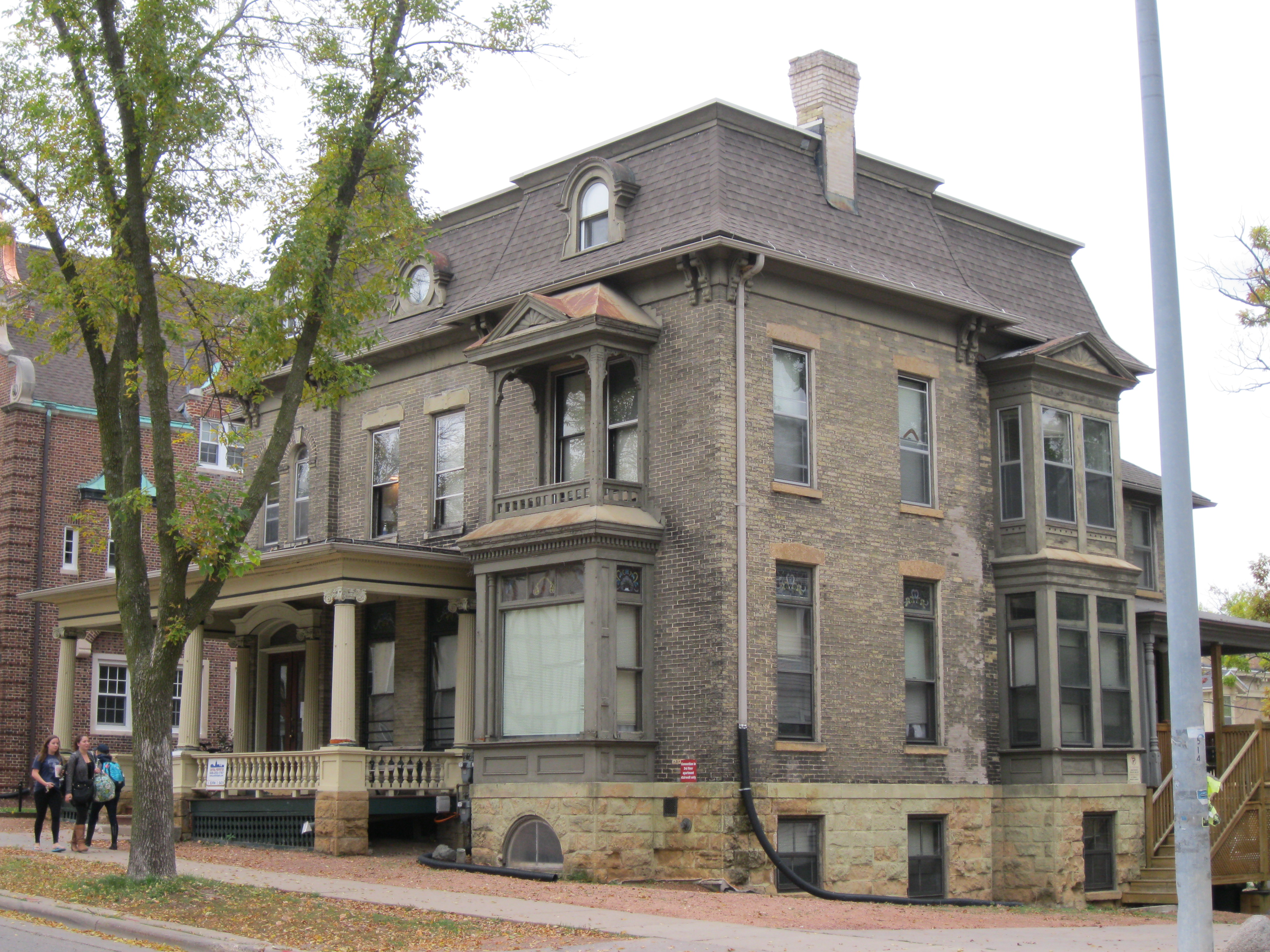
Suhr house, 1886, Second Empire style

The John J. Suhr House at 121 Langdon St is a 2.5 story brick house built in 1886, designed by John Nader in Second Empire style. The hallmark of the style is the mansard roof. This house is clad in cream brick, with tall windows and a mansard-roofed tower above the front entrance, topped with metal cresting. The classical-style porch is a later addition. John J. Suhr Sr was a German immigrant who founded Madison's German-American Bank in 1885. His son John Jr. directed the bank and lived in this house until 1957 - one of the few old families to persist in the neighborhood through the fraternity years.

The Frederick Jackson Turner house at 629 N Frances St was built in 1893, in generally Queen Anne style, with a complex roof, a tower, and a porch facing the lake. Turner was a history professor whose "Frontier thesis" proposed the idea that America's steady advance into its western frontier influenced its character and democracy different from European nations.

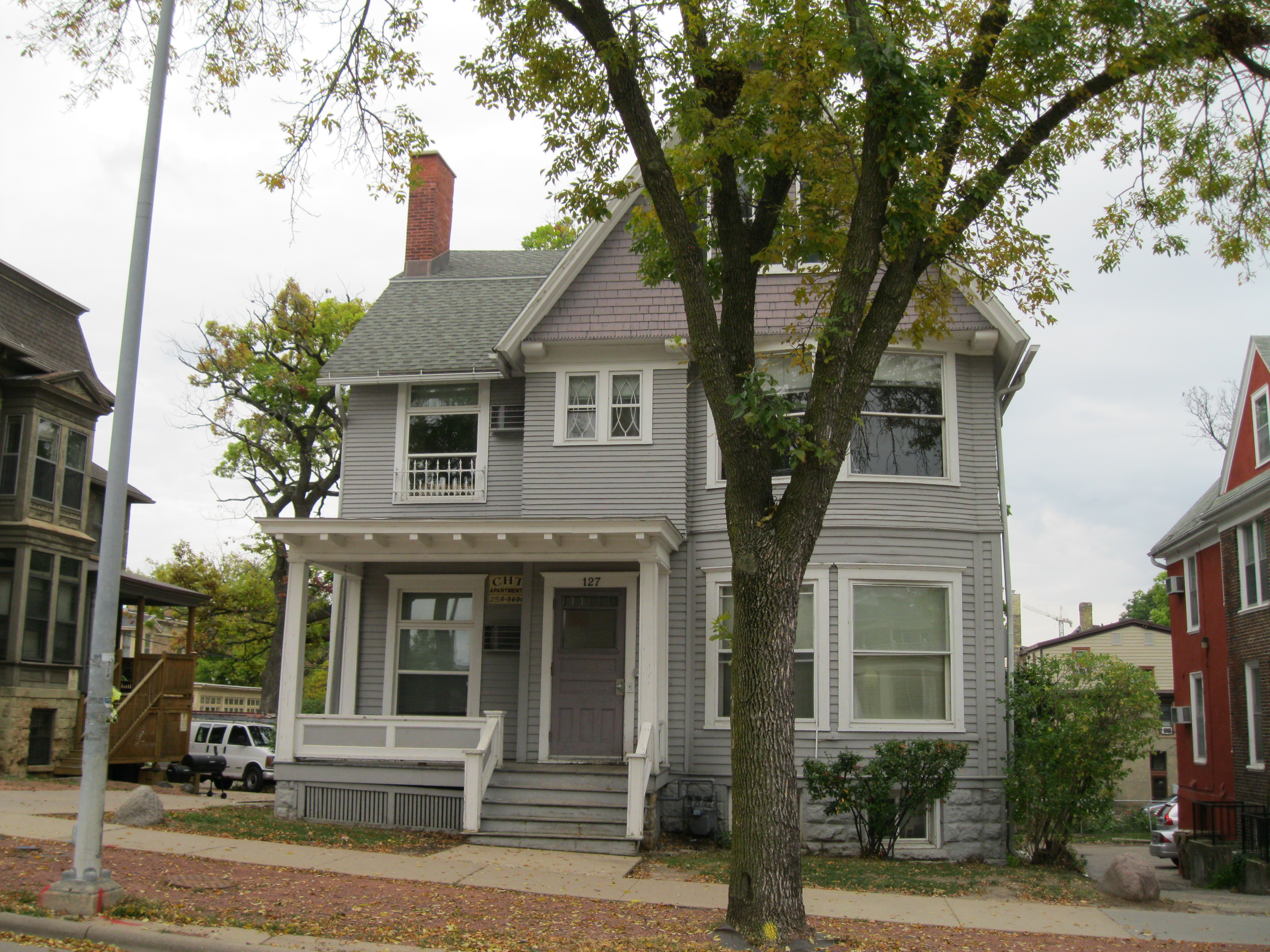
Main house, 1892, Queen Anne style

The Alexander and Emma Main house at 127 Langdon St is a well-preserved Queen Anne house built in 1892, with a cross-gable roof, a gambrel-roofed wing, shingles in the gable ends, and a two bay windows. Alexander was an insurance businessman.

The Jastrow house at 237 Langdon was built in 1891, two stories in Queen Anne style. But then around 1908 the Jastrows remodeled the house, remaking the first two stories into apartments and adding a third story and a attic for themselves to live in. The third story is Prairie Style on the exterior and Craftsman on the inside. Joseph Jastrow was a Polish-born psychology professor. He was interested in North African culture and built a Moorish-styled study in the attic, with a stained glass skylight and dark, carved wall panels. His wife Rachel Jastrow led women's causes in town.

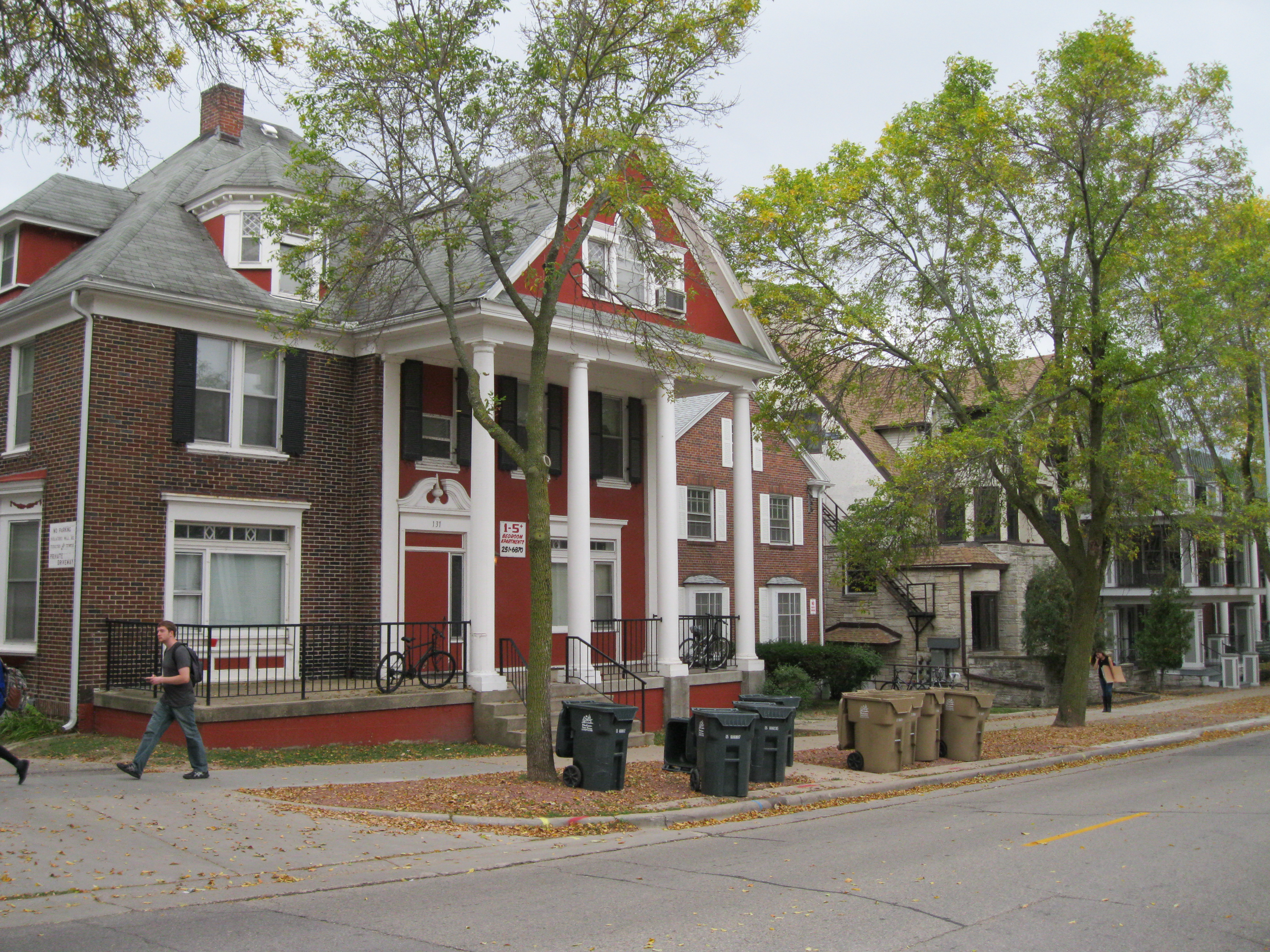
Winslow house, 1893 Queen Anne, redone as Colonial Revival

The John Bradley Winslow house at 131 Langdon St was built in 1893 as a 2.5-story generally cube-shaped Queen Anne-style house, with brick walls and hip roof. John B. Winslow was an attorney and judge who was appointed to the state Supreme Court in 1891, shortly before he built this house, and became Chief Justice in 1907. The house is a good example of how buildings are sometimes updated to fit current styles. Its original Queen Anne look can be seen in a photo from 1896-1900 in the walking tour guide. Some time after, the 2-story portico with the columns and the door frame with the broken pediment were added to remake it as a more stylish Colonial Revival.

The Dean John and Phoebe Johnson house at 626 N Henry St was built in 1902, designed by Claude & Starck as a modest Queen Anne-styled building but with some influence of Prairie Style showing in the broad eaves, the Sullivanesque terra cotta panels on the porch columns, and the George Maher-esque arch-topped dormer. John B. Johnson was a Dean of the School of Engineering. After the Johnsons, the house was occupied by the Delta Tau Delta fraternity.

The Frank and Mary Brown house at 28 Langdon St is a Colonial Revival structure built in 1905, 2.5 stories, clad in brick with corner quoins, with dentils under the eaves and cornice returns. The entry porch is supported by Ionic columns, with a balustrade above. Frank was involved in real estate and helped found the forerunner of Ray-O-Vac batteries, a big industry in Madison. After Frank died, Mary lived in the house until 1927, when the Alpha Phi sorority moved in.

The Norseman house at 613 Howard Place is a 2-story hip-roofed house built in 1910. It is Prairie Style, with an emphasis on the horizontal and unadorned geometric shapes, with stucco exterior and a flared hip roof. It was built by Ole Norseman, Madison's city clerk at the time. Norseman built an identical house next door in 1914, lived there, and rented this house out.

The Hanks Bungalow #1 at 211 Lakelawn Place is one of four adjacent bungalows built in 1914 by attorney and realtor Stanley Hanks. The four are similar 1.5 story side-gabled structures with full-width porches across the front - but they aren't identical. This one has a shed-roofed dormer, shingles in the gable ends and round columns supporting the front porch.

The Kappa Sigma fraternity house at 124 Langdon St was designed by Frank Riley in classic Georgian Revival style and built in 1923. Typical of the style, this structure is symmetric, clad in red brick with white trim. It stands 3.5 stories, with prominent chimneys on each end.

The Beta Theta Pi fraternity house at 622 Mendota Ct is a 3-story structure built in 1925, designed by Law & Law in Mediterranean Revival style. Typical of that style, it has a brown brick exterior and a low-pitched hip roof covered with red tile. Beta Theta Pi was one of the first fraternities at Madison, with its chapter established in 1873.

The Villa Maria at 615 Howard Place is an apartment building designed by Frank Riley in Spanish Colonial Revival style and built 1925-26. Hallmarks of the style are the plain light-colored stucco walls, the groups of arch-topped windows, and the iron grillwork.

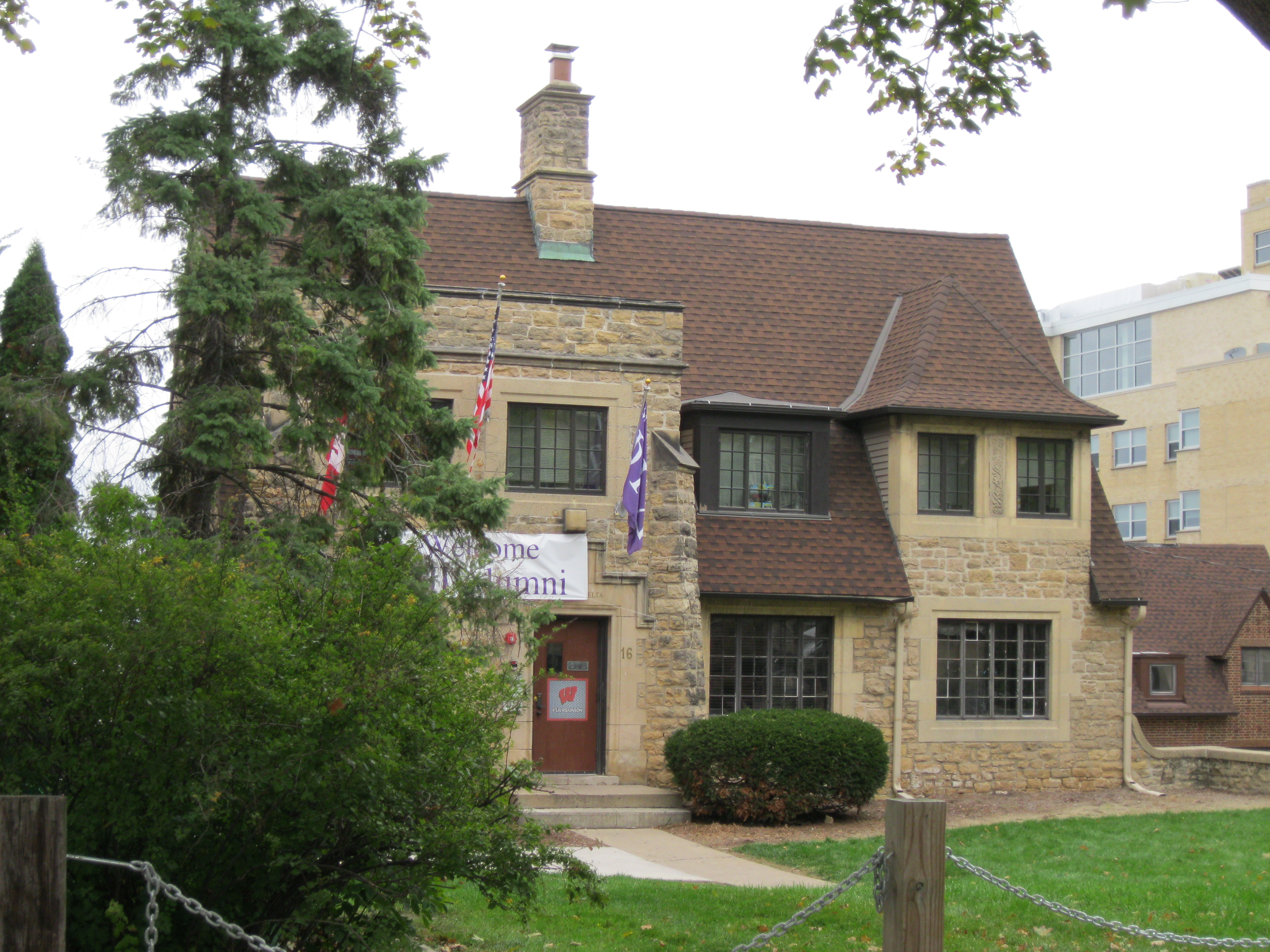
Phi Gamma Delta house, 1926, Tudor Revival

The Phi Gamma Delta fraternity house at 16 Langdon St was built in 1926, designed by Law, Law & Potter to look like an English cottage from Langdon Street. The style is Tudor Revival, with the outside clad in rough limestone blocks, stone tabs around casement windows, and a steeply pitched roof. Despite the façade of a cottage, the back of the building extends three stories down the slope toward Lake Mendota.

The Chi Omega sorority house at 115 Langdon St was designed by Frank Riley and built in 1926. Quite distinctive, the style is Dutch Colonial Revival, with shaped parapets on the end gables and dormers, corner quoins, and a classical entrance with pilasters, frieze, and pediment.

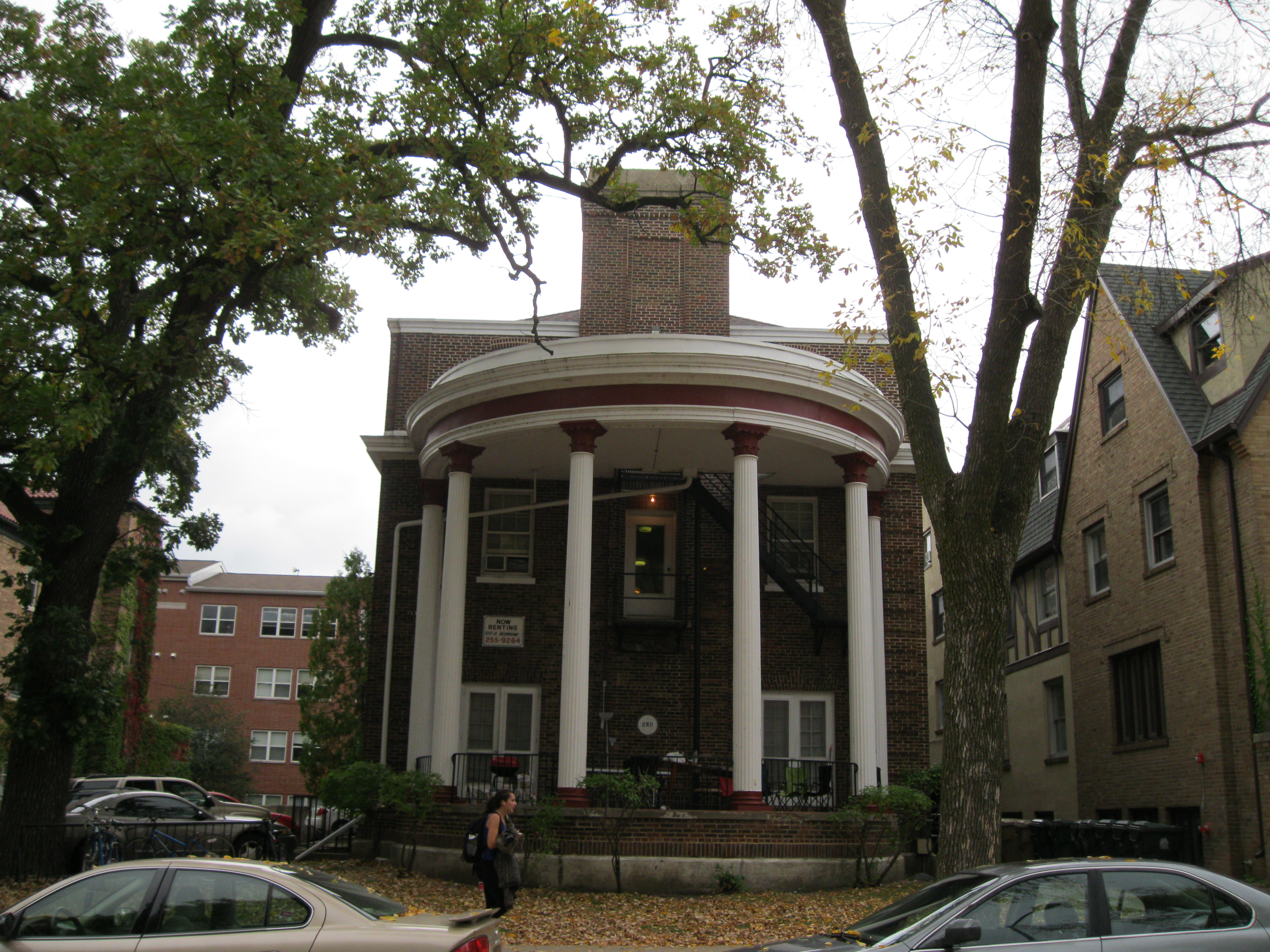
Phi Sigma Kappa, 1926, Georgian Revival

The Phi Sigma Kappa fraternity house at 260 Langdon St was designed by Frank Riley in Georgian Revival style and built in 1926. The red brick and symmetry are typical of the style. A colossal round portico shelters the front entrance.

The Alpha Omicron Pi sorority building at 636 Langdon St was built in 1928, designed by Law, Law & Potter in French Provincial style, with the corner tower and half-timbering giving it the look of a chateau.

== Today ==
Langdon Street is now home to "Greek Row" at the University of Wisconsin-Madison. It is well known for its Fraternity and Sorority houses.
