= Main Street Historic District (Darlington, Wisconsin) =

Historic district in Wisconsin, United States

- U.S. National Register of Historic Places
- U.S. Historic district
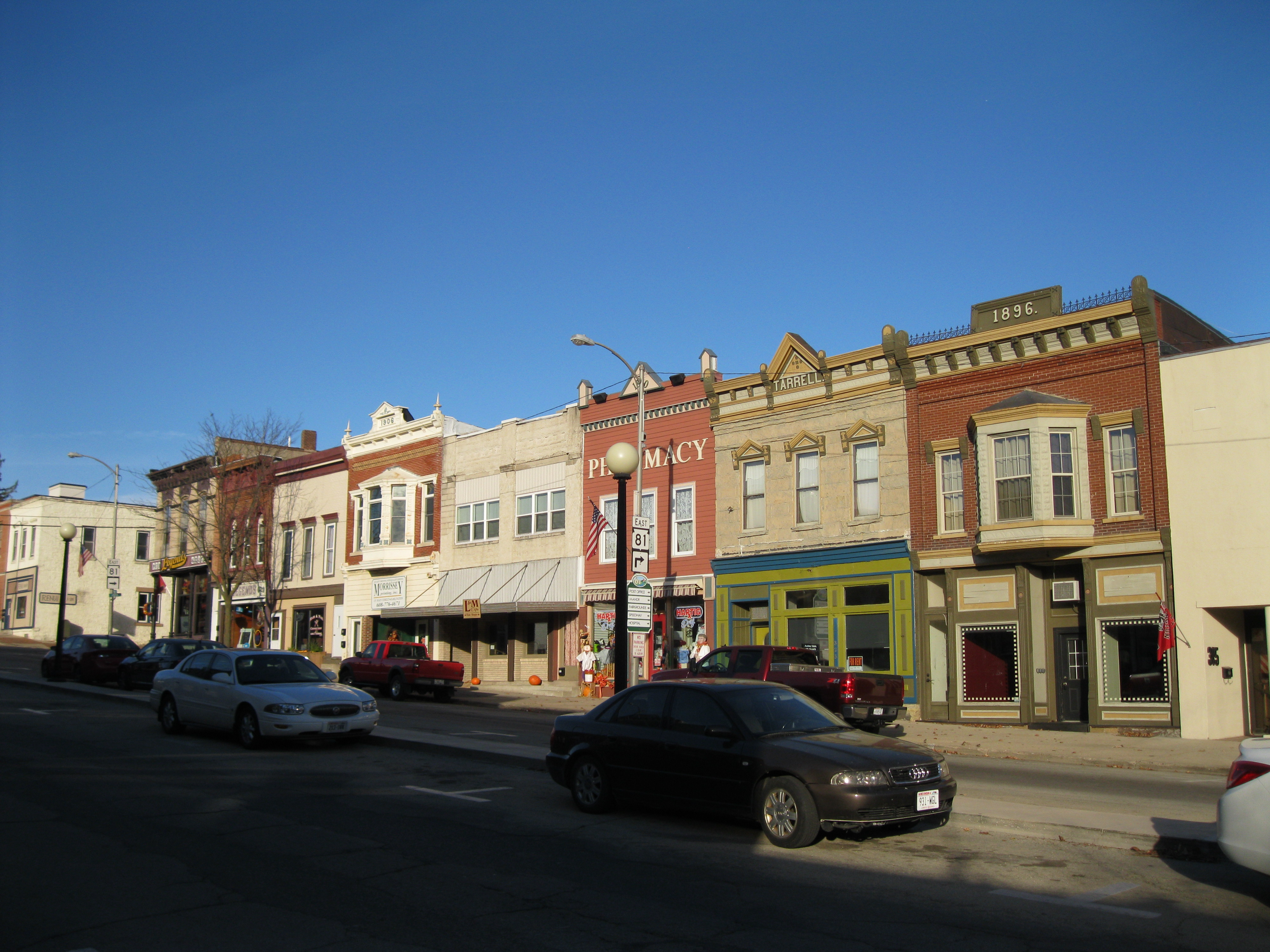

- Location within Wisconsin Location within the United States
- Location: Roughly bounded by Main, Ann, Louisa and Wells Sts., Darlington, Wisconsin
- Coordinates: 42.679444°N 90.117778°W
- Area: 8 hectares (20 acres)
- Architect: Frank Riley, Lewis Siberz
- Architectural style: Italianate
- NRHP reference No.: 94001210
- Added to NRHP: October 7, 1994

The Main Street Historic District is located in Darlington, Wisconsin. It was listed as a historic district on the National Register of Historic Places in 1994. It included 40 contributing buildings on 8 hectares (20 acres).

It includes Darlington's old downtown, including the 1860 J.B. Cutting Livery Stable, the 1879 Italianate-styled Schreiter Building, the 1883 Romanesque Revival Driver's Store and Opera House, the 1896 Queen Anne Miller and Fardy Dry Goods Store, the 1911 Neoclassical Odd Fellows Hall, the 1919 Commercial Vernacular Hotel Olson, and the 1930 Moderne-style Iowa Oil Co. & Filling Station.

The First National Bank building was probably designed by an architect. But the Citizens National Bank (1885), at 330 Main Street, is the only building known specifically to have been architect-designed: its new facade in 1928 was designed by Madison, Wisconsin architects Frank Riley and Lewis Siberz. According to the NRHP nomination, the building's facade has monumental fluted Doric pilasters, an entablature, and a pediment "enriched with a large medallion", and overall "recalls a Greek temple front."
