= Frank M. Riley =

American architect

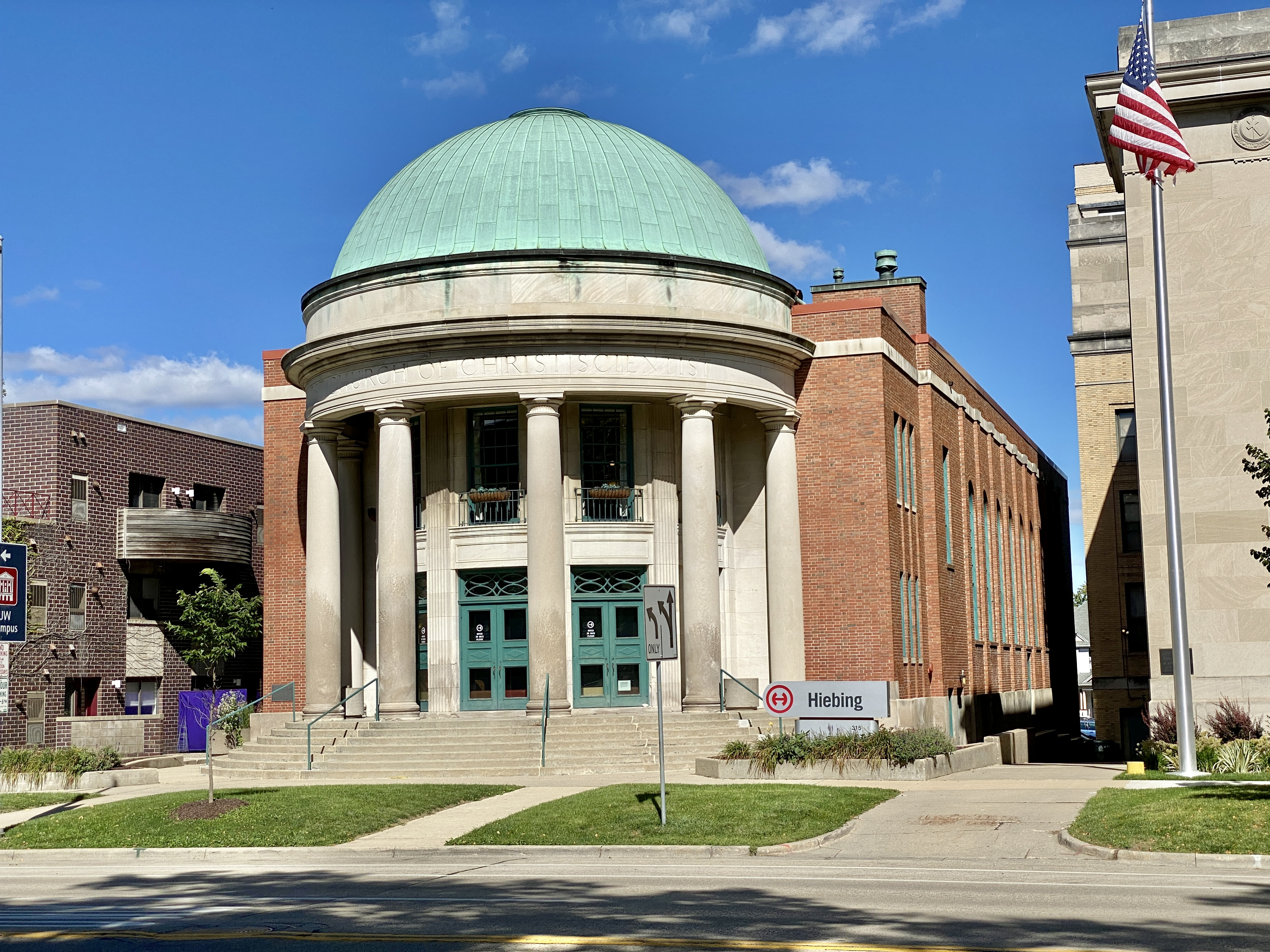
First Church of Christ, Scientist, 1929

Frank M. Riley (September 10, 1875 – May 22, 1949) was an architect of Madison, Wisconsin. A number of his works are listed on the National Register of Historic Places for their architecture.

== Early life ==
He was born Frank Morris Riley in Madison, Wisconsin, on September 10, 1875. His father, Edward F. Riley (1847–1927) was secretary of the University of Wisconsin Board of Regents from 1888 to 1906 and was a prominent member of business and real estate circles in Madison.

== Career ==
Riley started studying civil engineering at the University of Wisconsin in 1894. In 1897 he relocated to Boston to study architecture at the Massachusetts Institute of Technology, where he remained until 1900. From 1900 to 1908, Riley worked for architectural firms in Boston, and then in his own practice until 1911. He lived in London from 1911 until 1913, and in Italy and Germany from 1913 to 1914. In Germany, he worked for an architect in Munich for a year. In 1914, he returned to Madison, where he remained for the rest of his life.

Riley is best known for his residential designs, mostly executed in the Colonial Revival or Georgian Revival styles. He also created prominent houses in Madison in the Tudor Revival, Mediterranean Revival, French Provincial, and Norman Revival styles.

Riley's return to Madison coincided with a time when the city's economic and social elite were moving from the congested downtown to new suburbs on the outskirts of the city. From 1914 to 1941, Riley designed houses in Madison suburbs such as Nakoma, University Heights, and the Highlands, and in neighboring Shorewood Hills and Maple Bluff. He also designed a number of fraternity and sorority houses on Langdon Street and some important nonresidential and institutional buildings in Madison. Toward the end of his career, he was also associated with Lewis A. Siberz, a former draftsman in his office, in the firm of Riley & Siberz.

He died in Madison on May 22, 1949.

== Selected works ==
Riley's designs include:

- James Marsh Estate (1910), 70 Salem Road, Topsfield, Massachusetts, Arts & Crafts summer retreat.
- Harry & Jessie Butler house (1916), 1040 Sherman Avenue, Georgian Revival, contributes to the Sherman Avenue Historic District.
- Dr. Sheldon house (1921), 1154 Sherman Avenue, Georgian Revival, contributes to the Sherman Avenue Historic District.

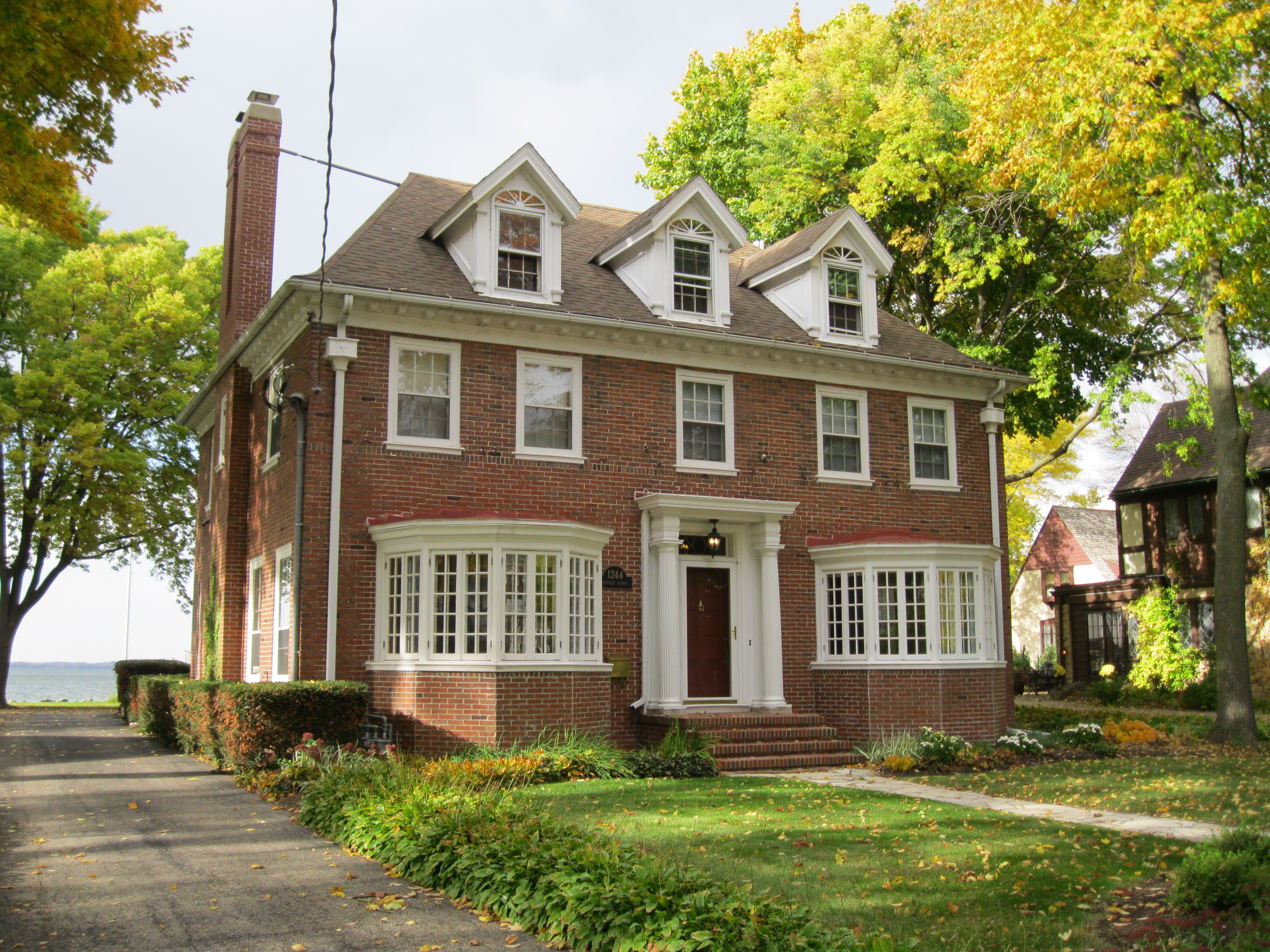
Warner house, 1922, Georgian Revival

- Harry M. Warner house (1922), 1244 Sherman Avenue, Georgian Revival, contributes to the Sherman Avenue Historic District.
- Ross W. Harris house (1923), 8 N Prospect Ave, Madison, Tudor Revival, contributes to the University Heights Historic District, and is considered the most authentic house of this style in Madison.
- Maud and Howard O. Moores house (1923), 220 N Prospect Ave, Madison, Georgian Revival, contributes to the University Heights Historic District.
- Kappa Sigma fraternity house (1923), 124 Langdon St, Madison, Georgian Revival, contributes to Langdon Street Historic District.
- Villa Maria apartments (1925-26), 615 Howard Place, Madison, Spanish Colonial Revival, contributes to Langdon Street Historic District.

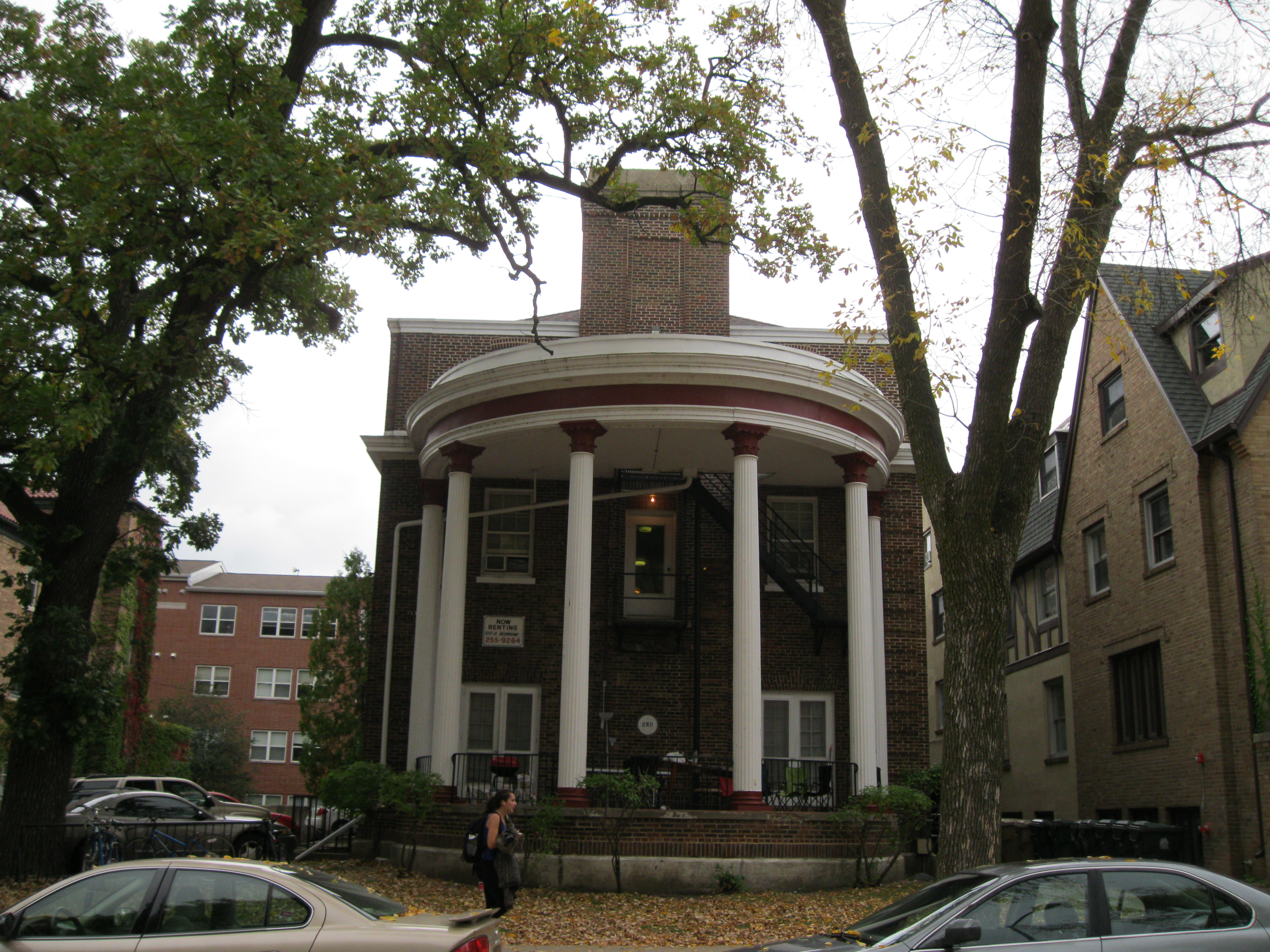
Phi Sigma Kappa, 1926, Georgian Revival

- Phi Sigma Kappa fraternity house (1926), 260 Langdon St, Madison, Georgian Revival, contributes to Langdon Street Historic District.
- Phi Kappa Sigma fraternity house (1926), 233 Lakelawn Place, Madison, Georgian Revival, contributes to Langdon Street Historic District.
- Chi Omega sorority house (1926), 115 Langdon St, Madison, Dutch Colonial Revival.

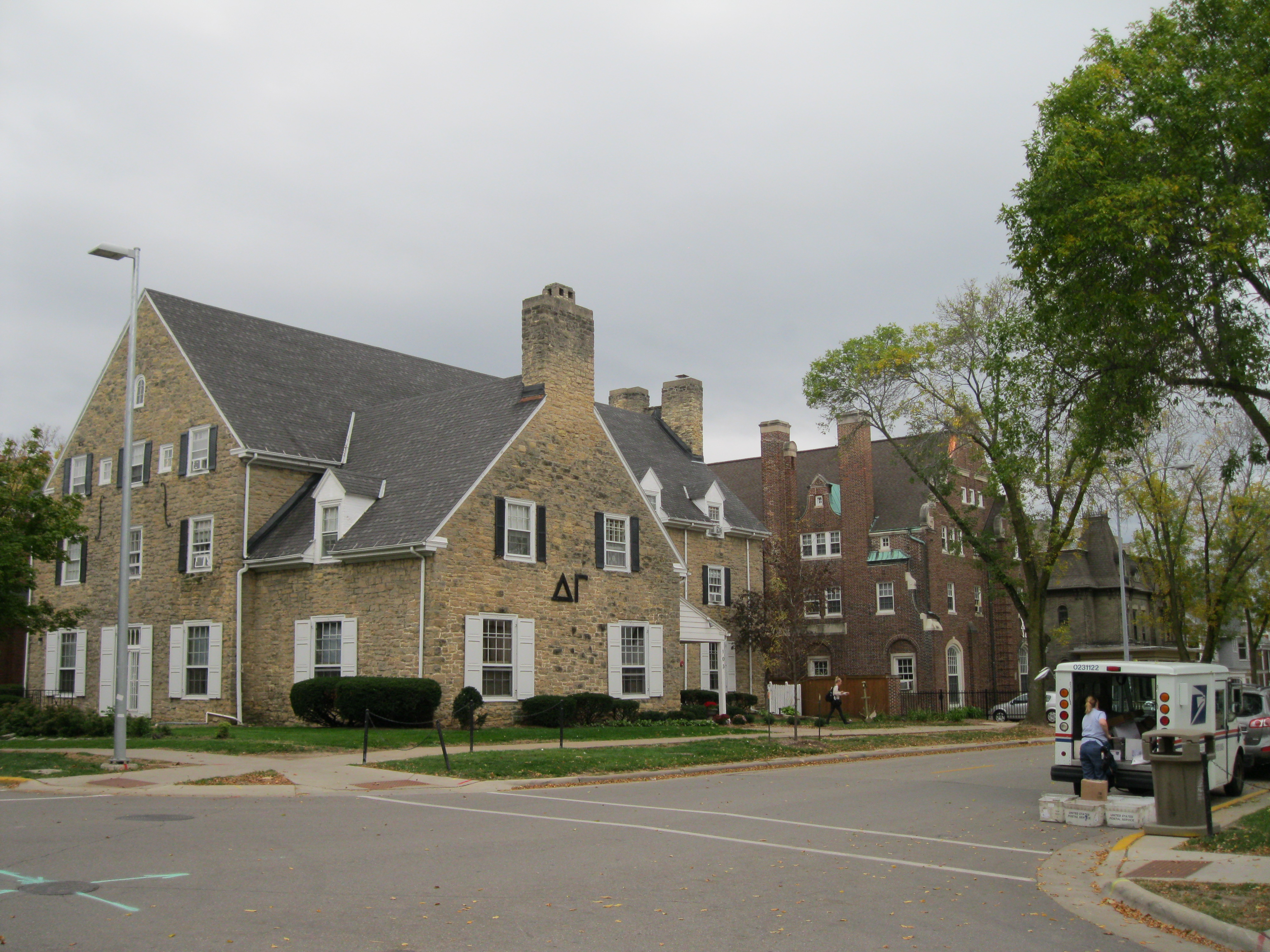
Delta Gamma sorority, 1926, Colonial Revival

- Delta Gamma sorority house (1926), 103 Langdon St, Madison, Colonial Revival, contributes to Langdon Street Historic District.

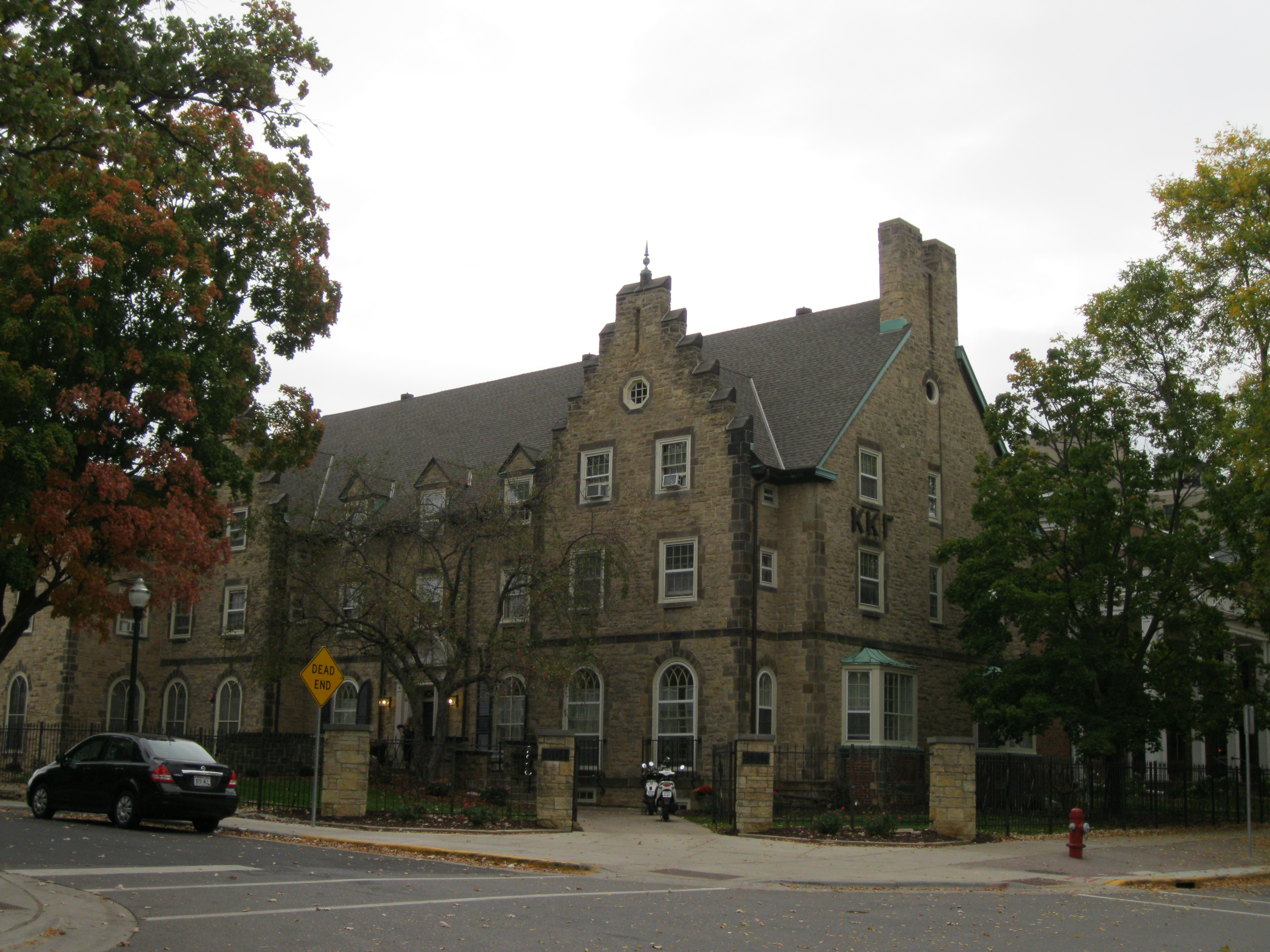
Kappa Kappa Gamma, 1929, German Renaissance Revival

- Kappa Kappa Gamma sorority house (1929), 601 N Henry St, Madison, German Renaissance Revival, contributes to Langdon Street Historic District.
- First Church of Christ, Scientist (1929), 315 Wisconsin Ave., Madison, Wisconsin. Classical Revival.

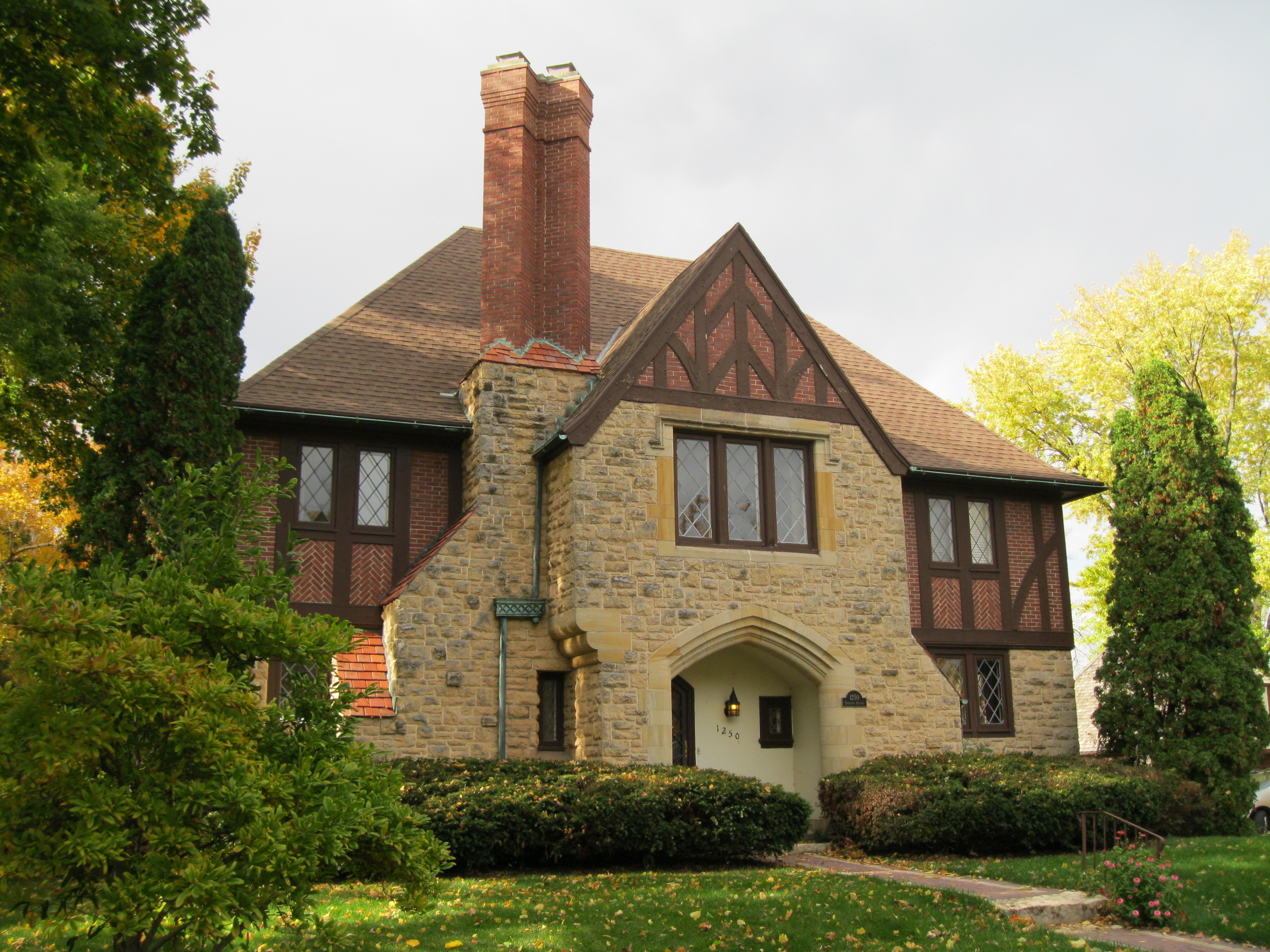
Warner house, 1929, Tudor Revival

- Harry Warner house (1929), 1250 Sherman Avenue, Tudor Revival, contributes to the Sherman Avenue Historic District.
- One or more works in Jefferson Avenue Historic District, bounded by Oakland, Garfield and Ruger Aves. and Forest Park Blvd. Janesville, WI
- One or more works in Main Street Historic District, roughly bounded by Main, Ann, Louisa and Wells Sts. Darlington, WI
- One or more works in Shorewood Historic District, roughly bounded by Lake Mendota Dr., Tallyho Ln., Shorewood Blvd., and the Blackhawk Country Club Village of Shorewood Hills, WI
- Four works in College Hills Historic District, Madison, Wisconsin:
  - Prof. Gustave L. & Marion Larson House 1213, Sweetbriar Rd. (1914)
  - Mark & Beatrice Goldberg House, 2802 Colgate Rd. (1936)
  - G. Frederick & Elizabeth Wolff Jr. House, 3006 Harvard Dr. (1936)
  - Leslie A. Yolton House, 2915 Colgate Rd. (1939).
- Lawrence P. & Catherine M. (Leisz) Rudd building (residences), 1423 - 1425 East Johnson Street, Madison Wisconsin. (1923)
- Madison East High School, 2222 E Washington Ave Madison, Wisconsin, an example of the Collegiate Gothic style (1922)
- The Wisconsin state Governor's Executive Residence (Mansion), 99 Cambridge Road in the Village of Maple Bluff, Wisconsin, designed in the southern Classical Revival style (1920)
- Otto and Louise Schroeder House, 4811 Tonyawatha Trail, Monona, WI, Tudor Revival (1932)
