= First Church of Christ, Scientist (Madison, Wisconsin) =

Historic church in Wisconsin, United States

- First Church of Christ Scientist
- U.S. National Register of Historic Places
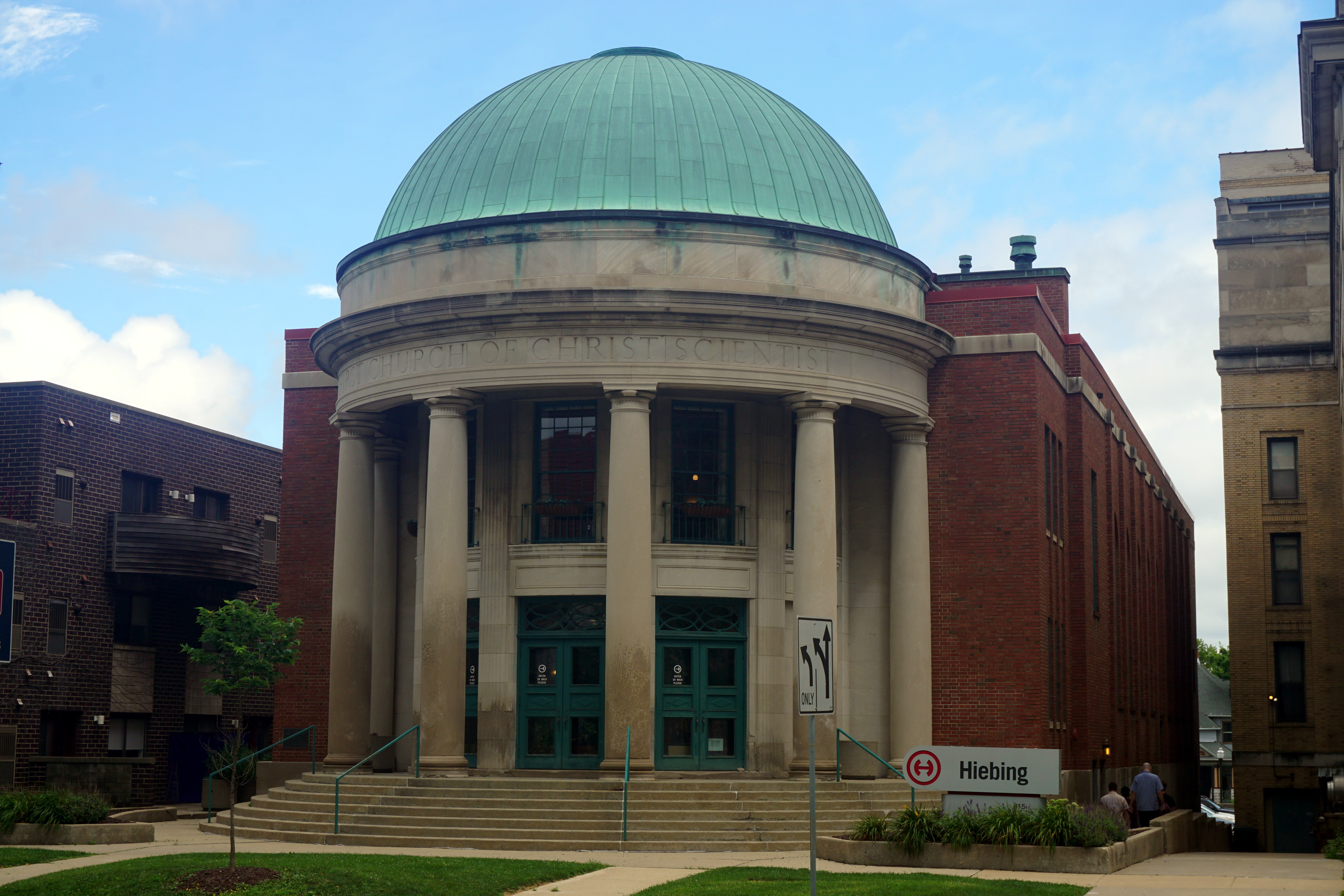
- First Church of Christ, Scientist

- Location within Wisconsin Location within the United States
- Location: 315 Wisconsin Avenue, Madison, Wisconsin
- Coordinates: 43°4′38.53″N 89°23′12.96″W
- Built: 1929
- Architect: Frank M. Riley
- Architectural style: Classical Revival
- NRHP reference No.: 82001841
- Added to NRHP: November 24, 1982

The former First Church of Christ Scientist, is an historic Christian Science church building located at 315 Wisconsin Avenue, Madison, Wisconsin, United States. Built in 1929, it was designed in the Classical Revival-style by noted Madison architect Frank M. Riley. In 1982 the building was added to the National Register of Historic Places.

Mary Baker Eddy organized the first Christian Scientist congregation in Boston in 1879. Members of the sect began to organize in Madison about five years later, in the mid 1880s. They initially met informally in members' homes, but in 1895 they formally organized and began to meet in the Gates of Heaven Synagogue on West Washington. With more growth, the congregation shifted meetings to the Women's Building.

In 1912 the congregation bought the lot where the church now stands. It was the former home of Wisconsin Supreme Court Justice J.H. Carpenter, and they started a reading room in his house. In 1918 a group broke off from the congregation and formed Second Church of Christ Scientist in Madison, meeting at 263 Langdon Street, but in 1927 they merged back together. In 1929 the reunited congregation finally built the church at 315 Wisconsin - the subject of this article. Many of Madison's historic churches were on the same avenue, before lack of parking forced them to other locations.

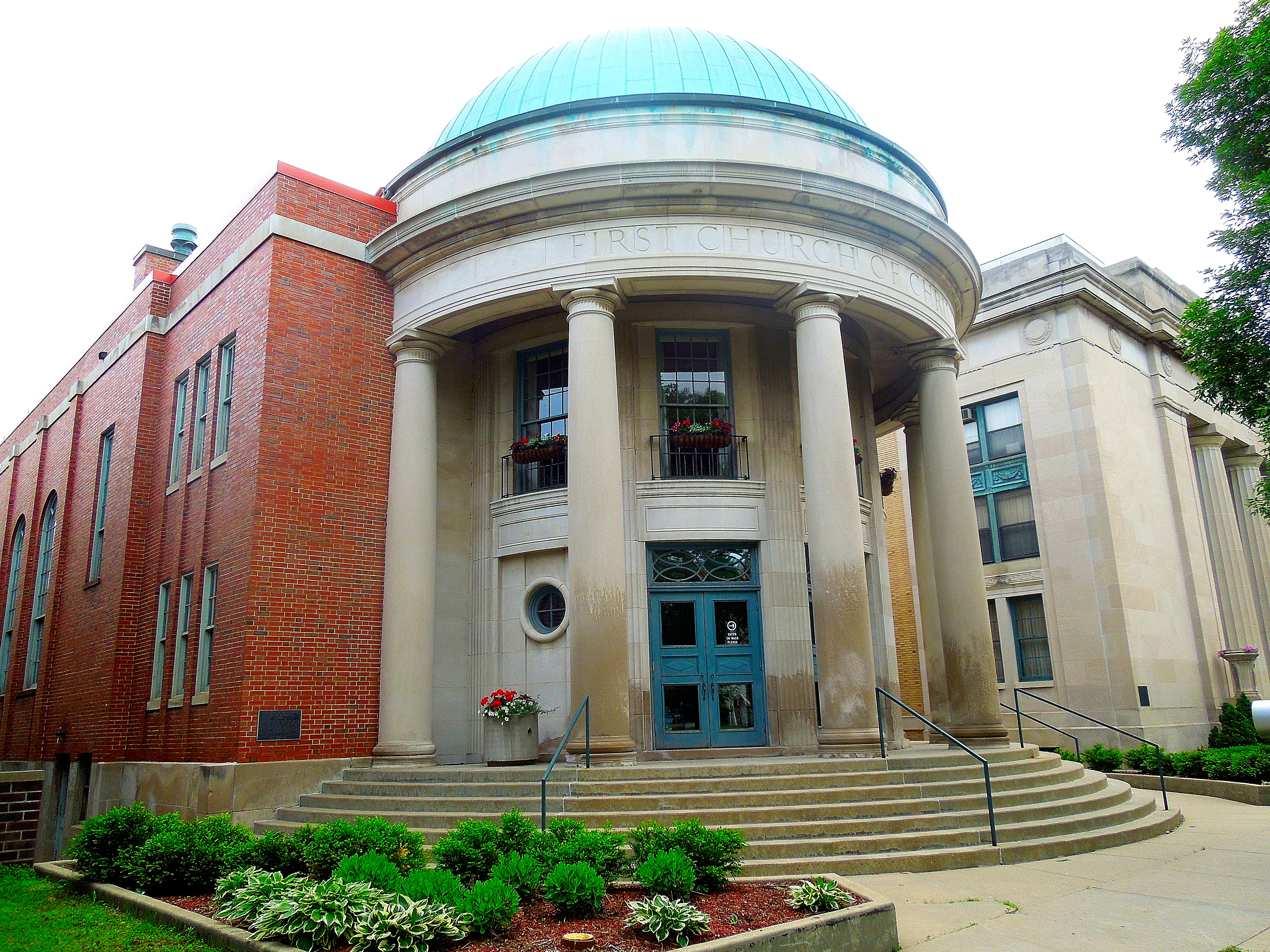

They hired Frank Morris Riley, a prominent Madison architect who had designed the governor's mansion in 1920. For the Christian Scientists he designed a Neoclassical structure with a graceful dome on four Doric columns over the front entry. (Christian Science churches built at that time often looked like Roman temples.) A paper at the time described the new building:

...the church on Wisconsin Avenue [was] built with dignified simplicity and grace along the lines of Georgian architecture... Built to accommodate 850 people, the most imposing edifice is equipped with opera-like seats in walnut brown to blend with the speaker's pulpit. There is a large Sunday School room on the lower floor and a reading room on the second floor. Large stone pillars quarried in one place, the only kind in the city, grace the entrance lending an attractive colonial atmosphere. Red brick and limestone constitute the exterior construction, while the interior walls are decorated in a cream color finish. The floor is of terrazzo.

The NRHP nomination observes, "The design of the interior conveys a feeling of serenity by its almost Puritan simplicity." The reading room's ceiling was the inside of the front dome, with a Georgian fireplace and French doors.

In 1982 the building was added to the NRHP as one of the finest church designs in Madison and as a major work of Frank Riley, one of Madison's major architects of the first half of the 20th century. The building is now occupied by Hiebing, a marketing and advertising agency. First Church of Christ, Scientist's congregation now holds services at 610 South Segoe Road.
