= University Heights Historic District (Madison, Wisconsin) =

Historic district in Wisconsin, United States

- U.S. National Register of Historic Places
- U.S. Historic district
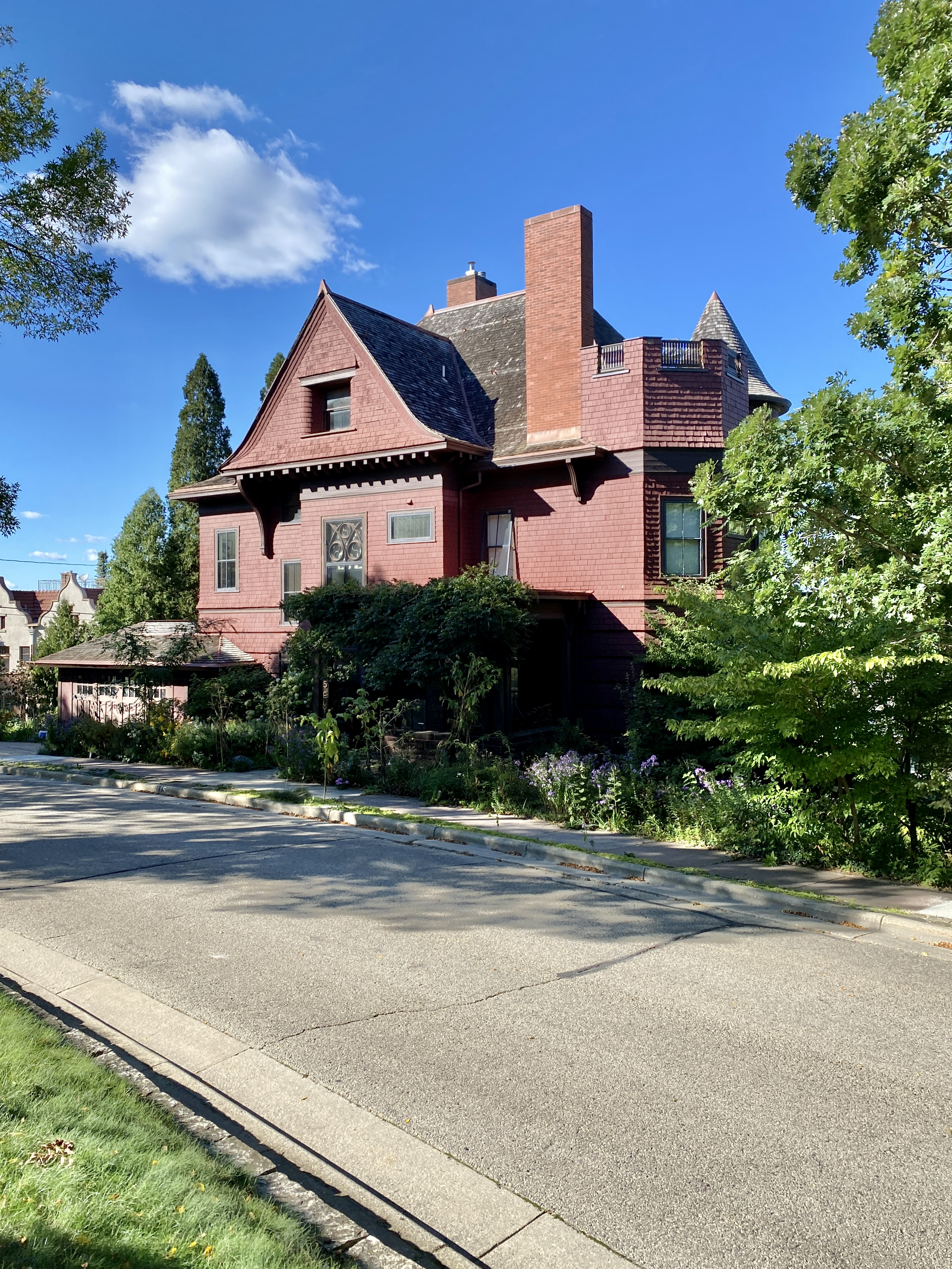
- Buell house, Queen Anne style with Shingle style influence, 1894

- Location within Wisconsin Location within the United States
- Location: Roughly bounded by Regent, Allen, Lathrop Sts., and Kendall Ave. (both sides), Madison, Wisconsin
- Coordinates: 43°4′12″N 89°25′8″W
- Area: 101.4 acres (41.0 ha)
- NRHP reference No.: 82001844
- Added to NRHP: December 17, 1982

University Heights Historic District is a historic neighborhood on the west side of Madison, Wisconsin. The 397 contributing structures were built from 1894 to 1965 - many by prominent University of Wisconsin faculty - in various styles of the period, and the subdivision was Madison's first elite residential suburb. In 1982 the district was added to the National Register of Historic Places, considered important for the various architectural styles it contains and for its association with the important people who have lived there.

== History ==
Before settlement, the University Heights area was an oak forest draped over a 200-foot high hill - a glacial drumlin. Native Americans had constructed mounds in the area. Just prior to White settlement, Ho-Chunk people dominated the Four Lakes area.

Breese J. Stevens bought the land in 1856, along with his associates in Madison and family in New York. He was a corporate lawyer, president of Madison Land and Lumber Company, and would become mayor of Madison in 1884. Along with this parcel, the group owned other land on the west side of Madison. During the Civil War soldiers from Camp Randall cut the trees on the east end of the area for firewood. The area was pastured for decades after. Then in 1893, Stevens sold the 106 acre parcel to the University Heights Company.

The University Heights Company was led by William T. Fish and Burr W. Jones. Fish was a contractor and developer who had started the nearby Wingra Park subdivision in 1892. Jones was a prominent attorney. Their real estate venture was encouraged by the fact that the university was in the process of buying Camp Randall, just to the east, for expansion. Also, the Madison City Railways Company was expected to approach the area, providing an easy way to commute into town in this era before automobiles. Their company paid $53,000 for the 106 acres in March of 1893 and quickly platted streets and lots that curved to follow the contour of the hill - the first curvilinear plat in Madison. By May 28th, half the lots were already sold.

Suburbs were a fairly new thing at the time. The city of Madison was over fifty years old, and the center around the capitol was becoming congested and expensive. Madison's first suburb, South Madison, had been established in 1889, only four years earlier. The University Heights subdivision was then outside the city limits and cars were still rare. When the first house was built there in 1894, it stood alone on top of the bald hill, and wags called it "Buell's Folly." But the new subdivision filled in and was annexed by the city in 1903, proving the wags wrong. But it took a while.

The opening of the subdivision coincided with the Panic of 1893, an economic depression. Despite fast early sales of lots, only sixteen houses had been built by 1900. Nine were small houses built by UW farm workers and tradesmen on the northern edge of the plat. Six were large stylish houses built in the east slope of the hill by UW faculty. Rapid growth began after the panic abated and the suburb was annexed by Madison on 1903, guaranteeing city services.

== Example properties in the district ==
These are listed roughly in the order built, following roughly the same progression of styles as the rest of the U.S.

- Charles and Martha Buell's house at 115 Ely Place was the first built in the new subdivision, in 1894. It is a large Queen Anne-style house with Shingle-style influence, designed by Conover and Porter and sited on the crown of University Heights' hill.
- The Homer Winthrop Hillyer house at 1811 Kendall Ave. is a Shingle-style house built in 1895 and 1896. Hillyer was a chemistry professor at the UW.

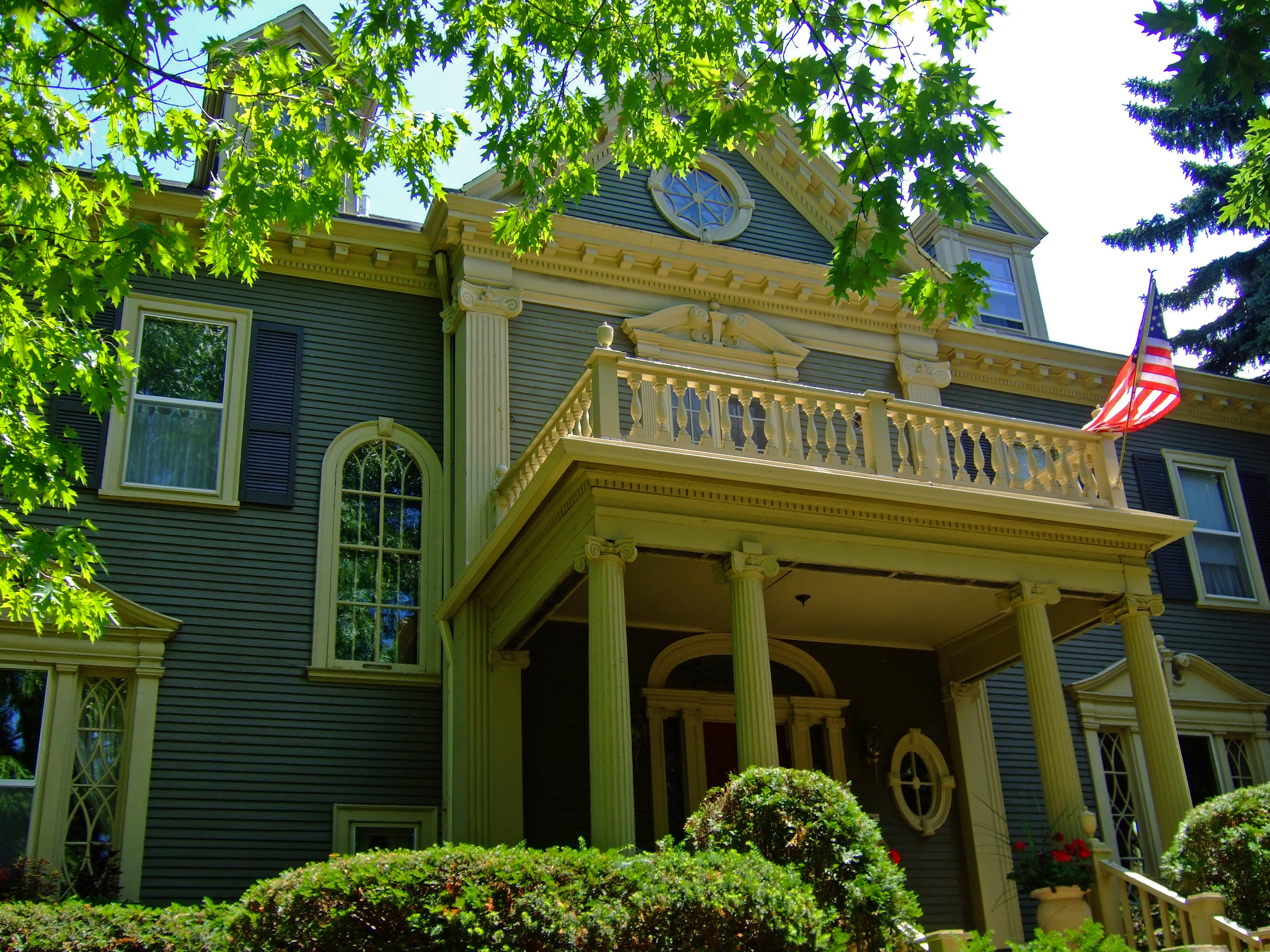
Ely house, Georgian Revival, 1896

- The Richard T. Ely House at 205 N Prospect Ave was designed by Charles Sumner Frost in Georgian Revival style and built in 1896. Hallmarks of the style are the symmetry, the fanlight and sidelights surrounding the door, and the broken pediments. Ely was a professor of economics and a leading progressive.
- The Prof. Balthasar H. Meyer house at 1937 Arlington Place was designed by Claude and Starck in American Foursquare style and built in 1902. Its big horizontal lines show Prairie School influence. The house was later the home of Professor Richard S. McCaffrey, who invented a process for removing sulphur from iron ore, and later yet, Midge Miller, a state legislator who worked for peace and women's rights.

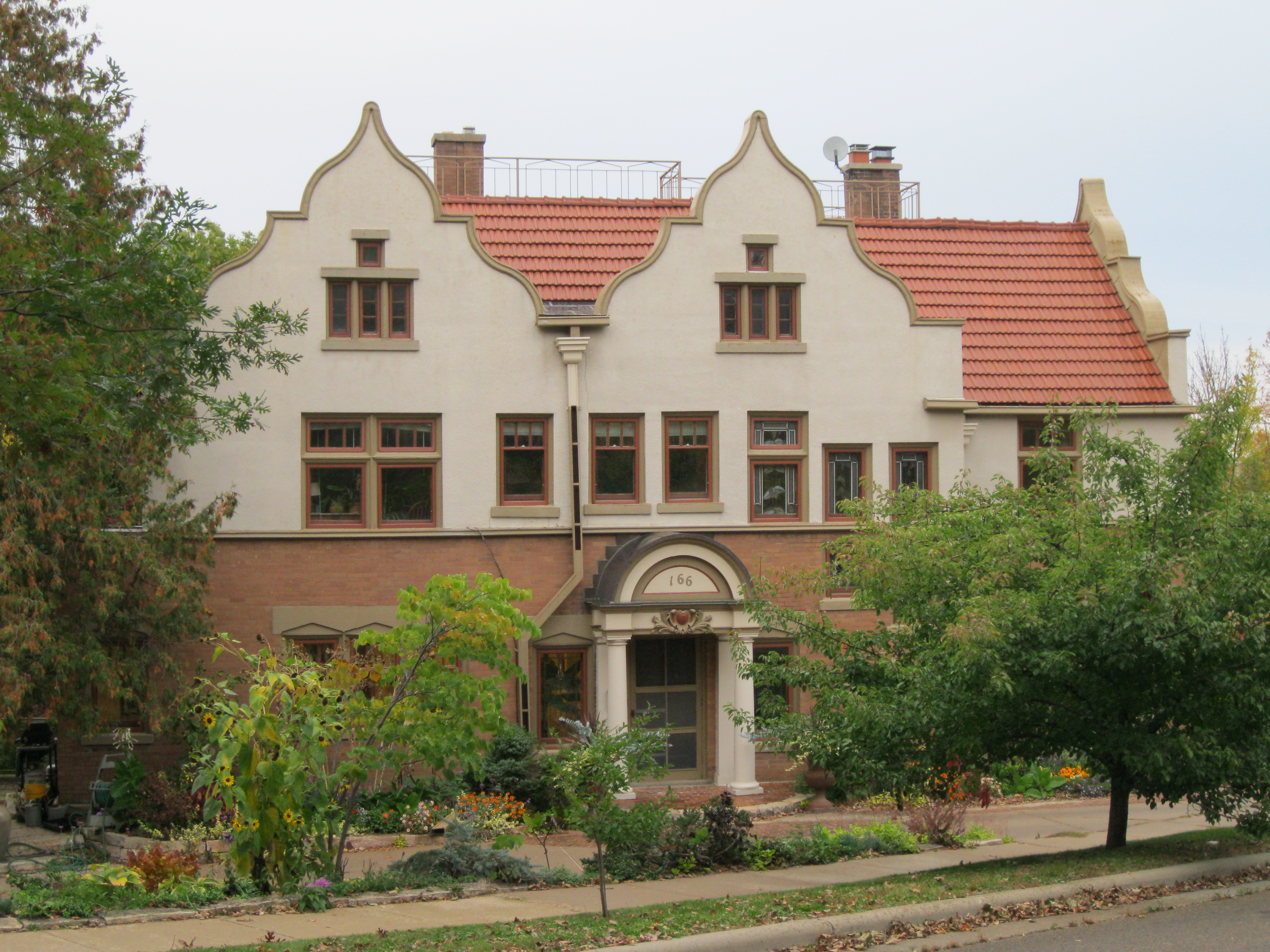
Turneaure house, Dutch Colonial Revival, 1905

- The Frederick E. Turneaure house at 166 N Prospect Ave was designed by J.T.W. Jennings in Dutch Colonial Revival style and built in 1905. The shaped parapets on the gable ends are a hallmark of the style. Frederick was a professor of engineering who was an authority on bridge construction and dean of the College of Mechanics and Engineering.

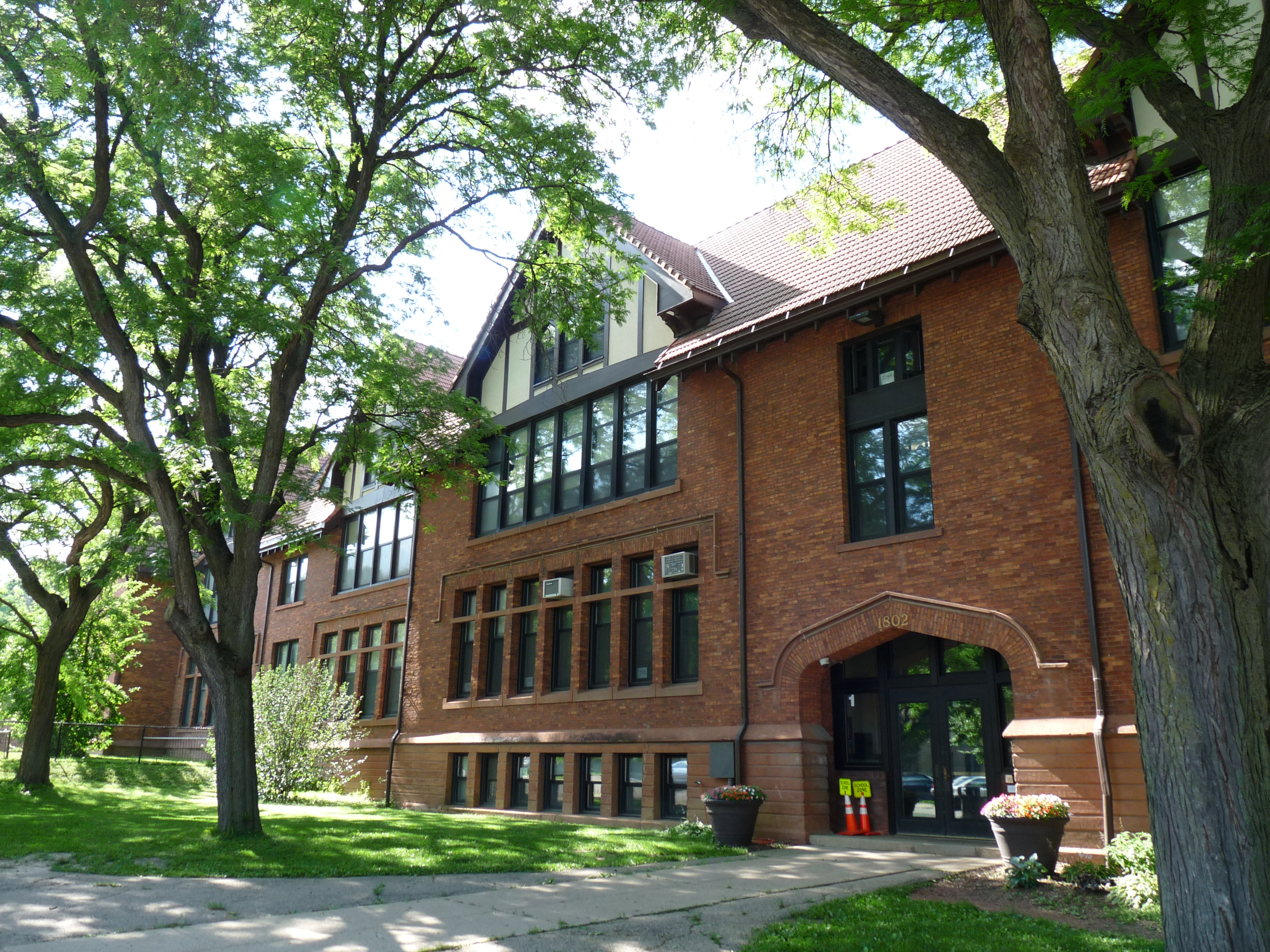
Randall School, Tudor Revival/Craftsman, 1906

- The Randall School at 1802 Regent Street was designed by Alvan Small in a simplified Tudor Revival/Craftsman style and built in 1906, as the school-age population in the neighborhood was growing. The center three bays on Spooner Street are the original building; additions in 1912 and 1925 continued the design. Randall Elementary is now Madison's oldest school in continuous operation.

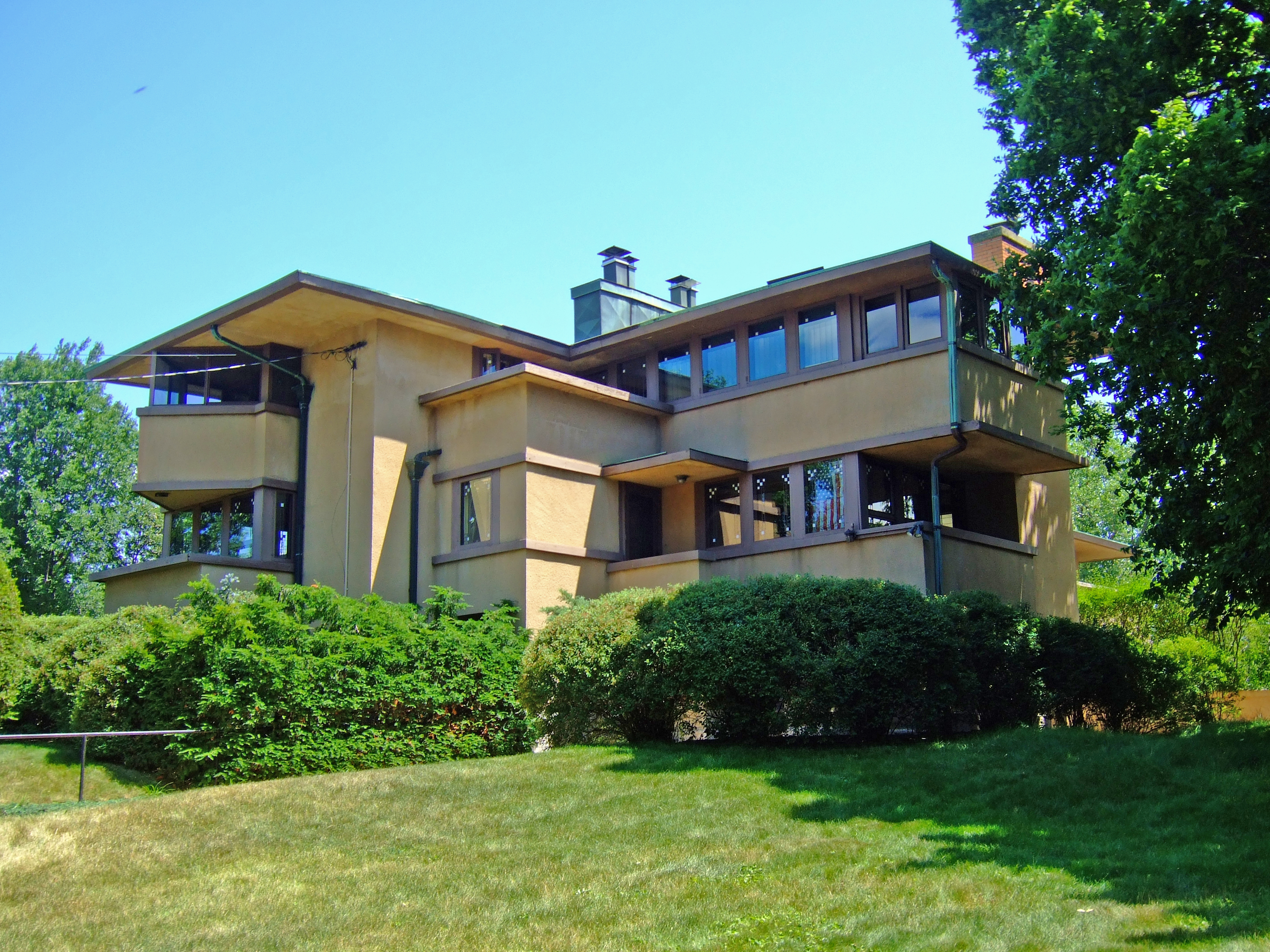
Gilmore house, Prairie School, 1908

- The Eugene A. Gilmore House at 120 Ely Place is a Prairie School house designed by Frank Lloyd Wright and built in 1908, with a cruciform footprint and horizontal bands that have given it the name "the Airplane House." Gilmore was a law professor at the UW.

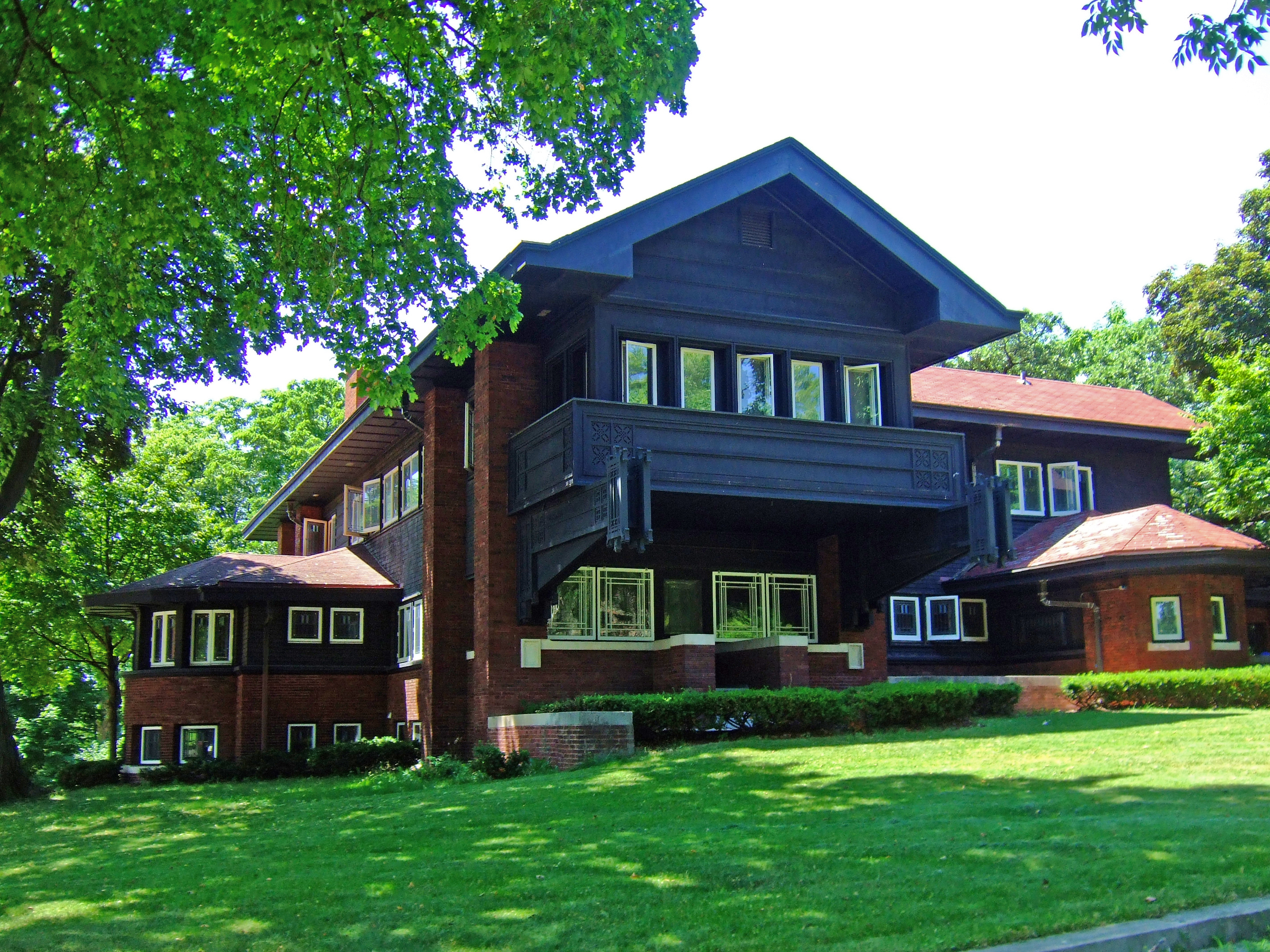
Bradley house, Prairie School, 1909

- The Harold and Josephine Bradley House at 106 N Prospect Ave is a Prairie School house designed by Louis Sullivan and George Elmslie and built in 1909, with sleeping porches and overhangs. Bradley was a professor at the UW and Josephine was the daughter of Richard T. Crane, plumbing supply magnate, who built the house as a wedding gift for the couple.

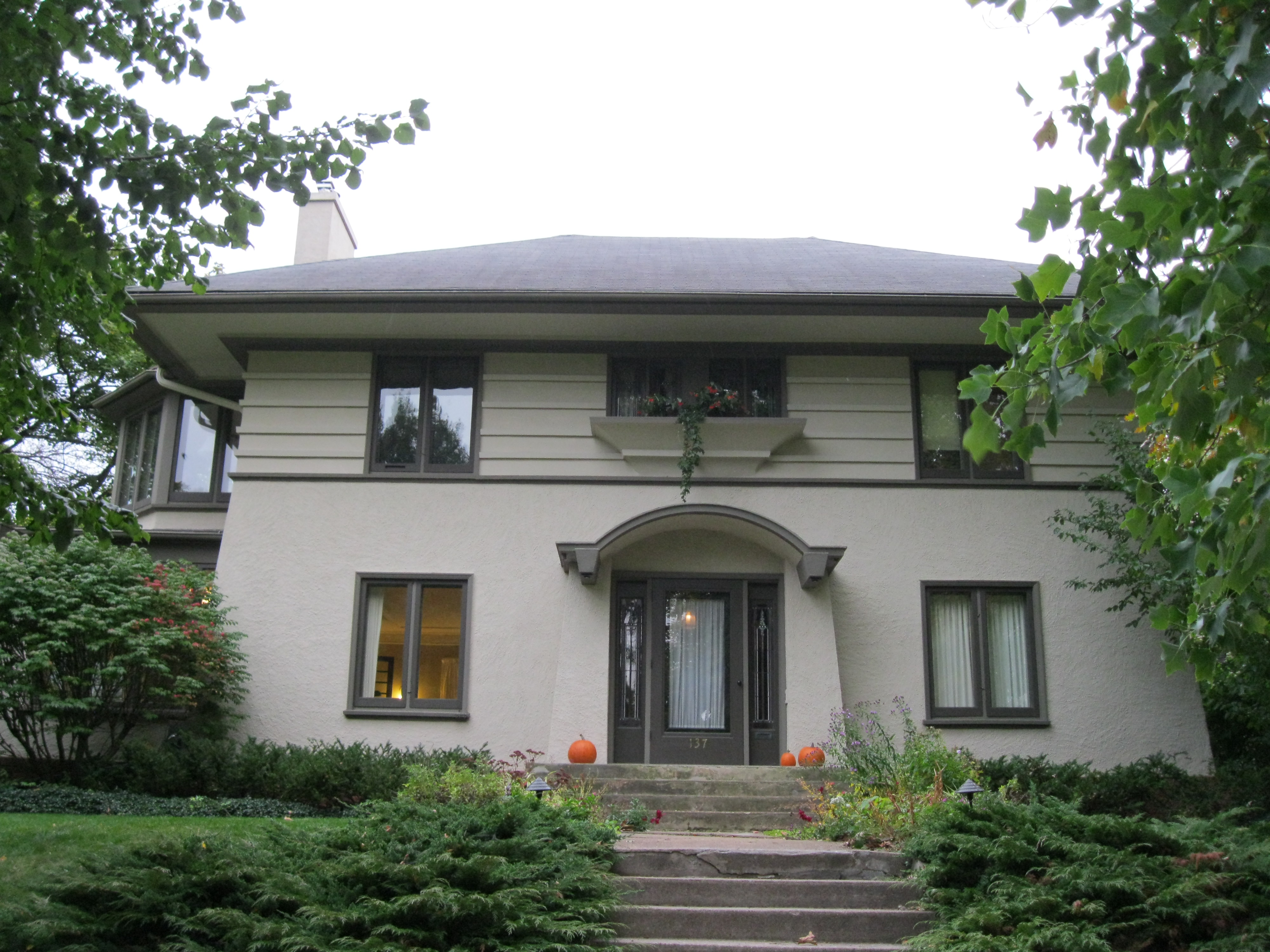
Elliott house, Prairie School, 1910

- The Edward C. Elliott House at 137 N Prospect Ave. was designed in Prairie School style by George W. Maher and built in 1910. The design has the broad eaves and horizontal emphasis typical of Prairie style, along with the arched porch roof that was a Maher trademark. Edward Elliot was a professor of education who was key in developing the UW's demonstration school, Wisconsin High. Elliot was followed in the house by Ralph Hess, an associate professor of political economy, and he by Chester Snell, the dean of the UW-extension.

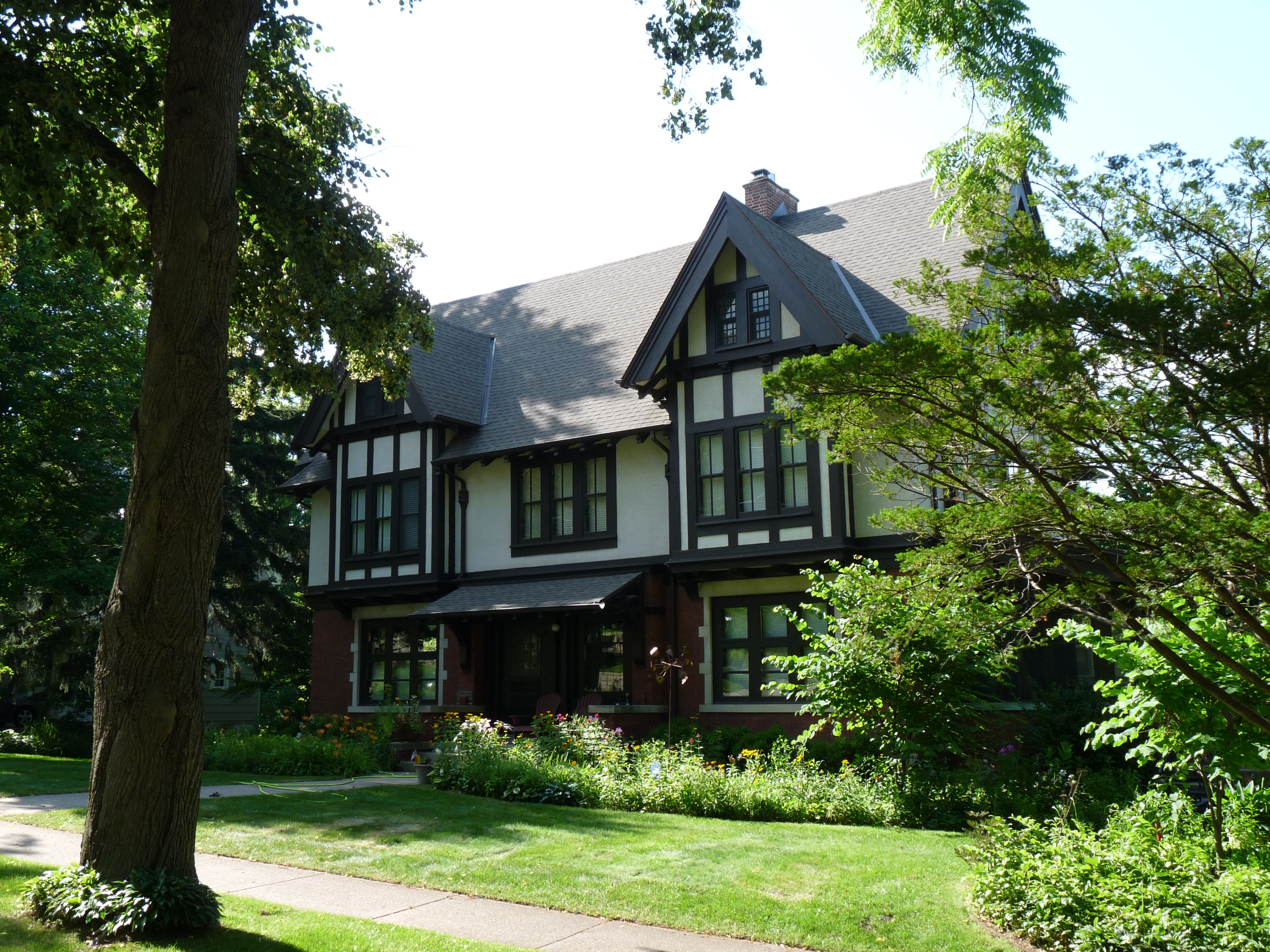
Pence house, Tudor Revival, 1910

- The William D. Pence house at 168 N Prospect Ave was designed in Tudor Revival style by Claude and Starck and built in 1910. Pence was a professor of railway engineering. Later the house was the home of Arlie Schorger, professor of wildlife ecology.

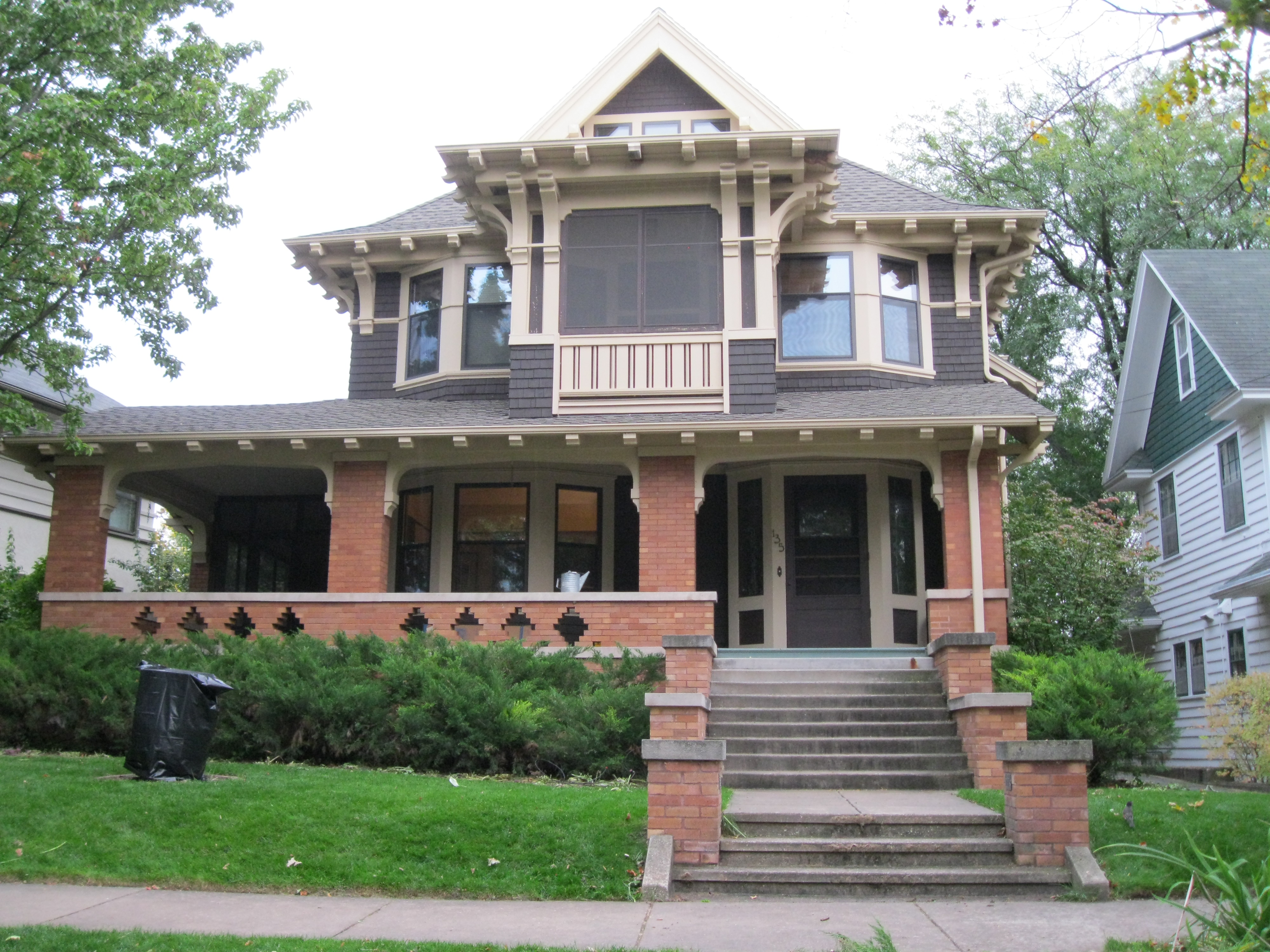
Tiemann house, Craftsman, 1911

- The Harry D. Tiemann house at 135 N Prospect Ave is a Craftsman-style house designed by Claude and Starck and built in 1911. Exposed rafter tails are a hallmark of the style present in this house. The style of the house looks older than 1911 because the Tiemanns had it built it to resemble their previous house in Connecticut. Tiemann was involved in the Forest Products Lab.

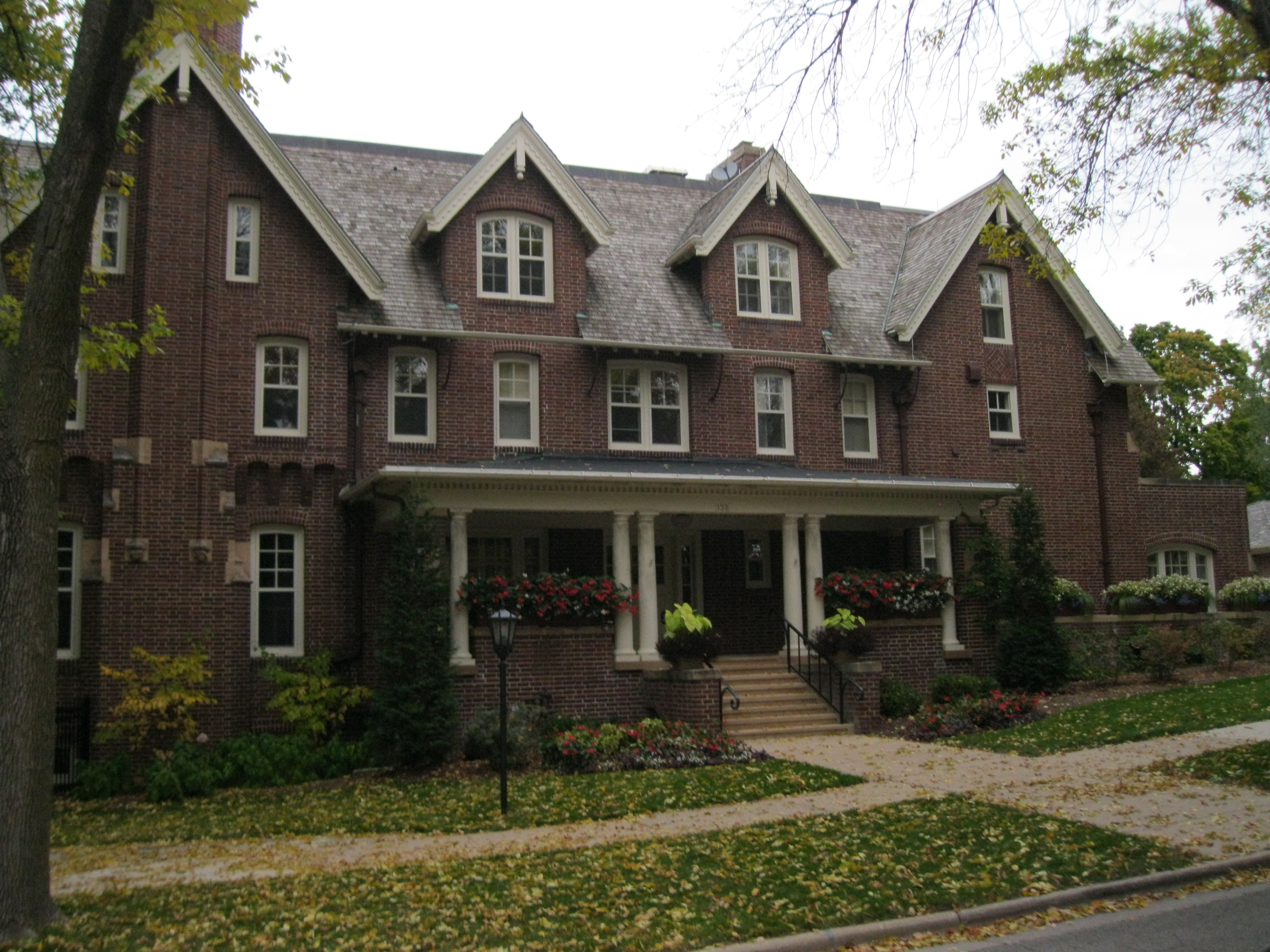
Olin house, Tudor Revival, 1912

- The John Myers Olin house at 130 N Prospect Ave was designed by Ferry & Clas in Tudor Revival style and built in 1912. Olin and his wife Helen had this house built when their previous home on the site of the Wisconsin Union was being crowded by the growing UW. John was an attorney and the leader of the Wisconsin Park and Pleasure Drive Association, which started Madison's park system.

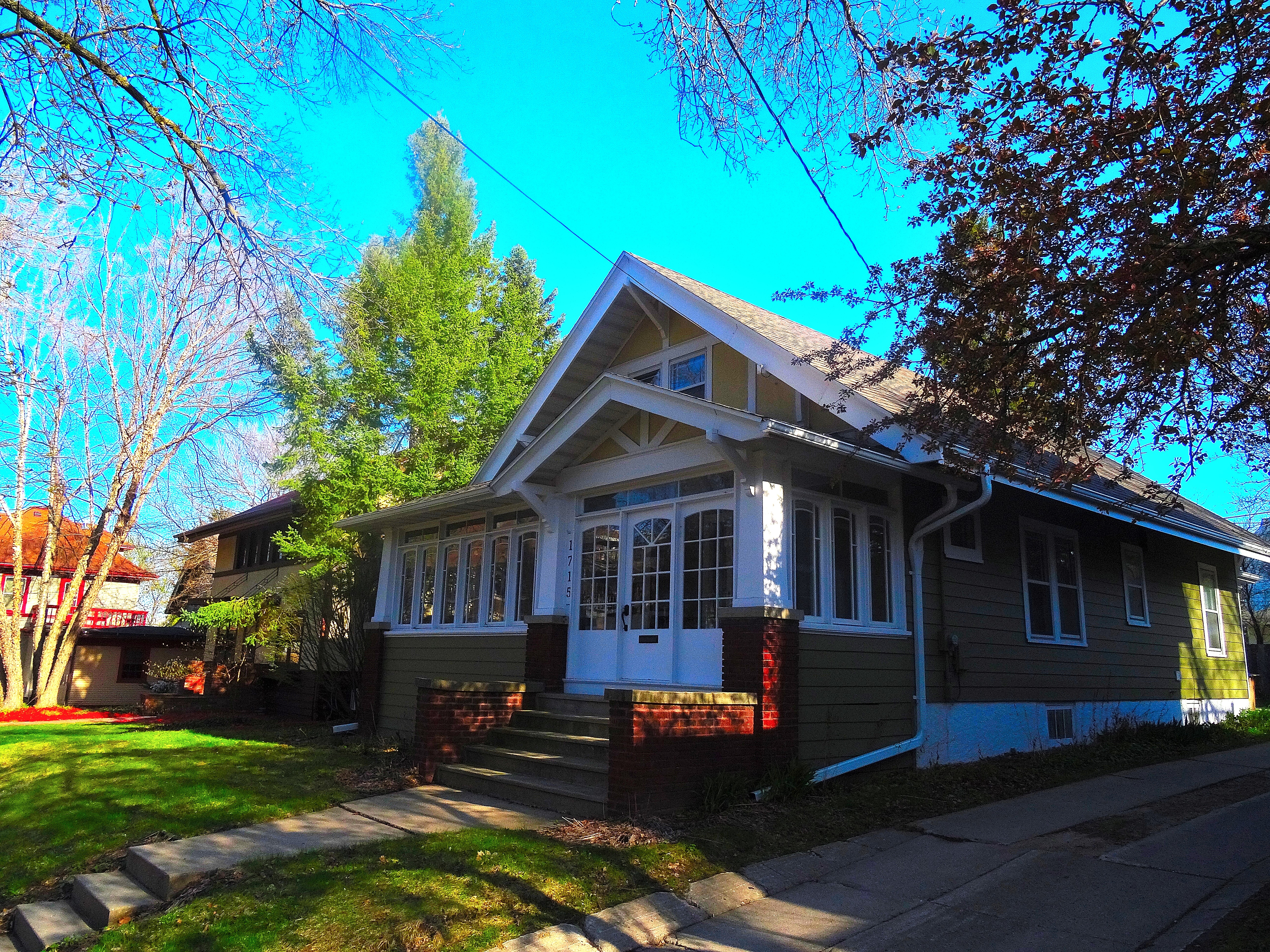
Ulve house, Bungalow, 1914

- The Edward M. Ulve house at 1715 Chadbourne Avenue is a bungalow built in 1914.

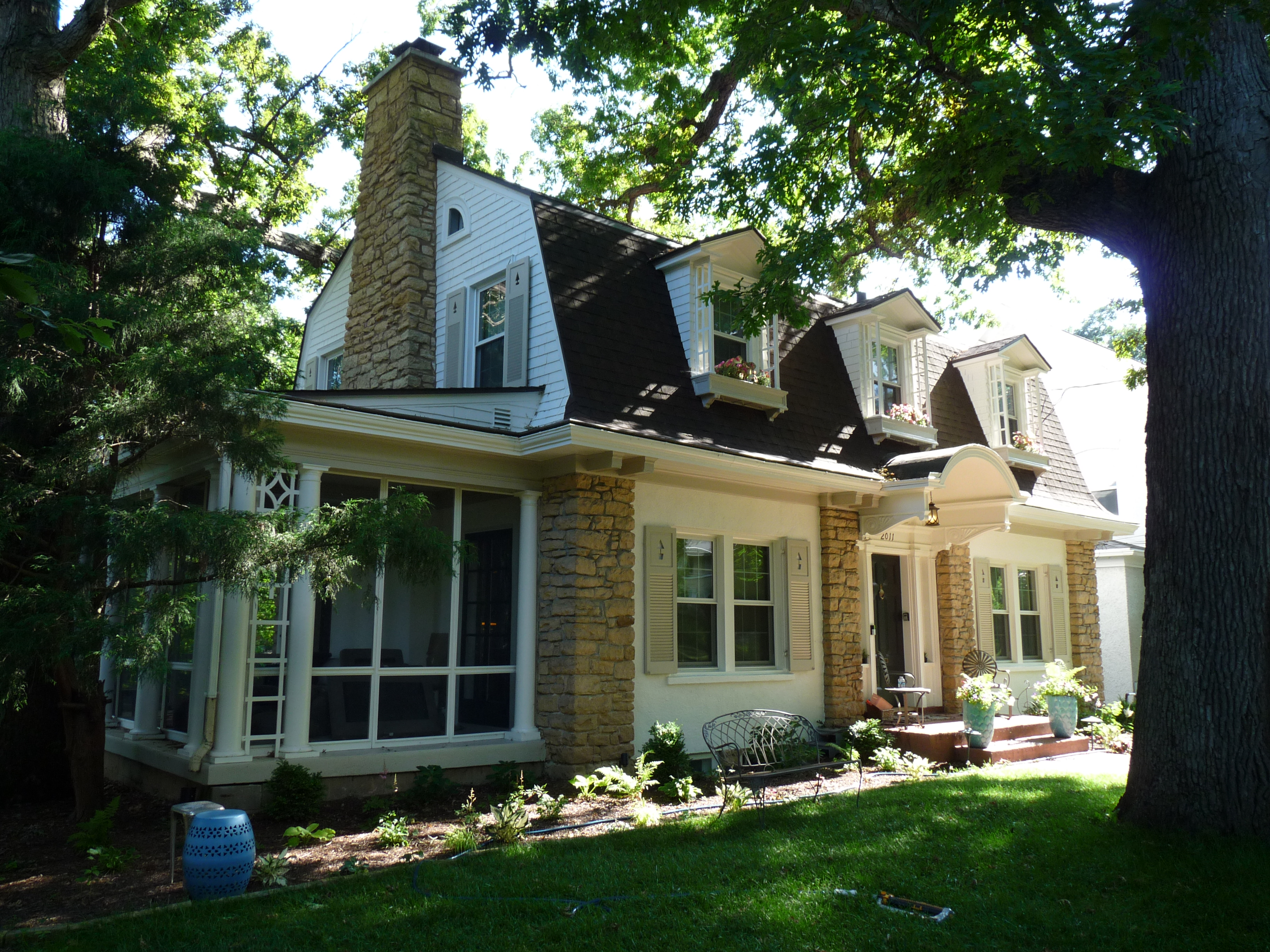
James Law's first house, Dutch Colonial Revival, 1915

- The James R. Law house at 2011 Van Hise Ave is a Dutch Colonial Revival-style house designed by Law, Law & Potter for the firm's founding partner James, and built in 1915. Hallmarks of the style are the gambrel roof, the formal symmetry, and the classical details like the columns on the sun porch. James Law would go on to be mayor of Madison and chairman of Wisconsin's highway commission. After Law, the house was the home of Professor Edward Asahel Birge, the "father of modern limnology."
- The Ross W. Harris house at 8 N Prospect Ave was designed in Tudor Revival style by Frank M. Riley and built in 1923. Hallmarks of the style present in this house are the false half-timbering, the many-paned windows, and the massive chimneys. Harris was a construction engineer.

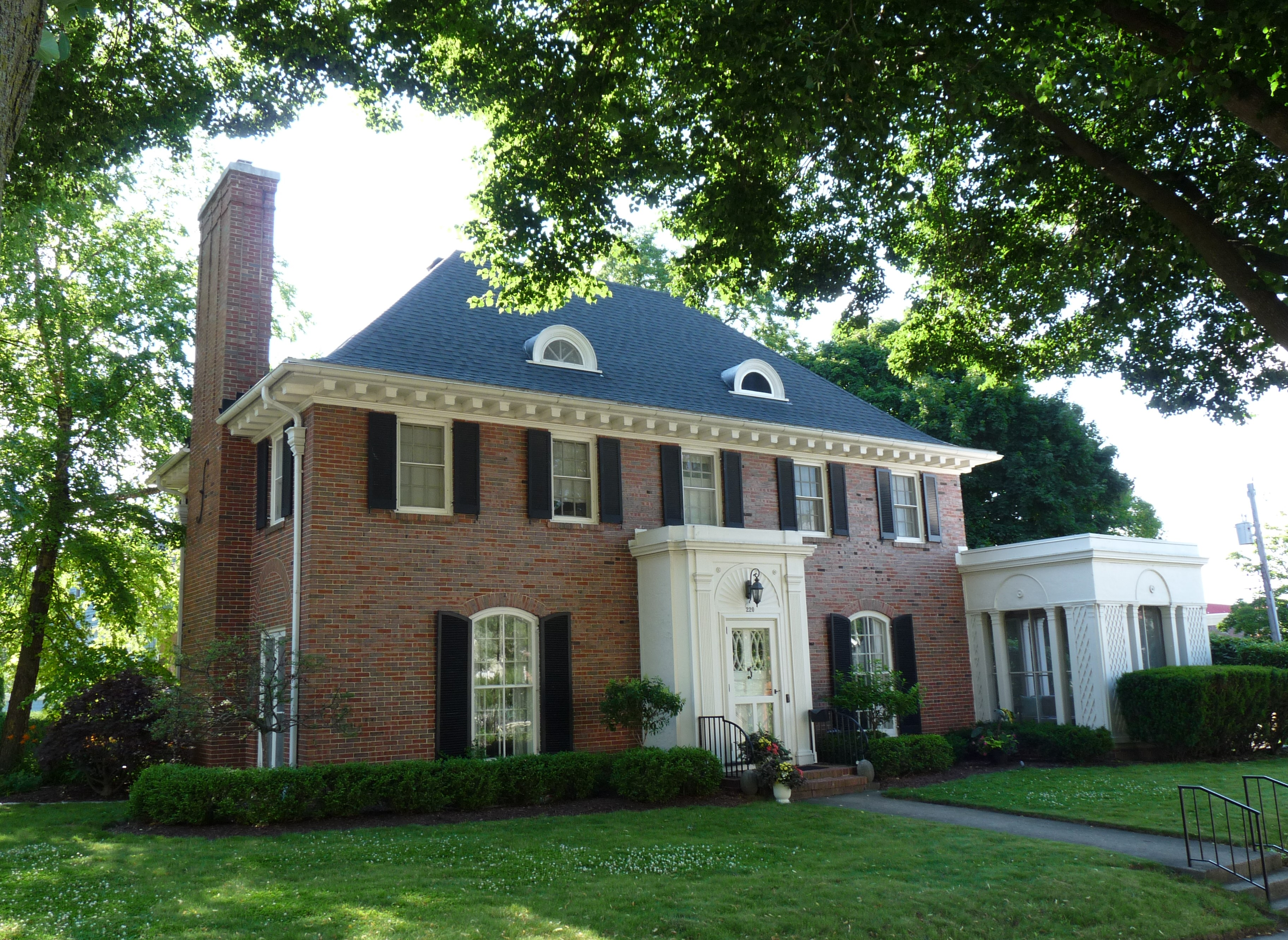
Moore house, Georgian Revival, 1923

- The Maud and Howard O. Moore house at 220 N Prospect Ave was designed by Frank M. Riley in Georgian Revival style and built in 1923.

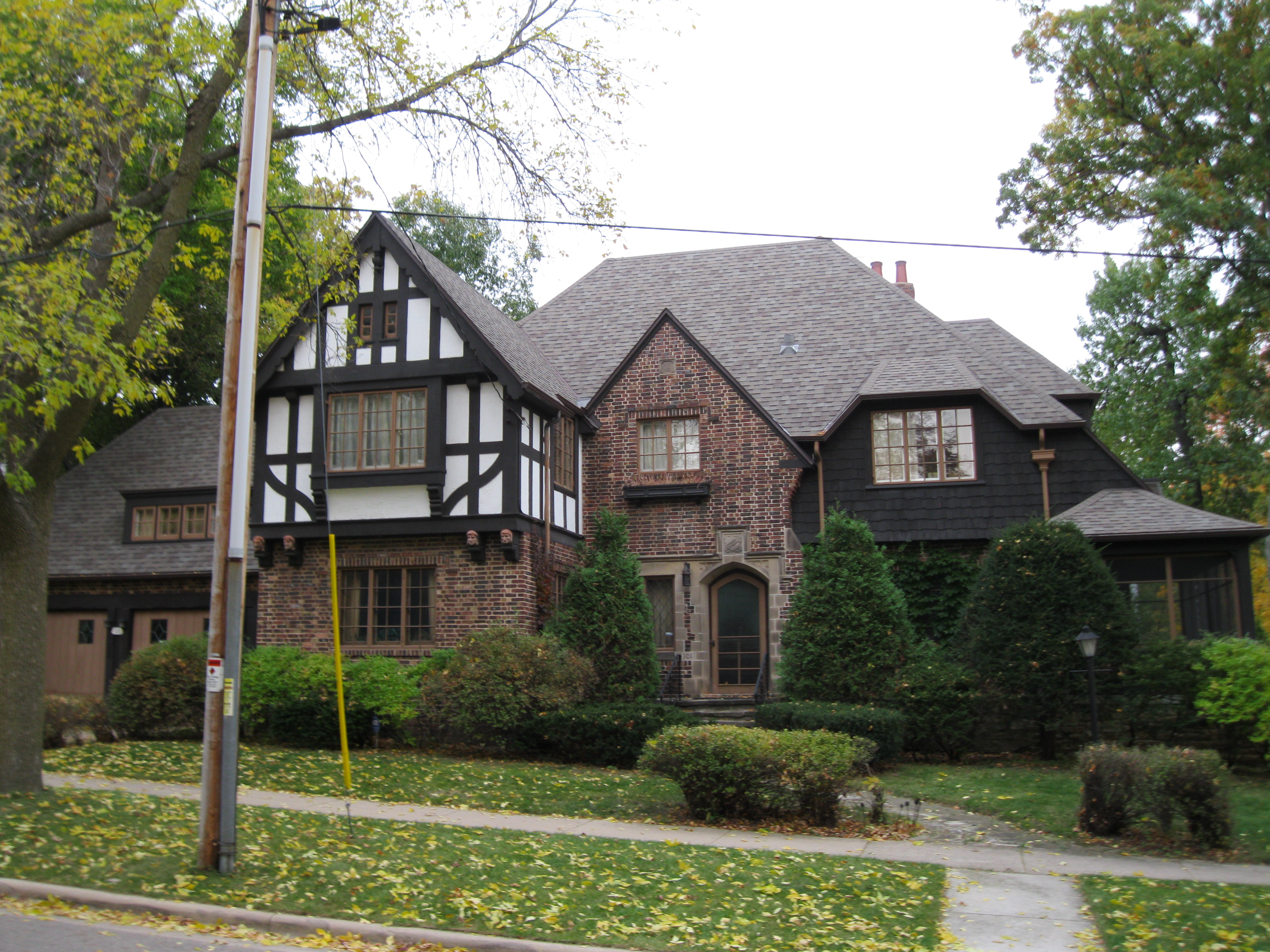
James Law's 2nd house, Tudor Revival, 1925

- The James R. Law House at 101 N Prospect Ave is a Tudor Revival house designed by architect James and his brother Edward. It is James' second home in the district.

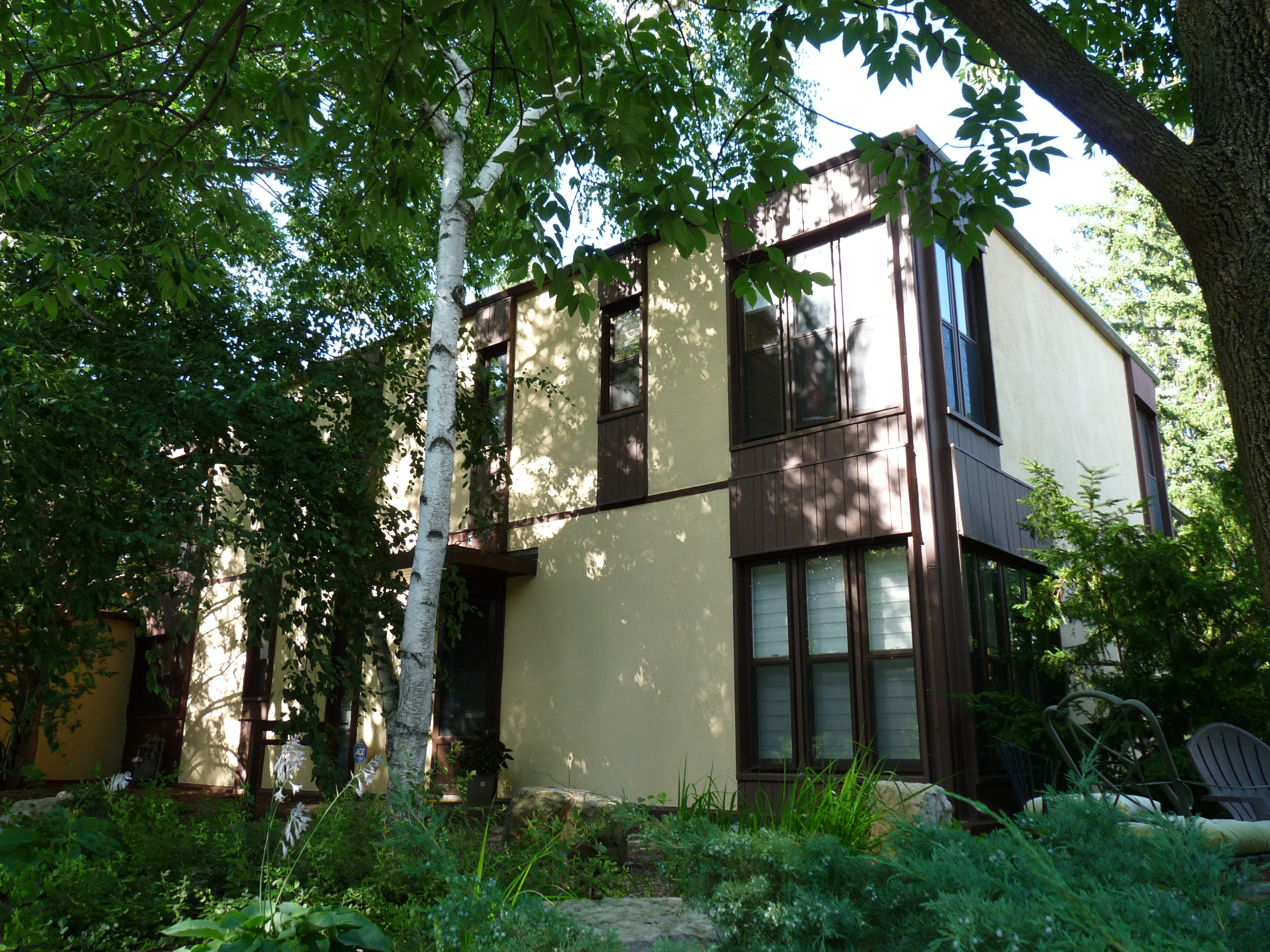
Morehouse house, International style, 1937

- The Edward and Anna Morehouse house at 101 Ely Place was designed by George Fred Keck in International Style with simple shapes and lines and built in 1937. Edward was an official with the Public Service Commission.
