= John J. Suhr House =

Historic house in Wisconsin, United States

- U.S. National Register of Historic Places
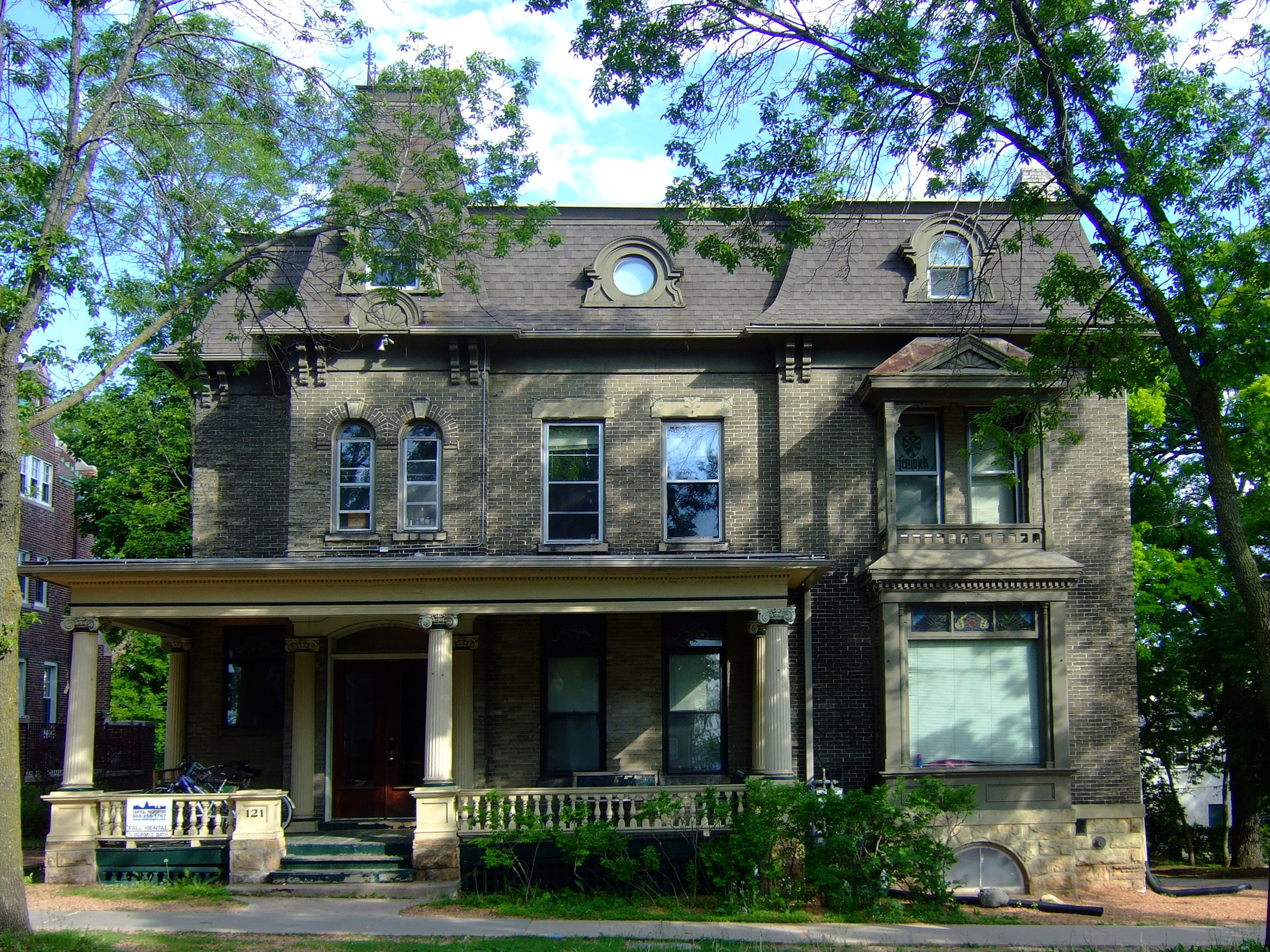

- Location within Wisconsin Location within the United States
- Location: 121 Langdon St., Madison, Wisconsin
- Coordinates: 43°4′38″N 89°23′27″W
- Area: 0.2 acres (0.081 ha)
- Built: 1886, 1902 addition
- Architect: John Nader
- Architectural style: Second Empire
- NRHP reference No.: 82000660
- Added to NRHP: June 17, 1982

The John J. Suhr House is a historic house designed in Second Empire style and built in 1886 for an early banker six blocks northwest of the capitol square in Madison, Wisconsin, United States. In 1982 it was added to the National Register of Historic Places, considered significant for its association with Suhr, an early banker, and as one of the few remaining examples of Second Empire architecture in Madison.

== History ==
Built in 1886, the house was admitted to the National Register of Historic Places listings in Dane County, Wisconsin on June 17, 1982. The residence was built in the French Second Empire architectural style by the local prominent architect Captain John Nader, who also designed Holy Redeemer Catholic Church (1869), St. Patrick's Catholic Church (1888–89), the Suhr Bank Building (1887), and the city's first sewer system. The house features a mansard roof, stone window trim and fancy woodwork on the bays. Additional construction occurred in 1902.

The house's first owner, John J. Suhr, was born in Bremen, Germany, in 1836 and immigrated to Madison in 1857. He worked as a bookkeeper in the State Bank until 1871, when he founded the German Bank. He changed the name of the bank to the German-American Bank in 1885. John J. Suhr died in 1901. His family owned and resided in the Suhr House for two generations until the death of John J. Suhr's son, John J. Suhr Jr., in 1957.

Around 1964 Chi Omega sorority bought the Suhr house to serve as an annex to its main house behind. In 1973 Chi Omega sold the house to Higgs Investment. In 1989, it became a Alpha Xi Delta sorority house, and in 1994 it was sold to a private landlord.

The house currently serves as off-campus student housing, like the majority of the former houses on Langdon Street.
