= National Register of Historic Places listings in Madison, Wisconsin =

Location of Madison within Dane County and Wisconsin

This is a list of the National Register of Historic Places listings in Madison, Wisconsin.

This is intended to be a complete list of the properties and districts on the National Register of Historic Places in Madison, Wisconsin, United States. Latitude and longitude coordinates are provided for many National Register properties and districts; these locations may be seen together in an online map.

There are 264 properties and districts listed on the National Register in Dane County, including 11 National Historic Landmarks. The city of Madison is the location of 158 of these properties and districts, including 8 of the National Historic Landmarks; they are listed here, while the remaining properties and districts are listed separately.

This National Park Service list is complete through NPS recent listings posted September 11, 2026.

== Current listings ==
	Name on the Register	Image	Date listed	Location	City or town	Description
1	Agricultural Chemistry Building	Agricultural Chemistry Building	June 19, 1985 (#85001356)	420 Henry Mall, University of Wisconsin campus 43°04′26″N 89°24′38″W	Madison	Georgian revival-style building designed by Paul Cret and Warren Laird, built in 1912, where Elmer McCollum discovered vitamins A and B, Harry Steenbock found that vitamin D could be concentrated by irradiating food, Conrad Elvehjem isolated niacin, and Karl Link isolated the anticoagulant dicoumarol.
2	Agricultural Dean's House	Agricultural Dean's House	September 20, 1984 (#84003627)	10 Babcock Dr., University of Wisconsin campus 43°04′37″N 89°24′46″W	Madison	Queen Anne-style house built for William Arnon Henry, the first dean of the UW's College of Agriculture, designed by Conover and Porter and built in 1896. Now surrounded by Allen Centennial Gardens.
3	Agricultural Engineering Building	Agricultural Engineering Building	June 27, 1985 (#85001404)	460 Henry Mall, University of Wisconsin campus 43°04′29″N 89°24′38″W	Madison	Designed by Arthur Peabody in Georgian revival style and built 1905 to 1907, the building hosted Edward Jones' investigations of soil erosion, Floyd Duffee's exploration of rural electrification, and Aldo Leopold's new Department of Wildlife Management.
4	Agricultural Heating Station	Agricultural Heating Station	March 14, 1985 (#85000570)	1535 Observatory Dr., University of Wisconsin campus 43°04′34″N 89°24′42″W	Madison	Designed by John T.W. Jennings in exuberant (for a heating plant) Richardsonian Romanesque style, and built in 1901.
5	Agriculture Hall	Agriculture Hall	March 14, 1985 (#85000571)	1450 Linden Dr., University of Wisconsin campus 43°04′32″N 89°24′29″W	Madison	Dignified Beaux Arts-style building with an octagonal 700-seat auditorium behind, designed by John T.W. Jennings and built in 1903.
6	American Exchange Bank	American Exchange Bank	August 18, 1980 (#80000115)	1 N. Pinckney St. 43°04′33″N 89°22′59″W	Madison	Three-story sandstone business block designed by Stephen Shipman in Italian Renaissance Revival style and built in 1871 on the site where the third session of the Wisconsin Territorial legislature met in 1838.
7	American Tobacco Company Warehouses Complex	American Tobacco Company Warehouses Complex	June 26, 2003 (#03000580)	651 W. Doty St. 43°03′57″N 89°23′30″W	Madison	Pair of brick warehouses built 1899-1901 for storing and processing leaf tobacco, when it was an important crop around Madison. Claude and Starck designed the second building.
8	Badger State Shoe Company	Badger State Shoe Company	April 11, 1989 (#89000232)	123 N. Blount St. 43°04′53″N 89°22′43″W	Madison	Six-story shoe factory just northeast of the capitol, designed by Ferdinand Kronenberg utilitarian with neo-Classical styling, and built in 1910.
9	Bascom Hill Historic District	Bascom Hill Historic District	September 12, 1974 (#74000065)	Bounded by Observatory Dr., University Ave., and N. Park, Langdon, and State Sts., UW campus 43°04′31″N 89°24′06″W	Madison	Historic bits on the east side of the UW campus, including the UW's first building 1851 North Hall, 1857 Bascom Hall, the 1894 Red Gym, and the 1928 Memorial Union.
10	Robert M. Bashford House	Robert M. Bashford House	March 14, 1973 (#73000075)	423 N. Pinckney St. 43°04′44″N 89°23′14″W	Madison	Sandstone-clad Italian Villa style home built around 1858, in which Governor Edward Salomon lived, and later Robert McKee Bashford who served as mayor of Madison and on the state Supreme Court.
11	Baskerville Apartment Building	Baskerville Apartment Building	October 13, 1988 (#88002006)	121-129 S. Hamilton St. 43°04′17″N 89°23′05″W	Madison	Neoclassical-styled flatiron-shaped apartments designed by Robert L. Wright and built 1913-14, early in Madison's apartment-building boom from 1910 to 1930.
12	Bellevue Apartment Building	Bellevue Apartment Building	March 13, 1987 (#87000433)	29 E. Wilson St. 43°04′23″N 89°22′48″W	Madison	Upscale apartments designed by Charles E. Marks and built 1913-14, which promised "relief from the servant problem" via modern conveniences like central vacuuming and dumbwaiters connected to a kitchen in the basement.
13	Belmont Hotel	Belmont Hotel	January 18, 1990 (#89002311)	101 E. Mifflin St. 43°04′35″N 89°23′02″W	Madison	12-story Beaux-Arts-style hotel built in 1924 on the capitol square, reviving concern that skyscrapers would one day hide the capitol, and leading to legislation that still limits other buildings in the area to 90 feet.
14	Bernard–Hoover Boathouse	Bernard–Hoover Boathouse	July 30, 1981 (#81000036)	622 E. Gorham St. 43°04′56″N 89°22′55″W	Madison	Built on Lake Mendota in 1915 by William Bernard, this is the best surviving representative of an era of boat-building, rental, and excursion businesses in the city of four lakes.
15	Biederstaedt Grocery	Biederstaedt Grocery	March 25, 1982 (#82000647)	851–853 Williamson St. 43°04′45″N 89°22′11″W	Madison	Italianate-style corner grocery built in 1874 by Charles Biedersdaedt—the most intact survivor of many such stores that once dotted Madison.
16	Blackhawk Country Club Mound Group (47 DA 131)	Blackhawk Country Club Mound Group (47 DA 131)	August 1, 1979 (#79000068)	3606 Blackhawk Dr; 43°04′47″N 89°27′39″W	Madison	Mounds organized like many around Madison's lakes: three bear effigies on the flat near the water, a goose effigy and some linear mounds heading away from the lake, and conical mounds at the top of the hill.
17	James B. Bowen House	James B. Bowen House	March 1, 1982 (#82000648)	302 S. Mills St. 43°03′50″N 89°24′16″W	Madison	Italianate-style farmhouse built by Seth Van Bergen in 1855, clad in local sandstone. Later home of Bowen, Dane County's first homeopathic physician and mayor of Madison.
18	Harold C. Bradley House	Harold C. Bradley House	February 23, 1972 (#72000047)	106 N. Prospect Ave. 43°04′11″N 89°25′18″W	Madison	Prairie School-styled house designed by Louis Sullivan and George Grant Elmslie, built in 1909 for Harold C. Bradley and his wife Josephine.
19	Judge Arthur B. Braley House	Judge Arthur B. Braley House	November 28, 1980 (#80000116)	422 N. Henry St. 43°04′33″N 89°23′30″W	Madison	Gothic revival house with Aesthetic details on dormers, built around 1875 for Judge and Philinda Braley. Arthur was the long-serving first judge of Dane County's municipal court, a writer, and mentor to Ella Wheeler Wilcox.
20	Brittingham Park Boathouse	Brittingham Park Boathouse	June 30, 1982 (#82000649)	N. Shore Dr. 43°03′55″N 89°23′18″W	Madison	Built in 1910 as the Madison Parks and Pleasure Drive Association created Madison's first public parks, motivated in part by City Beautiful movement. Designed by John Nolen and Ferry & Clas with Arts and Crafts detailing. Oldest surviving public park building in Madison.
21	Charles E. Brown Indian Mounds	Charles E. Brown Indian Mounds	January 5, 1984 (#84003630)	University of Wisconsin–Madison Arboretum; 43°02′48″N 89°25′38″W	Madison	Groups of mounds above springs that flow into Lake Wingra, including linear, conical, one bird effigy and two panther mounds.
22	Burrows Park Effigy Mound and Campsite	Burrows Park Effigy Mound and Campsite	December 31, 1974 (#74000066)	25 Burrows Rd. 43°06′07″N 89°22′02″W	Madison	Straight-winged bird effigy with 128-foot wingspan, built beside Lake Mendota by Late Woodland people between 700 and 1200 A.D.
23	Camp Randall	Camp Randall	June 7, 1971 (#71000036)	Camp Randall Memorial Park, University of Wisconsin campus 43°04′11″N 89°24′34″W	Madison	Civil War training and staging ground where 70,000 of Wisconsin's 91,000 troops mustered. Also briefly a prison for Confederate POWs.
24	Cardinal Hotel	Cardinal Hotel	September 2, 1982 (#82000650)	416 E. Wilson St. 43°04′33″N 89°22′38″W	Madison	Five-story railroad hotel designed by Ferdinand Kronenberg and built c. 1908. The old hotel became a hub of Madison's gay and Cuban communities after Ricardo Gonzalez took ownership in the 1970s.
25	City Market	City Market	November 28, 1978 (#78000085)	101 N. Blount St. 43°04′51″N 89°22′41″W	Madison	City-owned enclosed farmers' market designed in Prairie Style by Robert Wright and built in 1909.
26	Bascom B. Clarke House	Bascom B. Clarke House	November 28, 1980 (#80000117)	1150 Spaight St. 43°04′55″N 89°21′46″W	Madison	1899 Queen Anne-style house with Arts and Crafts elements—an early, traditional design by Claude and Starck. Clarke was a businessman, writer, and publisher of American Thresherman.
27	William Collins House	William Collins House	December 3, 1974 (#74000067)	704 E. Gorham St. 43°04′58″N 89°22′51″W	Madison	A later Prairie style design of Claude and Starck, built ca. 1911. Collins and his brother were partners in a lumber processing and wholesaling business.
28	John R. Commons House	John R. Commons House	March 14, 1985 (#85000572)	1645 Norman Way; 43°04′56″N 89°28′44″W	Madison	1913 home of progressive and influential UW economist John R. Commons - a bungalow designed by Cora Tuttle, the first woman known to practice architecture in Wisconsin.
29	Coolidge Street-Myrtle Street Historic District	Coolidge Street-Myrtle Street Historic District	March 30, 2020 (#100005149)	2301-2826 Myrtle St., 2302-2826 Coolidge St. (Even), 912-1001 Kedzie St., 902-1002 North St. 43°06′34″N 89°20′58″W	Madison	Neighborhood of modest prefab 1.5-story houses developed by John W. Tilton. The first forty were built 1942-1943, working within wartime rationing of materials to house families employed in defense work. The second batch of 119 were built 1946-1948 for returning veterans.
30	Curtis-Kittleson House	Curtis-Kittleson House	April 10, 1980 (#80000118)	1102 Spaight St. 43°04′51″N 89°21′51″W	Madison	Queen Anne style mansion designed by Gordon and Paunack and built in 1901 for William Curtis whose family fortune grew on horse collar pads. Later home of Isaac Kittleson, who served three terms as mayor.
31	Judson C. Cutter House	Judson C. Cutter House	July 12, 1978 (#78000086)	1030 Jenifer St. 43°04′50″N 89°21′58″W	Madison	Built in 1882, this is considered Madison's best Stick/Eastlake style house.
32	Nathaniel W. Dean House	Nathaniel W. Dean House	November 7, 1980 (#80000119)	4718 Monona Dr. 43°04′06″N 89°19′32″W	Madison	Simple brick Italianate-style farmhouse built in 1856 in then-rural Blooming Grove for businessman, realtor and state assemblyman Dean.
33	Christian Dick Block	Christian Dick Block	December 19, 2002 (#02001572)	106 E. Doty St. 43°04′28″N 89°22′50″W	Madison	Cream brick wedge-shaped Richardsonian Romanesque building designed by Conover & Porter and built in 1889 for liquor wholesaler Christian Dick.
34	Dowling Apartment Building	Dowling Apartment Building	October 7, 2002 (#02001127)	445-447 W. Wilson St. 43°04′05″N 89°23′14″W	Madison	1922, early 20th-century apartment house design - home and business of tireless public servant Margaret Dowling.
35	East Dayton Street Historic District	East Dayton Street Historic District	December 27, 1988 (#88000217)	649–53 E. Dayton St. and 114 N. Blount St. 43°04′52″N 89°22′44″W	Madison	Three buildings from the early 1900s that remain from Madison's first Black neighborhood.
36	East Wilson Street Historic District	East Wilson Street Historic District	April 3, 1986 (#86000618)	402–524 E. Wilson and 133 S. Blair Sts. 43°04′35″N 89°22′35″W	Madison	Remnants of a neighborhood of depots, railroad hotels, saloons, and other businesses that grew around Madison's east-side railroad station.
37	Edgewood College Mound Group Archeological District	Edgewood College Mound Group Archeological District	June 7, 1991 (#91000669)	Address Restricted	Madison	1 bird effigy, 2 linear mounds, about 8 conicals, and possibly part of a bear effigy, all paralleling the shore of Lake Wingra.
38	Ernest Eggiman House	Ernest Eggiman House	June 17, 1994 (#94000599)	857 S. Shore Dr. 43°03′25″N 89°23′52″W	Madison	Prefabricated, modular house built in 1936 - an attempt to provide fast, inexpensive housing during the Great Depression. This product was marketed as the Motohome and it's the only one in Wisconsin.
39	Edward C. Elliott House	Edward C. Elliott House	August 11, 1978 (#78000087)	137 N. Prospect Ave. 43°04′15″N 89°25′07″W	Madison	Prairie School home designed by George W. Maher and built ca. 1911.
40	Elmside Park Mounds	Elmside Park Mounds	April 10, 1991 (#91000358)	Elmside Park, corner of Maple and Lakeland; 43°05′25″N 89°20′24″W	Madison	Effigies of a lynx and a bear above Lake Monona. Once this group also had several bird and oval mounds, including a bird with a 563-foot wingspan.
41	Richard T. Ely House	Richard T. Ely House	December 16, 1974 (#74000068)	205 N. Prospect Ave. 43°04′18″N 89°24′58″W	Madison	Home of Ely, the prominent Progressive economist who was attacked for advocating labor unions and whose academic freedom was supported in the "sifting and winnowing" statement. His house was designed by Charles Sumner Frost in Georgian revival style and built in 1896.
42	Farwell's Point Mound Group	Farwell's Point Mound Group	December 27, 1974 (#74000069)	301 Troy Dr. 43°07′50″N 89°24′28″W	Madison	11 conicals and remnants of 2 panther effigies, 1 bird, and 3 linear mounds on high ground above Lake Mendota.
43	Fess Hotel	Fess Hotel	September 21, 1978 (#78003204)	123 E. Doty Street; 43°04′28″N 89°22′48″W	Madison	Hotel/restaurant begun by George Fess in the 1850s and remodeled 1901 by J. O. Gordon and F. W. Paunack. Operated under the Fess family until 1972, and still has unusually intact 19th century architecture.
44	Fire Station No. 4	Fire Station No. 4	March 1, 1984 (#84003637)	1329 W. Dayton St. 43°04′15″N 89°24′31″W	Madison	Station designed by Lew Porter and built 1904, when fire engines were still pulled by horses. Now the oldest intact fire station in Madison.
45	First Church of Christ Scientist	First Church of Christ Scientist	November 24, 1982 (#82001841)	315 Wisconsin Ave. 43°04′39″N 89°23′14″W	Madison	Christian Science church building designed by Frank M. Riley in Classical Revival style and built in 1929.
46	Forest Hill Cemetery Mound Group	Forest Hill Cemetery Mound Group	December 27, 1974 (#74000070)	1 Speedway Rd; 43°03′40″N 89°25′47″W	Madison	Effigy of a goose flying downhill toward Lake Wingra, below two water spirits and a linear mound.
47	Forest Products Laboratory	Forest Products Laboratory	August 25, 1995 (#95001037)	1 Gifford Pinchot Dr. 43°04′28″N 89°25′41″W	Madison	National lab building designed by Holabird & Root in Art Deco and International style and built in 1932. Researchers here have developed pulp paper processes, particle board, and laminated arches, and advanced our understanding of wood chemistry and genetics.
48	Fourth Lake Ridge Historic District	Fourth Lake Ridge Historic District	February 26, 1998 (#98000167)	Roughly bounded by Lake Mendota, N. Brearly, E. Johnson, and N. Franklin Sts. 43°05′00″N 89°22′47″W	Madison	Historic neighborhood north of the capitol on the ridge along Lake Mendota, with homes built as early as 1856, including homes of governors and businessmen, and many designed by Madison architects Claude & Starck.
49	Garver's Supply Company Factory and Office	Garver's Supply Company Factory and Office	August 7, 2017 (#100001445)	3244 Atwood Ave. 43°05′40″N 89°20′04″W	Madison	In 1905, when sugar beets were an important crop around Madison, U.S. Sugar Company built the main building as a beet processing plant. In 1930 James Garver converted the plant to produce livestock feed.
50	Churchill Building	Churchill Building	May 16, 2025 (#100011844)	14–16 N. Carroll St. 43°04′27″N 89°23′10″W	Madison	This nine-story office building, designed by James and Edward Law and built 1913 to 1915, started debate about whether tall commercial buildings should be allowed to hide the state capitol - an example of the tension between commercial developers and the City Beautiful movement.
51	Eugene A. Gilmore House	Eugene A. Gilmore House	March 14, 1973 (#73000077)	120 Ely Pl. 43°04′15″N 89°25′06″W	Madison	A.k.a. the Airplane house. Prairie Style house on a hilltop in west Madison designed by Frank Lloyd Wright and built in 1908. Gilmore was a UW law professor.
52	Grace Episcopal Church	Grace Episcopal Church	January 1, 1976 (#76000055)	6 N. Carroll St. 43°04′26″N 89°23′09″W	Madison	Gothic revival-style, sandstone-clad Episcopal church designed by James Douglas and built 1855-58. Home of the oldest congregation in Madison.
53	Philip H. and Margaret Gray House	Philip H. and Margaret Gray House	March 22, 2021 (#100006286)	6115 North Highlands Ave. 43°04′52″N 89°29′10″W	Madison	Large Wrightian-style house designed by William V. Kaeser and built in 1940 for Philip Gray, a UW professor of English literature.
54	Grimm Book Bindery	Grimm Book Bindery	April 3, 1986 (#86000625)	454 W. Gilman St. 43°04′25″N 89°23′43″W	Madison	Small commercial Georgian revival shop designed by Alvan Small and built in 1926, modeled on Ben Franklin's printing office. Housed the only dedicated book-binding business in Madison for 60 years.
55	Halvorson Mound Group	Halvorson Mound Group	March 25, 1993 (#93000215)	Yahara Heights County Park; 43°09′17″N 89°23′31″W	Madison	A 208-foot water spirit effigy mound and a bear. These remain from a larger group that once included a possible fox effigy.
56	Dr. Charles and Judith Heidelberger House	Dr. Charles and Judith Heidelberger House	June 26, 2017 (#100001255)	118 Vaughn Ct. 43°03′54″N 89°26′41″W	Madison	Modest-sized Contemporary-style house designed by Herbert Fritz Jr. and built in 1951 for Dr. Heidelberger, a cancer researcher at the UW.
57	Henry Mall Historic District	Henry Mall Historic District	January 22, 1992 (#91001986)	420, 425, 440, 445, 460 and 465 Henry Mall and 1450 Linden Dr., University of Wisconsin campus 43°04′30″N 89°24′40″W	Madison	Landscaped mall and the academic ag buildings of the UW that face it, built starting in 1903 after the Bascom Hill mall was filled.
58	Louis Hirsig House	Louis Hirsig House	December 2, 1974 (#74000072)	1010 Sherman Ave. 43°05′14″N 89°22′33″W	Madison	Modest Prairie Style house designed by Alvan Small and built about 1913 for Hirsig, a partner in a hardware store on the capitol square.
59	Holy Name Seminary	Holy Name Seminary	July 14, 2015 (#15000424)	702 S. High Point Rd. 43°03′04″N 89°31′21″W	Madison	Catholic high school seminary on the west side, designed by Krueger, Kraft and Associates in Neo-Colonial Revival style and built in 1963. Now houses offices and apartments.
60	Horticulture and Agricultural Physics and Soil Science Building	Horticulture and Agricultural Physics and Soil Science Building	March 14, 1985 (#85000574)	1525 Observatory Dr., University of Wisconsin campus 43°04′35″N 89°24′38″W	Madison	The main section was designed by J.T.W. Jennings in Richardsonian Romanesque style and built in 1894 and 1896. In early years a windmill was mounted on the west tower for Dr. Franklin Hiram King's experiments. Now called King Hall.
61	Hotel Loraine	Hotel Loraine	October 10, 2002 (#02001125)	119-123 W. Washington Ave. 43°04′23″N 89°23′08″W	Madison	10-story high-rise hotel designed by Herbert Tullgren and built in 1925 for Walter Schroeder. Madison's leading hotel for 45 years.
62	Frank W. Hoyt Park	Frank W. Hoyt Park	August 17, 2018 (#100002815)	3902 Regent St., 90 & 91 Owen Pkwy. 43°04′08″N 89°26′30″W	Madison	City park on the west side. The Sunset Point section was developed by UW French professor Edward Owen in 1892, a gift to the city. The stone structures were added in the 1930s as CWA and WPA work-relief projects.
63	Hyer's Hotel	Hyer's Hotel	September 22, 1983 (#83003370)	854 Jenifer St. 43°04′44″N 89°22′09″W	Madison	Built in 1854 as a hotel for ordinary travelers, with Greek Revival and Italianate stylings. Room and board was 50 cents a day, and the innkeeper could pull your bad tooth if needed.
64	Italian Workmen's Club	Italian Workmen's Club	July 24, 2024 (#100010597)	914 Regent Street; 43°04′04″N 89°24′07″W	Madison	Social hall built in 1922 by the Italian Workmen's Club, a mutual benefit organization formed in 1912. The hall is one of the few survivors of the old Italian Greenbush neighborhood. The brick building was built by the original members & designed by Law, Law and Potter.
65	Jackman Building	Jackman Building	March 27, 1980 (#80000121)	111 S. Hamilton St. 43°04′22″N 89°23′03″W	Madison	Wedge-shaped office building designed by Claude and Starck and built 1913–14 for Jackman's law firm, with Classical Revival styling outside and Prairie Style inside.
66	Herbert and Katherine Jacobs First House	Herbert and Katherine Jacobs First House	July 24, 1974 (#74000073)	441 Toepfer Ave. 43°03′31″N 89°26′29″W	Madison	Low-cost Modernist house with glass walls facing the private backyard, designed by Frank Lloyd Wright and built in 1937. Considered by many the first and purest Usonian house.
67	Herbert and Katherine Jacobs Second House	Herbert and Katherine Jacobs Second House	December 31, 1974 (#74000074)	3995 Shawn Trail; 43°04′26″N 89°32′05″W	Madison	Wright's first hemicycle home, and a solar hemicycle, oriented to catch the sun's heat and shelter from cold winter winds. Built 1946-48, it was an early foray into passive solar.
68	Jenifer-Spaight Historic District	Jenifer-Spaight Historic District	October 13, 2004 (#04001153)	Jenifer and Spaight Sts. roughly bounded by S. Brearly St. and Williamson St. 43°04′43″N 89°22′06″W	Madison	Historic neighborhood between Williamson St and Lake Monona, with structures as old as 1854, but most built from the 1890s to 1920s.
69	Adolph H. Kayser House	Adolph H. Kayser House	November 28, 1980 (#80000122)	802 E. Gorham St. 43°05′03″N 89°22′45″W	Madison	1902 house designed by Claude and Starck, mixing Prairie School with classical detailing. Kayser was a German immigrant who ran a lumber company and later became mayor of Madison.
70	King Street Arcade	King Street Arcade	March 30, 2020 (#100005150)	107–113 King St., 115–117 South Pinckney St. 43°04′28″N 89°22′52″W	Madison	Early covered shopping mall with 24 small shops and offices, designed by Henry Charles Huart in 20th Century Commercial style and built in 1927 for developer J.N. Hobbins.
71	Klueter and Company Wholesale Grocery Warehouse	Klueter and Company Wholesale Grocery Warehouse	October 19, 2018 (#100003034)	901 E Washington Ave. 43°04′56″N 89°22′22″W	Madison	5 story grocery warehouse designed by Alvin Small in Prairie Style and built in 1916 for the Klueter business. Later owned by Simon Bros, Mautz Paint Co, and now Hotel Indigo.
72	Lake Farms Archeological District	Lake Farms Archeological District	December 22, 1978 (#78000088)	Lake Farm County Park; 43°01′35″N 89°19′53″W	Madison	Seasonal site of Early Woodland people, who left behind remains of fish, mammals, waterfowl and nuts, along with pottery fragments.
73	Lake View Sanatorium	Lake View Sanatorium	April 15, 1993 (#93000258)	1204 Northport Dr. 43°08′18″N 89°22′29″W	Madison	Former county tuberculosis sanatorium built 1929-30, designed by Law, Law & Potter and E. A. Stubenrauch in Art Deco style.
74	Lamb Building	Lamb Building	August 2, 1984 (#84003645)	114 State St. 43°04′30″N 89°23′14″W	Madison	Three-story commercial building designed by Claude and Starck in Queen Anne style and built in 1905.
75	Robert M. Lamp House	Robert M. Lamp House	January 3, 1978 (#78000089)	22 N. Butler St. 43°04′37″N 89°22′57″W	Madison	Built in 1903, this is the oldest building by Frank Lloyd Wright in Madison, designed for his childhood friend Robie Lamp. Style is Chicago School transitioning to Prairie School.
76	Langdon Street Historic District	Langdon Street Historic District	June 26, 1986 (#86001394)	Roughly bounded by Lake Mendota, Wisconsin Ave., Langdon, and N. Lake Sts. 43°04′38″N 89°23′35″W	Madison	Historic neighborhood east of the UW campus, where some of Madison's most prominent residents lived in the 1800s, but were squeezed out by fraternity and sorority houses starting around 1890.
77	August Cornelius Larson House	August Cornelius Larson House	May 19, 1994 (#94000451)	1006 Grant St. 43°03′49″N 89°24′53″W	Madison	Textbook Prairie Style house built in 1911, probably designed by Claude and Starck.
78	Lathrop Hall	Lathrop Hall	July 11, 1985 (#85001503)	1050 University Ave., University of Wisconsin campus 43°04′25″N 89°24′11″W	Madison	Women's gym and union designed in neo-Renaissance style by Paul Cret with input from Warren Laird and Arthur Peabody and built in 1910. Housed the first dance major in the U.S. starting in 1926.
79	William T. Leitch House	William T. Leitch House	July 18, 1975 (#75000061)	752 E. Gorham St. 43°05′02″N 89°22′45″W	Madison	Well-preserved home of two Wisconsin governors, built 1857–58. The design is attributed to August Kutzbock and considered "the best example of mid-19th century Gothic Revival style" in Madison.
80	William Ellery Leonard House	William Ellery Leonard House	February 25, 1993 (#93000071)	2015 Adams St. 43°03′40″N 89°25′01″W	Madison	Home of Leonard, the brilliant poet-professor who at times couldn't travel far from his house. Craftsman style, designed by Eugene Marks, built 1915.
81	Lincoln School	Lincoln School	August 28, 1980 (#80000123)	728 E. Gorham St. 43°05′00″N 89°22′49″W	Madison	Prairie Style public school designed by Claude and Starck and built in 1915. Operated until 1963. Now apartments.
82	Longfellow School	Longfellow School	March 7, 1996 (#96000239)	1010 Chandler St. 43°03′53″N 89°24′09″W	Madison	2-story public grade school that served the Greenbush neighborhood. Designed by Law, Law, and Potter in Tudor Revival style and built in 1917, with additions in 1924 and 1938.
83	George A. Lougee House	George A. Lougee House	June 7, 1978 (#78000090)	620 S. Ingersoll St. 43°04′48″N 89°21′49″W	Madison	2-story stucco-clad Prairie Style home designed by Claude and Starck and built in 1907 for George Lougee, who ran the Madison Park Hotel.
84	Luther Memorial Church	Luther Memorial Church	March 26, 2018 (#100002284)	1021 University Ave. 43°04′23″N 89°24′12″W	Madison	Neogothic style Lutheran church, designed by Claude & Starck with a soaring ceiling to suggest a European cathedral, and built 1921-23.
85	Machinery Row	Machinery Row	April 12, 1982 (#82000654)	601–627 Williamson St. 43°04′34″N 89°22′29″W	Madison	A long brick business block designed by Conover and Porter in industrial Richardsonian Romanesque style and built 1898–1914. Many early tenants were distributors of farm machinery who used the adjacent railroad tracks to distribute their threshers and reapers around this part of the Midwest.
86	Alan and Janet Mackenzie House	Alan and Janet Mackenzie House	October 24, 2016 (#100012052)	2525 Marshall Pkwy. 43°02′48″N 89°25′04″W	Madison	One-story Modernist house designed by Madison architects Bowen and Kanazawa and built in 1966.
87	Madison Brass Works	Madison Brass Works	October 24, 2016 (#16000738)	206-214 Waubesa St. 43°05′45″N 89°20′37″W	Madison	Small foundry started in 1918, which survived until 1994 despite discriminatory rail rates for shipping from Madison.
88	Madison Candy Company	Madison Candy Company	March 28, 1997 (#97000294)	744 Williamson St. 43°04′41″N 89°22′20″W	Madison	Candy factory designed by John Nader and built in 1903.
89	Madison Gas and Electric Company Powerhouse	Madison Gas and Electric Company Powerhouse	December 6, 2002 (#02001126)	100 S. Blount St. 43°04′45″N 89°22′28″W	Madison	Earliest part of the complex was built in 1902, an example of Neoclassical industrial design by Claude and Starck.
90	Madison Masonic Temple	Madison Masonic Temple	September 13, 1990 (#90001456)	301 Wisconsin Ave. 43°04′38″N 89°23′13″W	Madison	Masonic temple built 1925, designed by James R. & Edward J. Law in Neoclassical style.
91	Madison Saddlery Company	Madison Saddlery Company	November 3, 2022 (#100008333)	313–317 East Wilson St. 43°04′29″N 89°22′39″W	Madison	4-story brick industrial loft designed by Alvan Small and built in 1907, which housed the factory, warehouse, and sales room for Carl Hoebel's saddlery company.
92	Madison Vocational School	Madison Vocational School	March 21, 2019 (#100003545)	211 N. Carroll St. 43°04′33″N 89°23′15″W	Madison	4-story Collegiate Gothic-style school with its initial section designed by Ferdinand Kronenberg and built in 1921. 1949 addition was designed by Law, Law, Potter & Nystrom. Now a campus site of the Madison Area Technical College. A boundary decrease was approved October 10, 2023.
93	Madison Waterworks	Madison Waterworks	August 18, 1980 (#80000125)	E. Gorham St. between N. Franklin and N. Hancock St. 43°04′49″N 89°23′00″W	Madison	Early 20th-century utilitarian design with Prairie School and Arts and Crafts detailing, designed by Balch & Lippert and built in 1921.
94	Mansion Hill Historic District	Mansion Hill Historic District	June 4, 1997 (#97000552)	Roughly bounded by E. Dayton, E. Johnson, E. Gorham, N. Butler, Langdon, and W. Gilman Sts., and Lake Mendota; 43°04′40″N 89°23′18″W	Madison	Residential neighborhood northwest of the capitol, where some of Madison's leading families built grand, stylish houses as early as the 1850s. Since the 1880s most of those old families have left the neighborhood, to be replaced by students.
95	Marquette Bungalows Historic District	Marquette Bungalows Historic District	April 14, 1997 (#97000329)	Bounded by S. Thornton Ave., Rutledge, S. Dickinson, and Spaight Sts. 43°05′06″N 89°21′25″W	Madison	Two blocks of bungalow-style homes built by Karrels Development from 1924 to 1930.
96	Timothy C. and Katherine McCarthy House	Timothy C. and Katherine McCarthy House	July 17, 2002 (#02000813)	848 Jenifer St. 43°04′44″N 89°22′10″W	Madison	2.5-story elaborate Queen Anne style house designed by Lew Porter and built in 1897 for McCarthy, whose construction firm built a lot of the current state capitol, along with other important buildings.
97	McCormick-International Harvester Company Branch House	McCormick-International Harvester Company Branch House	April 27, 2010 (#10000231)	301 South Blount St. 43°04′39″N 89°22′25″W	Madison	3-story sales-warehouse built in 1898 by McCormick to house distribution of their farm machinery, then expanded in 1910 after McCormick merged into International Harvester. Utilitarian-commercial/industrial design.
98	Mendota State Hospital Mound Group	Mendota State Hospital Mound Group	December 27, 1974 (#74000076)	301 Troy Dr. 43°07′48″N 89°23′50″W	Madison	3 eagle effigies (one with almost 600-foot wingspan), 2 panthers (one with an unusual curved tail), 2 bears, 1 unusual four-legged deer, and several conical mounds, next to a village site from 1000 CE.
99	Merrill Springs Mound Group II Archeological District	Merrill Springs Mound Group II Archeological District	June 7, 1991 (#91000670)	5030-5046 Lake Mendota Dr. 43°04′52″N 89°27′58″W	Madison	2 linears, 2 conicals, and remnants of 2 effigies
100	Miller House	Miller House	November 8, 1979 (#79000339)	647 E. Dayton St. 43°04′51″N 89°22′45″W	Madison	Home of Black community leaders William and Anna Mae Miller. Built 1853, moved from corner of Pinckney & Johnson Streets in 1904. Oldest surviving Black-owned building in Madison.
101	Mills Woods Mound	Mills Woods Mound	June 7, 1991 (#91000667)	Hudson Park, corner of Hudson and Lakeland; 43°05′24″N 89°20′43″W	Madison	Effigy may be a lizard, turtle, or panther.
102	Simeon Mills House	Simeon Mills House	August 13, 1987 (#87001386)	2709 Sommers Ave. 43°05′34″N 89°20′39″W	Madison	East-side Italianate-style country house built in 1863 for Mills, a businessman and public servant.
103	Nakoma Historic District	Nakoma Historic District	February 26, 1998 (#98000168)	Roughly bounded by Odana Rd., Manitou Way, Mohawk Dr., and Whenona Dr. 43°02′36″N 89°26′38″W	Madison	Largely intact collection of Period Revival homes in a subdivision that was developed from 1914 to the 1940s, with Colonial Revival the most common style.
104	North Hall, University of Wisconsin	North Hall, University of Wisconsin	October 15, 1966 (#66000021)	1050 Bascom Mall; 43°04′32″N 89°24′11″W	Madison	The first building of the UW, designed by John F. Rague in Greek Revival style and built in 1851. For the first four years it more or less was the whole UW, housing dorm rooms, lecture rooms, study rooms, and a chapel.
105	Observatory Hill Mound Group	Observatory Hill Mound Group	March 31, 2004 (#04000255)	Observatory Hill, University of Wisconsin–Madison; 43°04′34″N 89°24′36″W	Madison	A bird effigy and a two-tailed water spirit (or a turtle?) on the isthmus above Lake Mendota.
106	Old Executive Mansion	Old Executive Mansion	April 11, 1973 (#73000078)	130 E. Gilman St. 43°04′47″N 89°23′13″W	Madison	Italianate style mansion built 1854-56 for insurance executive Julius White. Later home to lumber baron Joseph G. Thorp and his son-in-law Ole Bull. Bought in 1883 by Governor Rusk and used as official residence of Wisconsin governors until 1950.
107	Old Spring Tavern	Old Spring Tavern	January 21, 1974 (#74000077)	3706 Nakoma Rd. 43°03′00″N 89°26′15″W	Madison	Built in 1854 as a stopping place on the Madison-Monroe stagecoach road, by Charles Morgan in Greek revival style.
108	Old Synagogue	Old Synagogue	December 29, 1970 (#70000030)	E. Gorham St. at N. Butler St. 43°04′48″N 89°23′05″W	Madison	Madison's first synagogue, designed by August Kutzbock in Rundbogenstil (German version of Romanesque Revival) and built in 1863.
109	Old U.S. Forest Products Laboratory	Old U.S. Forest Products Laboratory	September 12, 1985 (#85002332)	1509 University Ave., University of Wisconsin campus 43°04′23″N 89°24′40″W	Madison	First institution in the world created specifically to research wood and wood products, designed by Albert Gallistel under Arthur Peabody in Georgian revival style and built in 1909.
110	Orpheum Theater	Orpheum Theater	January 23, 2008 (#07001460)	216 State St. 43°04′30″N 89°23′20″W	Madison	Designed by Rapp and Rapp and built 1925-27, the Orpheum remains Madison's best representative of the movie palace era.
111	Orton Park	Orton Park	December 18, 1978 (#78000091)	1100 Spaight St. 43°04′51″N 89°21′47″W	Madison	Madison's first public park, developed in 1887, with residents of the east-side Sixth Ward leading the way.
112	Orton Park Historic District	Orton Park Historic District	October 31, 1988 (#88000221)	Roughly bounded by Spaight St., S. Few St., Lake Monona, and S. Ingersoll St. 43°04′50″N 89°21′46″W	Madison	Cluster of 56 stylish historic homes that developed around Orton Park, most built from the 1880s to 1950s.
113	John George Ott House	John George Ott House	September 23, 1982 (#82000656)	754 Jenifer St. 43°04′40″N 89°22′16″W	Madison	Italianate-style brick house built in 1873 for Swiss immigrant storekeeper and businessman Ott.
114	Pflaum-McWilliams Mound Group	Pflaum-McWilliams Mound Group	June 7, 1991 (#91000666)	Address Restricted	Madison	An animal effigy and six linear mounds - some very long - lined up on a ridge.
115	Carrie Pierce House	Carrie Pierce House	October 18, 1972 (#72000048)	424 N. Pinckney St. 43°04′43″N 89°23′15″W	Madison	Elegant sandstone-clad mansion designed in Romanesque Revival style by Samuel Donnell and built in 1857 for Alexander McDonnell, with styling similar to the third state capitol, which both worked on.
116	Plough Inn	Plough Inn	May 29, 1980 (#80000127)	3402 Monroe St. 43°03′12″N 89°26′05″W	Madison	Stonecutter immigrant Frederick Paunack built the first stone section in 1853 and operated it as a stagecoach inn. The brick front was added in 1858 by English glass-blower John Whare, who sold plows there and entertained Union soldiers during the Civil War.
117	Quisling Towers Apartments	Quisling Towers Apartments	January 9, 1984 (#84003648)	1 E. Gilman St. 43°04′42″N 89°23′18″W	Madison	Intact Streamline Moderne-style apartment building designed by Louis Monberg and built in 1937 for Dr. Abraham Quisling.
118	St. Patrick's Roman Catholic Church	St. Patrick's Roman Catholic Church	September 16, 1982 (#82000657)	404 E. Main St. 43°04′37″N 89°22′45″W	Madison	Historic Catholic church designed by John Nader in an eclectic style influenced by Rundbogenstil and built 1888-89 to serve a largely Irish parish.
119	Sherman Avenue Historic District	Sherman Avenue Historic District	March 22, 1988 (#88000216)	Sherman Ave. roughly between Marston Ave. and N. Brearly St. 43°05′24″N 89°22′27″W	Madison	Historic neighborhood along Lake Mendota on the east end of the isthmus, including homes in a variety of styles built from the mid-1890s to 1920s.
120	Simeon Mills Historic District	Simeon Mills Historic District	June 25, 1987 (#87001063)	102-118 King and 115-123 E. Main Sts. 43°04′29″N 89°22′52″W	Madison	Seven commercial buildings built from 1845 to 1887 in Italianate and Romanesque Revival styles. Simeon Mills built a log store and saloon in this area in 1837 - the first store in Madison. That log store is gone, but the structure at 121-123 E. Main still probably contains framing from 1847 - the oldest in Madison.
121	Hiram Smith Hall and Annex	Hiram Smith Hall and Annex	March 14, 1985 (#85000573)	1545 Observatory Dr., University of Wisconsin campus 43°04′33″N 89°24′42″W	Madison	Queen Anne-style academic building designed by George B. Ferry and built 1891 to house the first permanent dairy school in the western hemisphere. In 1909 an annex designed by Arthur Peabody was added.
122	Spring Harbor Mound Group	Spring Harbor Mound Group	June 7, 1991 (#91000668)	North of Spring Harbor Middle School; 43°04′54″N 89°28′21″W	Madison	A bear effigy and a linear mound above Lake Mendota.
123	State Historical Society of Wisconsin	State Historical Society of Wisconsin	February 23, 1972 (#72000049)	816 State St. 43°04′31″N 89°23′59″W	Madison	Library and office building designed by Ferry & Clas and built from 1896-1900 - initially a shared library of the Historical Society and the UW. Considered one of the finest Neoclassical Revival designs in the state.
124	State Office Building	State Office Building	January 28, 1982 (#82000658)	1 W. Wilson St. 43°04′19″N 89°22′54″W	Madison	High-rise office complex designed by Arthur Peabody in Art Deco style and built in stages from 1931-1959, with support from the Public Works Administration.
125	Halle Steensland House	Halle Steensland House	November 30, 1982 (#82001843)	315 N. Carroll St. 43°04′37″N 89°23′18″W	Madison	Fine brick Queen Anne style house designed by Gordon and Paunack and built in 1901 for Steensland, a Norwegian immigrant who rose from store clerk to Madison civic leader and vice-consul to Sweden.
126	Steinle Turret Machine Company	Steinle Turret Machine Company	December 13, 2007 (#07001272)	149 Waubesa St. 43°05′48″N 89°20′37″W	Madison	Factory built on the east side in 1903 to produce farm equipment. In 1909 it converted to producing turret lathes under a new owner, and in 1940 steel fabrication. Now the Goodman Community Center's Ironworks building.
127	Breese Stevens Municipal Athletic Field	Breese Stevens Municipal Athletic Field	August 3, 2015 (#15000502)	917 E. Mifflin St. 43°05′00″N 89°22′24″W	Madison	Multi-purpose stadium designed by Madison architectural firm Claude and Starck in Mediterranean Revival style, constructed from 1925 to 1926.
128	Stock Pavilion	Stock Pavilion	July 11, 1985 (#85001504)	1675 Linden Dr., University of Wisconsin campus 43°04′29″N 89°24′54″W	Madison	Exhibit hall designed by Warren Laird, Paul Cret, and Arthur Peabody in vernacular style with Tudor revival elements and built in 1909.
129	Joseph J. Stoner House	Joseph J. Stoner House	January 17, 1980 (#80000129)	321 S. Hamilton St. 43°04′11″N 89°23′04″W	Madison	Detached Italianate-style townhouse, clad in sandstone in a distinctive masonry pattern, built around 1855. From 1865 to the 1880s it was the home of Joseph Stoner, a lead figure in that day's birds-eye view map business.
130	John J. Suhr House	John J. Suhr House	June 17, 1982 (#82000660)	121 Langdon St. 43°04′38″N 89°23′29″W	Madison	One of Madison's few remaining Second Empire-style houses, designed by John Nader and built in 1886 for Suhr, an early banker. Replaced porch.
131	Sunset Hills Historic District	Sunset Hills Historic District	June 15, 2015 (#15000356)	Bounded by Owen Pkwy., Regent & Larkin Sts., Hillcrest Dr. 43°03′54″N 89°26′41″W	Madison	Historic neighborhood on the near west side, containing 93 houses developed between 1955 and 1978, all designed by professional architects in modern styles.
132	Sylvan Avenue - Ridge Road Historic District	Sylvan Avenue - Ridge Road Historic District	April 8, 2020 (#100005173)	Roughly bounded by South Franklin St., Ridge Rd., Glenway St., and Sylvan Ave. 43°04′00″N 89°26′15″W	Madison	Another historic neighborhood on the near west side, containing 28 houses built from 1907 to 1966 - mostly from the '30s on. Includes the 1907 Dutch Colonial Revival-style Alexander house, the 1926 Tudor Revival Knudsen house, the 1940 International Style Haskin house, the 1940 Ranch style Bunn house, and the 1941 Contemporary style Seborg house.
133	Tenney Building	Tenney Building	October 26, 2017 (#100001775)	110 E. Main St. 43°04′30″N 89°22′54″W	Madison	10-story Art Deco style office building designed by Law, Law and Potter and built 1929-30.
134	Tenney Park – Yahara River Parkway	Tenney Park – Yahara River Parkway	September 17, 1999 (#99001173)	1220 E. Johnson St.; 501 S. Thornton Ave. 43°05′23″N 89°21′48″W	Madison	Two parks along the Yahara River, both designed by Ossian Cole Simonds, the father of Prairie School landscape architecture. They mark the point where the Madison Park and Pleasure Drive Association began developing parks for the general public - not just for the well-to-do.
135	Thompson's Block	Thompson's Block	June 7, 1984 (#84003654)	119 E. Main St. 43°04′30″N 89°22′52″W	Madison	Three-story cream brick Italianate-styled commercial building built to house a grocery store in 1868. Possibly designed by August Kutzbock.
136	Thorstrand	Thorstrand	August 11, 1980 (#80000131)	1-2 Thorstrand Rd. 43°05′28″N 89°28′56″W	Madison	Historic estate of Magnus Swenson, the prominent Norwegian immigrant inventor, including two Mediterranean Revival-style mansions designed by Law and Law and built in 1922.
137	United States Post Office and Federal Courthouse	United States Post Office and Federal Courthouse	November 27, 2002 (#02001443)	215 Martin Luther King Junior Blvd. 43°04′24″N 89°22′53″W	Madison	Neo-Classical-style structure designed under James A. Wetmore and built 1927-29. Also known as the Madison Municipal Building.
138	University Heights Historic District	University Heights Historic District	December 17, 1982 (#82001844)	Roughly bounded by Regent, Allen, Lathrop Sts., and Kendall Ave. (both sides); 43°04′12″N 89°25′08″W	Madison	Historic neighborhood on the west side, in a subdivision developed from 1894 to 1965, noted for good examples of architecture and important people who lived in the district.
139	University Hill Farms Historic District	University Hill Farms Historic District	August 11, 2015 (#15000402)	Roughly bounded by N. & S. Midvale Blvd., Sheboygan Ave., N. & S. Whitney Way, N. Rock & Mineral Point Rds. 43°03′59″N 89°27′42″W	Madison	Another historic neighborhood on the west side, in a subdivision that was developed by the UW as a planned community on the UW's old experimental farm.
140	University of Wisconsin Arboretum	University of Wisconsin Arboretum	January 28, 2019 (#16000518)	1207 Seminole Hwy. 43°02′29″N 89°25′51″W	Madison	1280 acres of park and wildlands around Lake Wingra, developed starting in 1927 as an outdoor lab for studying plants and the restoration of native species on farmed land. The New Deal Civilian Conservation Corps did some of the development from 1935 to 1943. Designated a National Historic Landmark in 2021.
141	University of Wisconsin Armory and Gymnasium	University of Wisconsin Armory and Gymnasium	November 4, 1993 (#93001618)	716 Langdon St., University of Wisconsin campus 43°04′35″N 89°23′54″W	Madison	Fortress-like structure designed by Conover and Porter in Richardsonian Romanesque style, and built starting in 1892 to host athletic events, local militia, and local assemblies. In 1904 it hosted the Wisconsin Republican party's state convention, in which La Follette's Progressive Republicans wrested control from the pro-business Stalwarts. Aka the Old Red Gym
142	University of Wisconsin Dairy Barn	University of Wisconsin Dairy Barn	May 31, 2002 (#02000600)	1915 Linden Dr., University of Wisconsin campus 43°04′28″N 89°25′06″W	Madison	Teaching and research facility designed by John T.W. Jennings in a barn style of Normandy with an experimental round tower silo. Built starting in 1897. Site of Babcock's single-grain experiment.
143	University of Wisconsin Field House	University of Wisconsin Field House	July 1, 1998 (#98000829)	1450 Monroe St., University of Wisconsin campus 43°04′07″N 89°24′45″W	Madison	Covered auditorium just south of Camp Randall, designed in Italian Renaissance style by William F. Stevens, John Knudsen, and Arthur Peabody and built in 1930. Clad in Madison sandstone.
144	University of Wisconsin Memorial Union	University of Wisconsin Memorial Union	May 19, 2015 (#15000255)	800 Langdon St., University of Wisconsin campus 43°04′35″N 89°24′00″W	Madison	Renaissance Revival-style complex on Lake Mendota built to serve as the UW's living room, offering meals and extracurricular recreation opportunities to bring students and faculty together from all corners of campus with activities like the Rathskeller, the Terrace, dances, shows and Hoofer's. Designed by Arthur Peabody, Leon Pecheret and others and built starting in 1928.
145	University of Wisconsin Science Hall	University of Wisconsin Science Hall	November 4, 1993 (#93001616)	550 N. Park St., University of Wisconsin campus 43°04′33″N 89°24′04″W	Madison	1887, Allan Conover and Henry C. Koch, Richardsonian Romanesque
146	University Presbyterian Church and Student Center	University Presbyterian Church and Student Center	October 16, 2002 (#02001185)	731 State St. 43°04′29″N 89°23′55″W	Madison	
147	Vilas Circle Bear Effigy Mound and the Curtis Mounds	Vilas Circle Bear Effigy Mound and the Curtis Mounds	December 30, 1974 (#74000078)	Bear Mound Park and adjacent property 43°03′47″N 89°24′41″W	Madison	Late Woodland bear effigy in a small city park/traffic circle. One linear mound in adjacent private property remains from the larger Curtis Mound group.
148	Vilas Park Mound Group	Vilas Park Mound Group	April 10, 1991 (#91000357)	Vilas Park; 43°03′34″N 89°24′29″W	Madison	A bird effigy, 1 linear and 6 conical mounds in a Late Woodland group near Lake Wingra.
149	Wakeley-Giles Commercial Building	Wakeley-Giles Commercial Building	February 23, 1988 (#88000081)	117–119 E. Mifflin St. 43°04′36″N 89°23′00″W	Madison	
150	Washburn Observatory and Observatory Director's Residence	Washburn Observatory and Observatory Director's Residence	March 14, 1985 (#85000575)	1401 and 1225 Observatory Dr., University of Wisconsin campus 43°04′34″N 89°24′31″W	Madison	1878-1881, David R. Jones, Italianate style
151	West Lawn Heights Historic District	West Lawn Heights Historic District	March 5, 1998 (#98000223)	Roughly bounded by Virginia Ter., Regent St., S. Spooner Ave., and Illinois Central Railroad; 43°03′56″N 89°25′26″W	Madison	
152	West Madison Depot, Chicago, Milwaukee, and St. Paul Railway	West Madison Depot, Chicago, Milwaukee, and St. Paul Railway	May 9, 1985 (#85000990)	640 W. Washington Ave. 43°04′05″N 89°23′40″W	Madison	1903
153	Wiedenbeck-Dobelin Warehouse	Wiedenbeck-Dobelin Warehouse	December 23, 1986 (#86003473)	619 W. Mifflin St. 43°04′07″N 89°23′40″W	Madison	1907, Claude and Starck, utilitarian-industrial design
154	Willow Drive Mounds and Habitation Site Complex	Willow Drive Mounds and Habitation Site Complex	September 2, 2025 (#16000430)	N. end of Willow Dr. 43°04′42″N 89°25′07″W	Madison	Archeological complex on southern shore of Lake Mendota, with occupations dating from Middle Archaic to the Late Woodland phase (1000CE?). The obvious features are four earthen burial mounds: a bent-winged goose, a conical mound, a bifurcated linear mound, and a possible water spirit mound.
155	Wingra Park Historic District	Wingra Park Historic District	October 14, 1999 (#99001257)	Roughly bounded by Monroe St., Garfield St., Chandler St., S. Randall Ave., Drake St., Vilas Ave., and Edgewood Ave. 43°03′45″N 89°24′55″W	Madison	
156	Wisconsin Memorial Hospital Historic District	Wisconsin Memorial Hospital Historic District	November 3, 1988 (#88002183)	816 Troy Dr. 43°07′52″N 89°24′18″W	Madison	
157	Wisconsin State Capitol	Wisconsin State Capitol	October 15, 1970 (#70000031)	Capitol Sq. 43°04′29″N 89°23′03″W	Madison	1917, Beaux-Arts style
158	Wisconsin Wagon Company Factory	Wisconsin Wagon Company Factory	November 15, 2002 (#02001343)	602 Railroad St. 43°04′38″N 89°22′36″W	Madison	ca. 1906, early 20th-century utilitarian-industrial design

== See also ==
- List of National Historic Landmarks in Wisconsin
- National Register of Historic Places listings in Dane County, Wisconsin
- National Register of Historic Places listings in Wisconsin
- Wisconsin Historical Society
