= Elmside Park Mounds =

- U.S. National Register of Historic Places
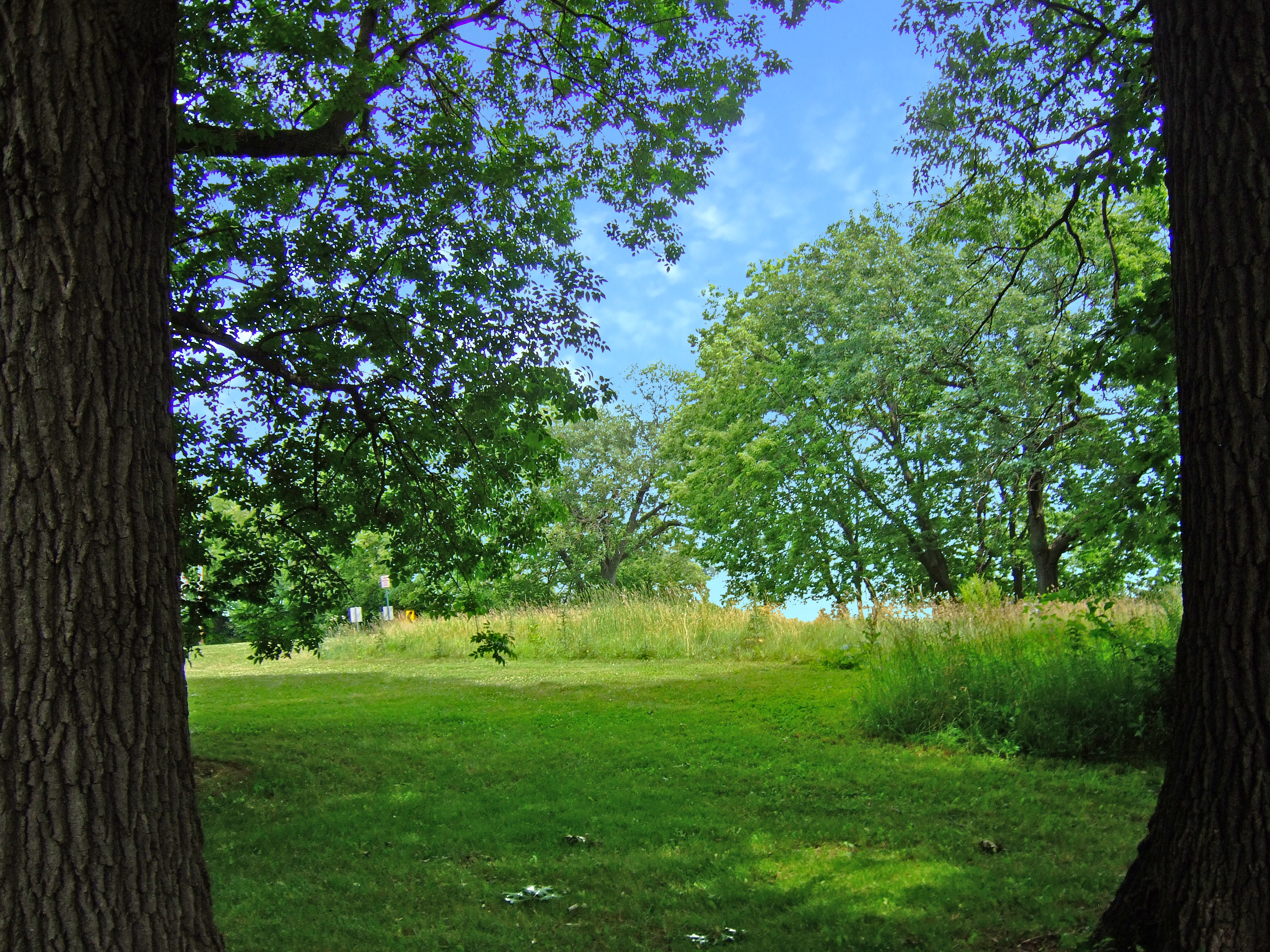

- Location within Wisconsin Location within the United States
- Interactive map showing the location of Elmside Park mounds
- Location: Elmside Park, corner of Maple and Lakeland, Madison, Wisconsin
- Coordinates: 43°05′25″N 89°20′24″W
- Area: less than one acre
- MPS: Late Woodland Stage in Archeological Region 8 MPS
- NRHP reference No.: 91000358
- Added to NRHP: April 10, 1991

The Elmside Park Mounds are a group of Native American mounds in Elmside Park in Madison, Wisconsin. The group includes two animal-shaped effigy mounds; while their shapes are inconclusive, they have been described as a lynx and a bear. The mounds were once part of the Oakridge Mound Group, which included three other mounds, but the others were destroyed by home construction. Mound Builder peoples built the mounds in the Late Woodland period, likely between 800 and 1100 A.D., to serve as burial and ceremonial sites. The mounds may be the only remnant of a Late Woodland community on the northeast shore of Lake Monona and are archaeologically significant in the study of Late Woodland civilizations.

The mounds were added to the National Register of Historic Places on April 10, 1991.
