= Judson C. Cutter House =

Historic house in Wisconsin, United States

- U.S. National Register of Historic Places
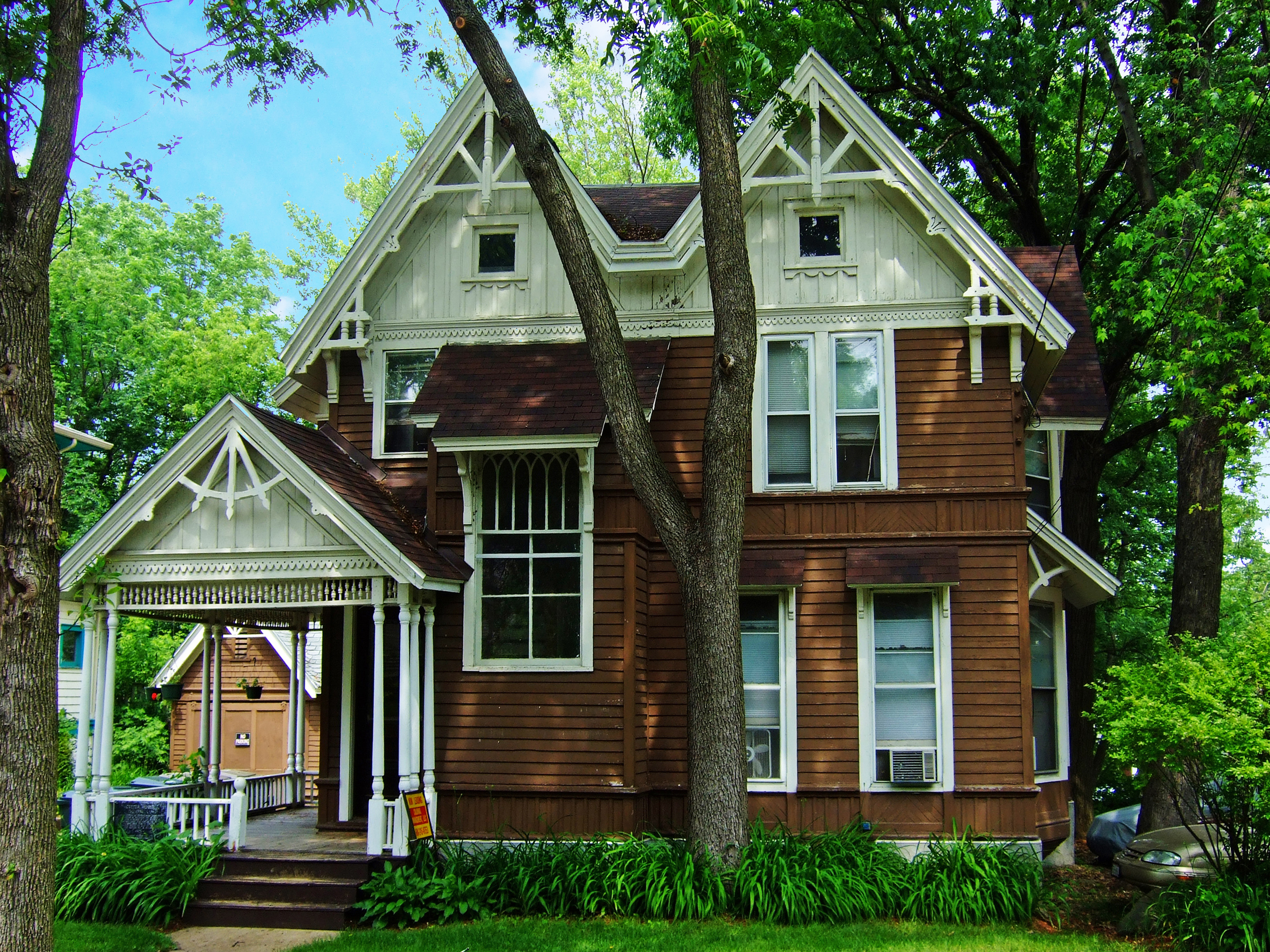

- Location within Wisconsin Location within the United States
- Location: 1030 Jenifer St. Madison, Wisconsin
- Coordinates: 43°40′51″N 89°21′59″W
- Built: 1882
- Architectural style: Stick
- NRHP reference No.: 78000086
- Added to NRHP: July 12, 1978

The Judson C. Cutter House is a Stick style house built in 1882 in Madison, Wisconsin. In 1978 it was added to the National Register of Historic Places, then recognized as the best remaining example of Stick style in the city.

== History ==
Stick-style architecture was popular in various parts of the U.S. from 1860 to 1890. The style is transitional between the Gothic Revival architecture that was declining in the U.S. by the 1870s and the Queen Anne style that was the rage from 1880 to 1910. Stick style was popular in the northeast from the 1860s to 1870s, then faded there. It peaked in California in the 1880s. Stick houses were built in the Midwest, but never many. In Madison, only a few examples remain.

This Stick-style house stands 2 1/2-stories tall, with fairly steep roof planes and tall windows. This emphasis on the vertical comes from Gothic Revival, as do the lancet-topped panes in the window in the stairwell. The board and batten in the gable ends also harks back to Carpenter Gothic. The bargeboards on the gable ends could fit on either a Gothic or Queen Anne house. The wooden crosspieces in the gable peaks, the wooden brackets supporting the eaves, and the raised boards separating areas of clapboard are hallmarks of Stick style - wooden decoration somewhat related to useful structure beneath. The main block of the house also includes some shed-roofed window hoods and a two-story bay. At the southwest corner is a more Eastlake-styled porch, supported by turned posts and decorated with spindle work.

The house was commissioned by Judson C. Cutter, who listed himself as "capitalist" in the Madison city directories. He probably never lived there, but instead leased it to various tenants until 1890, when one of the tenants bought it.

In 1976, the house was designated a landmark by the Madison Landmarks Commission. In 1978 it was added to the NRHP as a surprisingly intact example of Stick style. The nomination notes that the Judson house "displays more design similarities to the Stick Style as it appeared in seaside cottages in the East and in pattern books than any other house in Madison."
