= Thompson's Block =

- U.S. National Register of Historic Places
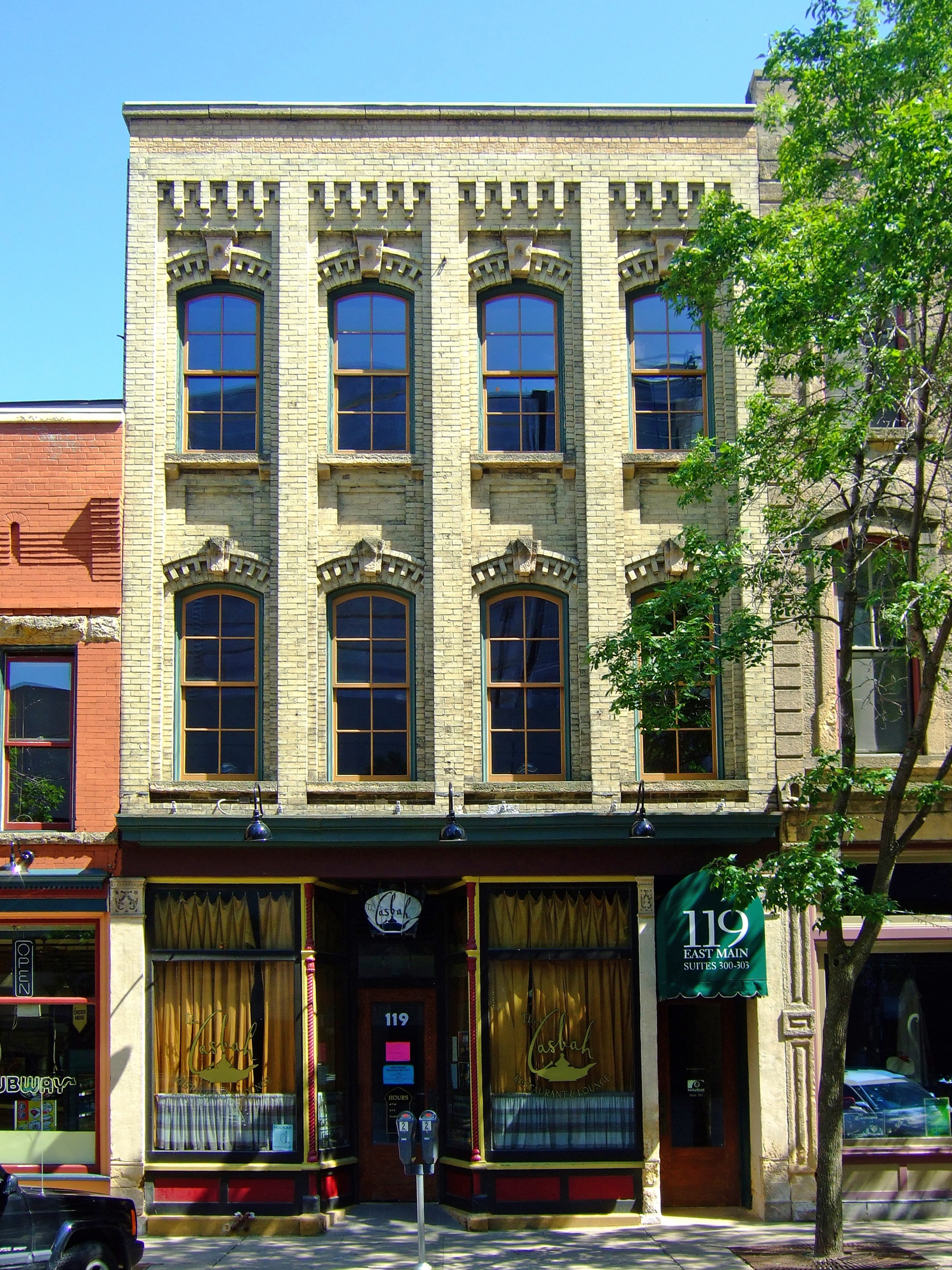
- Thompson's Block

- Location within Wisconsin
- Location: 119 E. Main St., Madison, Wisconsin
- Coordinates: 43°04′30″N 89°22′51″W
- Area: less than one acre
- Built: 1868
- Architectural style: Italianate
- NRHP reference No.: 84003654
- Added to NRHP: June 7, 1984

Thompson's Block is a 3-story cream brick commercial building a block west of the capitol in Madison, Wisconsin. It was built in 1868 as a grocery store for businessman Ole Thompson. The building was listed on the National Register of Historic Places in 1984 and on the State Register of Historic Places in 1989 - considered significant because its exterior is a rare survivor of mid-19th century commercial architecture in Madison.

Ole Thompson, one of Madison's early Norwegian entrepreneurs, had run a hotel on Butler Street for some years. In 1867 he branched into retail, buying the lot at 119 E. Main and replacing an old wooden building with the brick building now called Thompson's Block. His new building stood three stories tall - the front of the first floor a cast-iron storefront flanked by sandstone piers. The cast-iron storefront was a rather new thing at the time, giving a better view of goods inside and admitting more light than earlier storefronts of load-bearing brick. The front of the upper floors was cream brick with Italianate-style pilasters, window hoods, and dentils formed from the brick. A limestone keystone topped each segmental arched window hood, and each window rose from a sandstone sill. The original front was topped with a bracketed cornice with a centered pediment, but that was simplified during maintenance in 1947.

Once built, Ole and his partner John R. Regan ran a grocery store in the building, also selling "drugs, medicines, wines, liquors, paints, oils, chemicals, etc." In 1868 when the business started, Thompson's was one of twelve stores in the business district on Main and King Streets which sold groceries or dry goods. In 1871 Thompson and Regan's partnership dissolved and Ole Thompson died. Competitors Clark and Mills ran the business until 1874, when it was bought by Louis Nelson. He and his son Moses sold groceries there until 1929. They were known for their good fish market and the store was a neighborhood meeting place for many years.

In the early 1930s the building was converted to a tavern at street level and offices above. From 1969 to 1982 it housed the Dangle Louge, a burlesque bar.

The building had been remodeled in 1947, replacing upper-story windows, widening the doorway, and redoing the storefront windows with a Tudor design. In 1983 the storefront was restored to resemble the original, even repairing the damaged sandstone piers. As of 2025, the building houses a pub called the Rigby.
