= Observatory Hill Mound Group =

- U.S. National Register of Historic Places
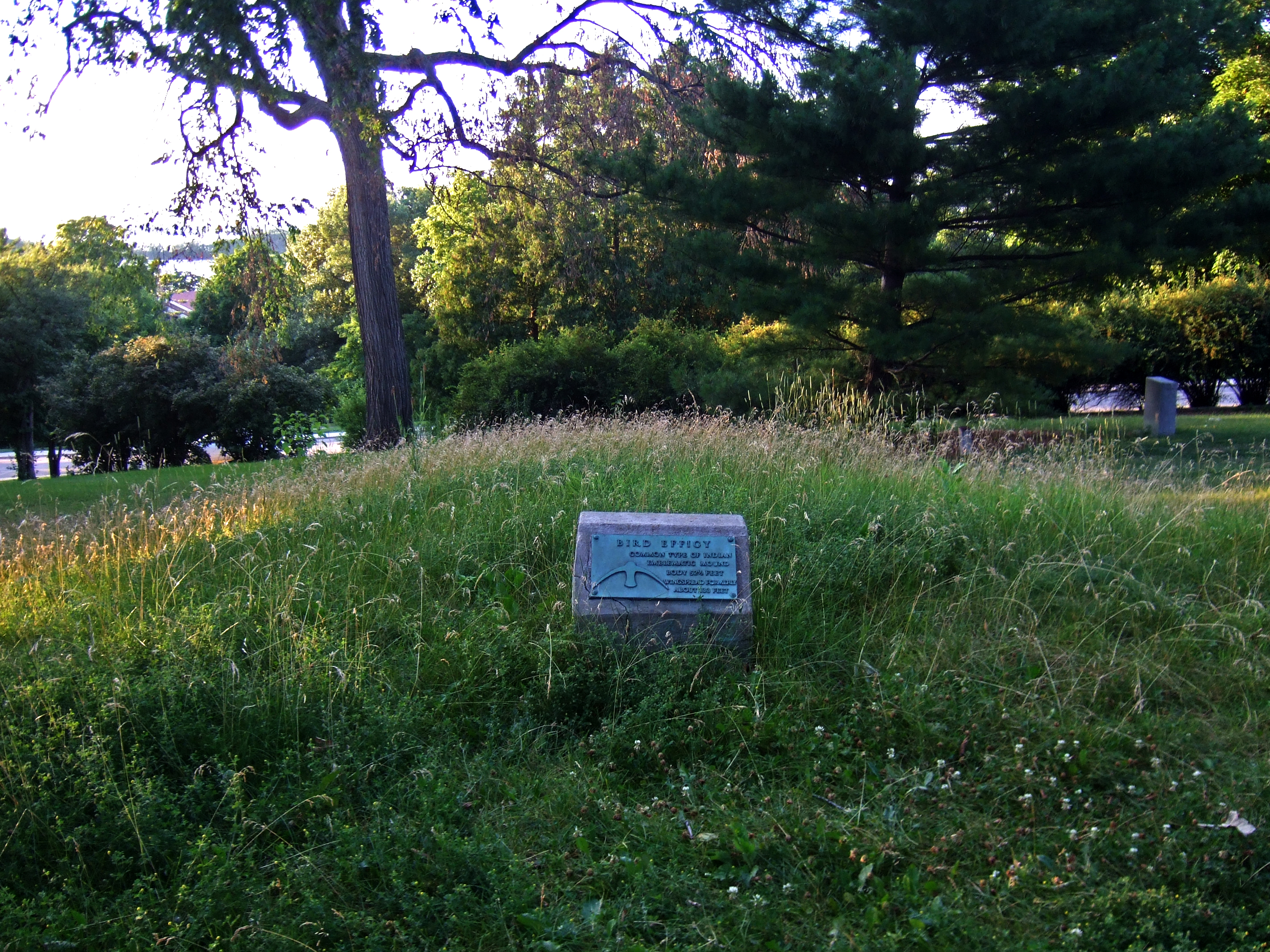

- Location within Wisconsin
- Location: Observatory Hill, Madison, Wisconsin
- Coordinates: 43°04′34″N 89°24′36″W
- Area: less than one acre
- NRHP reference No.: 04000255
- Added to NRHP: March 31, 2004

The Observatory Hill Mound Group is a group of Native American mounds on Observatory Hill on the campus of the University of Wisconsin–Madison. The group consists of two effigy mounds, one in the shape of a bird and the other in the shape of a double-tailed turtle or water spirit. A panther effigy and a linear mound were once part of the group as well, but these were destroyed in the twentieth century. The mounds were built between 650 and 1200 A.D. by the Late Woodland people, who were responsible for building effigy mounds throughout Wisconsin.

The site was listed on the National Register of Historic Places on March 31, 2004.
