= Wingra Park Historic District =

Historic district in Wisconsin, United States

- U.S. National Register of Historic Places
- U.S. Historic district
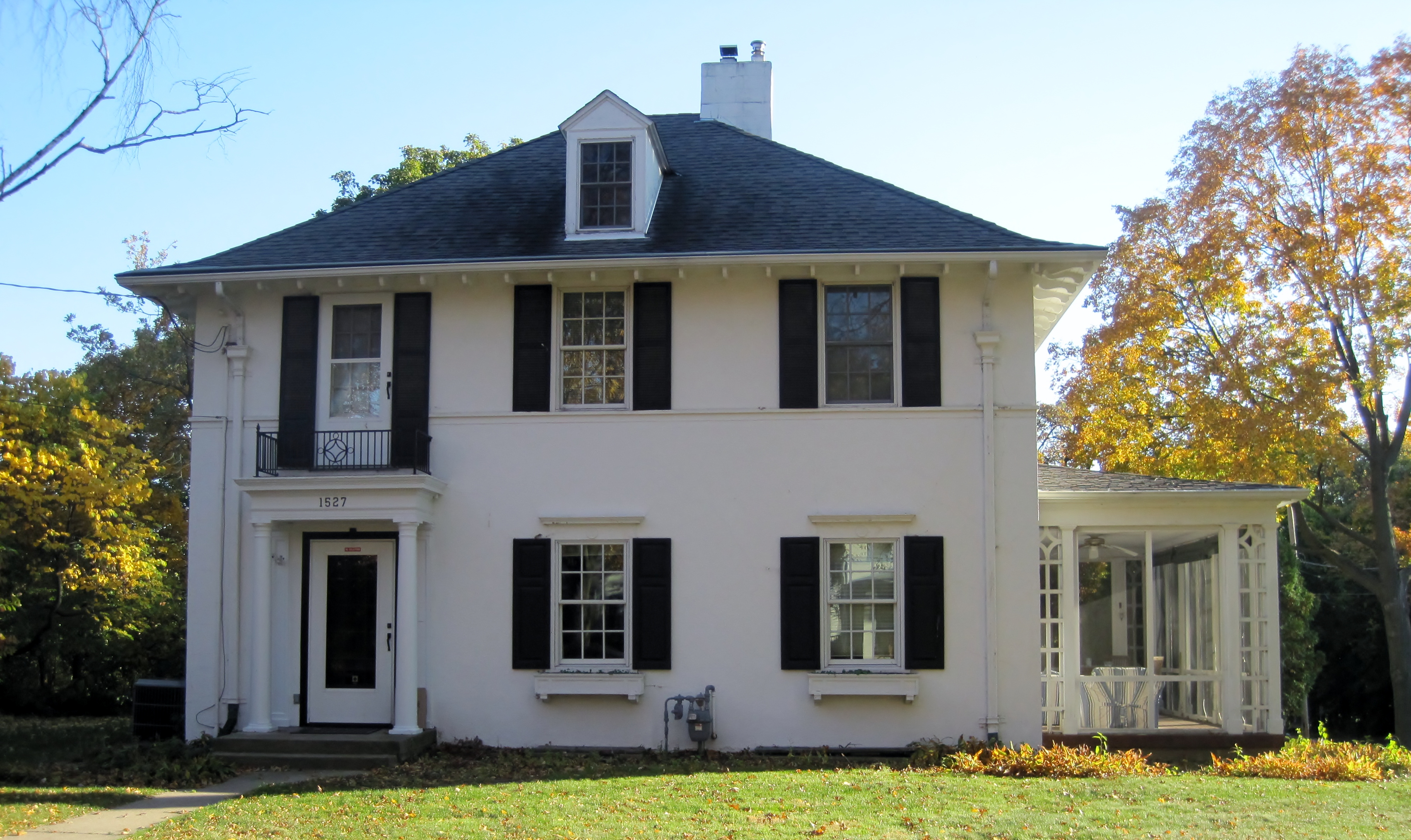
- House in Wingra Park Historic District

- Location within Wisconsin Location within the United States
- Location: Roughly bounded by Monroe St., Garfield St., Chandler St., S. Randall Ave., Drake St., Vilas Ave., and Edgewood Ave., Madison, Wisconsin
- Coordinates: 43°03′45″N 89°24′55″W
- NRHP reference No.: 99001257
- Added to NRHP: October 14, 1999

The Wingra Park Historic District is a residential historic district on the near west side of Madison, Wisconsin, United States. The district includes 320 buildings, 297 of which are considered contributing to its historic significance, and Vilas Circle Park. It was added to the National Register of Historic Places on October 14, 1999.

== History ==
The land that the district now sits on was purchased by William T. Fish in 1889. Fish divided the land into lots and sold them for new homes, though slow sales prompted him to sell the remaining land in 1893. The new owners formed the Wingra Park Advancement Association to spur development and land sales; the group's efforts brought a streetcar line and electric street lights to the new neighborhood, and Madison annexed Wingra Park in 1903.

The oldest surviving house in the district was built in 1891, and most houses in the district were built between then and 1940. Many examples of popular architectural styles from the early twentieth century can be found in the district; the American Craftsman style is the most prevalent, while the Colonial Revival, Tudor Revival, bungalow, and Prairie School styles are also well-represented. American Foursquare and Queen Anne houses can also be found in the district; the latter is particularly common in pre-1900 houses.
