= Bernard–Hoover Boathouse =

- U.S. National Register of Historic Places
- The Bernard–Hoover Boathouse from the west

- Location within Wisconsin Location within the United States
- Location: 622 E. Gorham Street, Madison, Wisconsin
- Coordinates: 43°4′56″N 89°22′55.5″W
- Area: 0.2 acres (0.081 ha)
- Built: 1915
- NRHP reference No.: 81000036
- Added to NRHP: July 30, 1981

The Bernard–Hoover Boathouse was built in 1915 on the shore of Lake Mendota in Madison, Wisconsin, United States. Today it sits in James Madison Park as the oldest standing boathouse on Lake Mendota, a remnant of an era when commercial boating thrived in the "city of the four lakes." In 1981 the boathouse was listed on the National Register of Historic Places.

== History ==
Charles Bernard was born in 1824 in the Grand Duchy of Baden in Germany and immigrated to the U.S. with his parents around 1832. He served in the U.S. Marine Band, as a soldier in the Mexican–American War, as a ship's carpenter, and worked as a tailor in Lancaster County, Pennsylvania, arriving in Madison in 1853. Here he worked as a tailor and fisherman. In 1855 he bought the property where his boathouse now stands to use as a fishing station. The 1875 city directory lists "Charles Bernard Boat Delivery, First Class Pleasure and Fishing Boats and Fishing Material to Let, Landing Near Woolen Mill on Fourth Lake."

Bernard's fishing business grew into "the first major commercial boating concern in Madison." From about 1886 to the 1940s, before it was easy to hop in the car and go, boating excursions were a popular pastime in Madison, and various enterprises took customers on recreational outings around the lakes. Most of the excursions ran on the more peaceful Lake Monona, taking tourists to Schuetzen Park, the Tonyawatha Springs Hotel, the Monona Lake Assembly chatauqua at what is now Olin Park, and Esther Beach Dane Pavilion. Bernard's business took adventurers out on bigger, wilder Lake Mendota. For his excursions Bernard built steamboats Anne in 1890, Columbia in 1893, and Wisconsin in 1905. Charles died in 1907, and his son William took over the business. Around that time the Bernards bought some land at Woodward's Grove across the lake and created Bernard's Pleasure Park, their own destination with picnic spots, a refreshment stand, swings, and a dancing pavilion.

As hinted by Bernard's directory listing above, the boat businesses were diverse. Along with excursions, Madison had boat-builders and boat liveries, which rented boats.

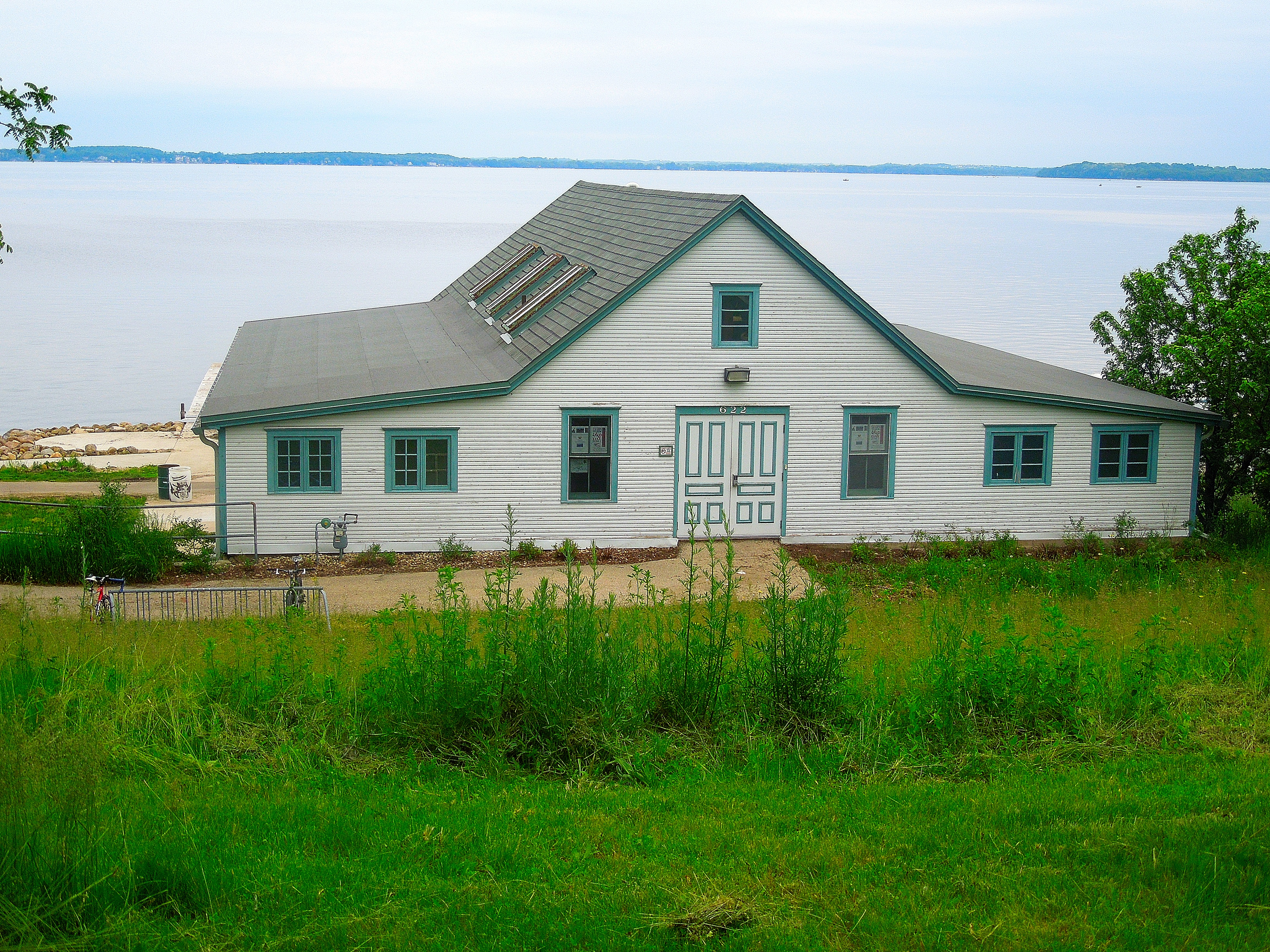
The boathouse and Lake Mendota

In 1915, after a previous boathouse on the site burned, the Bernards built the boathouse that stands today. It is a wooden structure on a concrete foundation, with the main central block standing two stories tall. Six skylights in the central roof admit light. A shed-roofed lean-to is attached to each side, expanding the storage space. Facing the lake are four garage-door-type openings for moving boats in and out of the bays.

The commercial boating business in Madison declined with the rise of the automobile. Around 1940 the Bernards sold their boathouse, boats and docs to Berg's Sporting Company. In 1943 they were sold in turn to Harry Hoover, who ran the business until 1968. At that point the city bought it all and incorporated it into James Madison Park. Since 1975, the Hoover Boathouse has been home to the Mendota Rowing Club.
