= Spring Harbor Mound Group =

- U.S. National Register of Historic Places
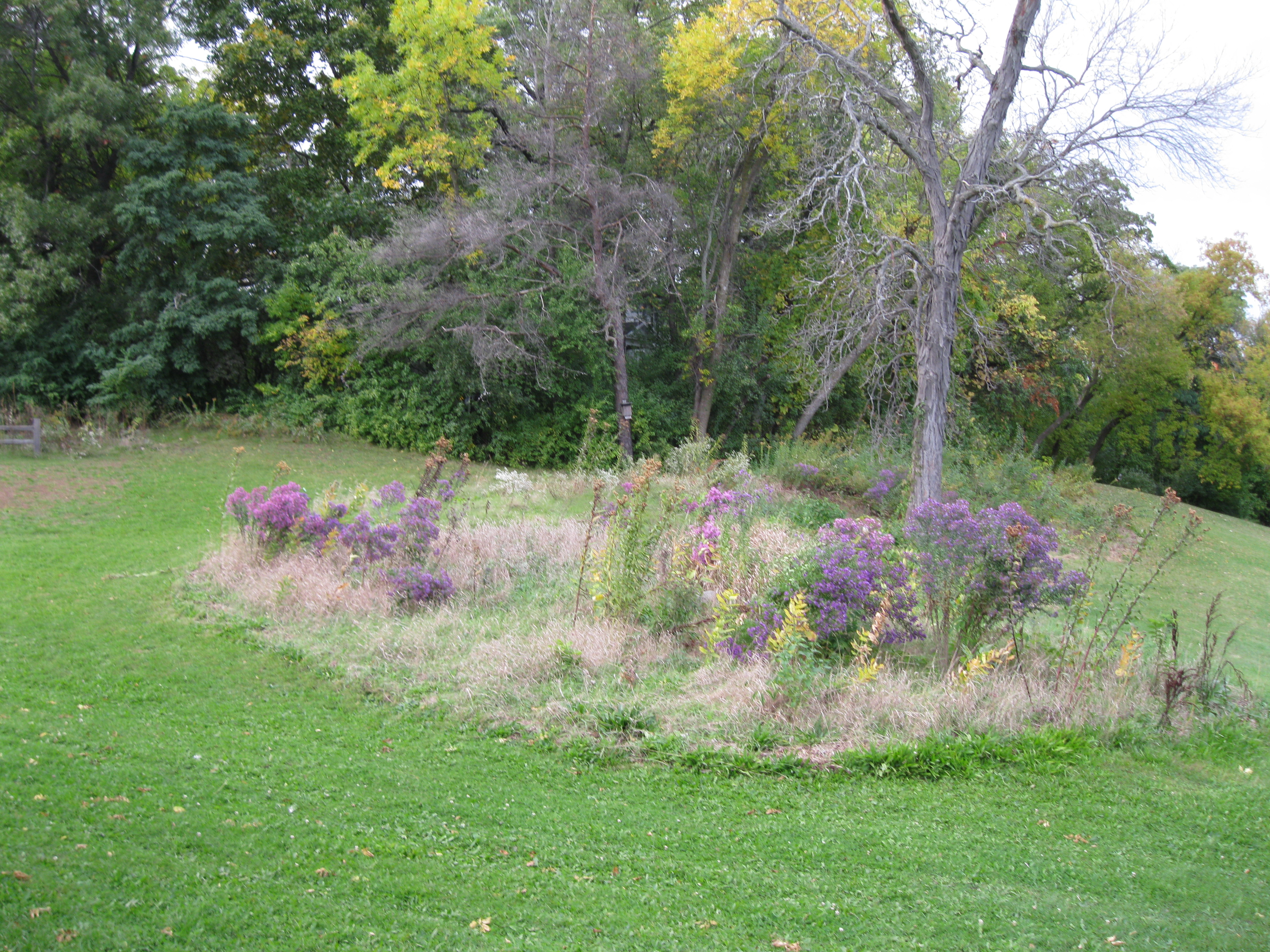

- Location within Wisconsin
- Location: North of Spring Harbor Middle School, Madison, Wisconsin
- Coordinates: 43°04′54″N 89°28′21″W
- Area: less than one acre
- MPS: Late Woodland Stage in Archeological Region 8 MPS
- NRHP reference No.: 91000668
- Added to NRHP: June 7, 1991

The Spring Harbor Mound Group consists of two Native American mounds located north of Spring Harbor Middle School in Madison, Wisconsin. The site includes a bear-shaped effigy mound on the grounds of the school and a linear mound on private property. The mounds were constructed between roughly 800 and 1100 A.D. by Late Woodland people. White settlers first discovered the mounds in the late 19th century, and surveys done between 1905 and 1910 reported that the group had four to six mounds. By 1989, when the Wisconsin Historical Society surveyed the group, all but two of the mounds had been destroyed by development.

The site was added to the National Register of Historic Places on June 7, 1991.
