= Vilas Circle Bear Effigy Mound and the Curtis Mounds =

- U.S. National Register of Historic Places
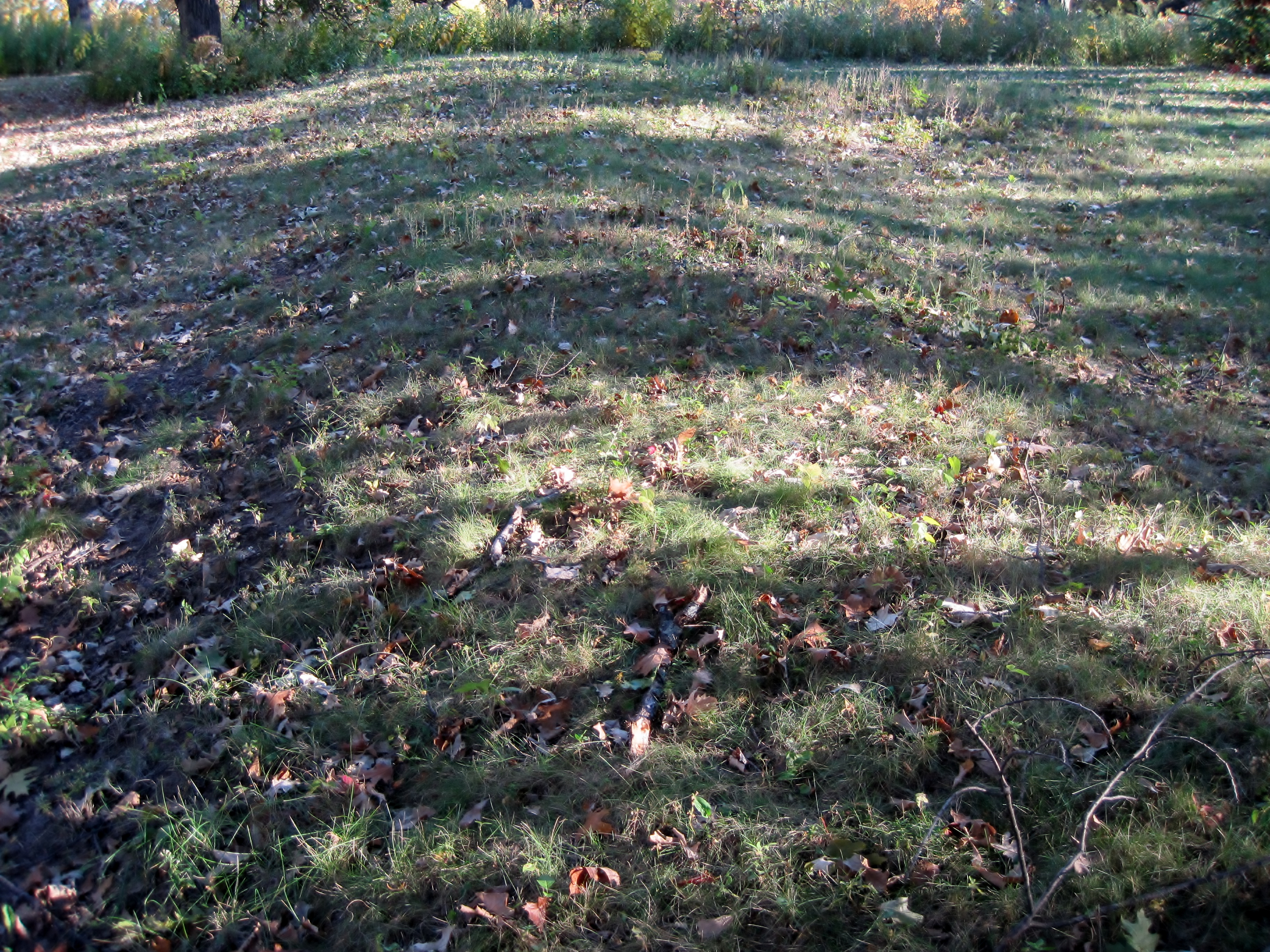

- Location within Wisconsin Location within the United States
- Location: Bear Mound Park and adjacent property, Madison, Wisconsin
- Coordinates: 43°03′47″N 89°24′41″W
- Area: 1 acre (0.40 ha)
- Built: c. 500-1200 A.D.
- NRHP reference No.: 74000078
- Added to NRHP: December 30, 1974

Vilas Circle Bear Effigy Mound and the Curtis Mounds are a group of Native American mounds in Madison, Wisconsin. The Bear Effigy Mound is in the public Bear Mound Park, while the Curtis Mounds are on a neighboring residential property. As its name indicates, the Bear Effigy Mound is in the shape of a bear, and is intact except for a section of the bear's leg. The Curtis Mounds were seven linear mounds running down the hill and several conical mounds. Now only parts of one or two linear mounds remain, on private property.

Mound Builder civilizations built the mounds between 500 and 1200 A.D. to serve as burial sites. Bear-shaped mounds represented earth and humanity in the Mound Builder tradition; other animal-shaped mounds, such as birds and lizards, were used to represent other elements.

The mounds were added to the National Register of Historic Places on December 30, 1974.
