= Pflaum-McWilliams Mound Group =

- U.S. National Register of Historic Places
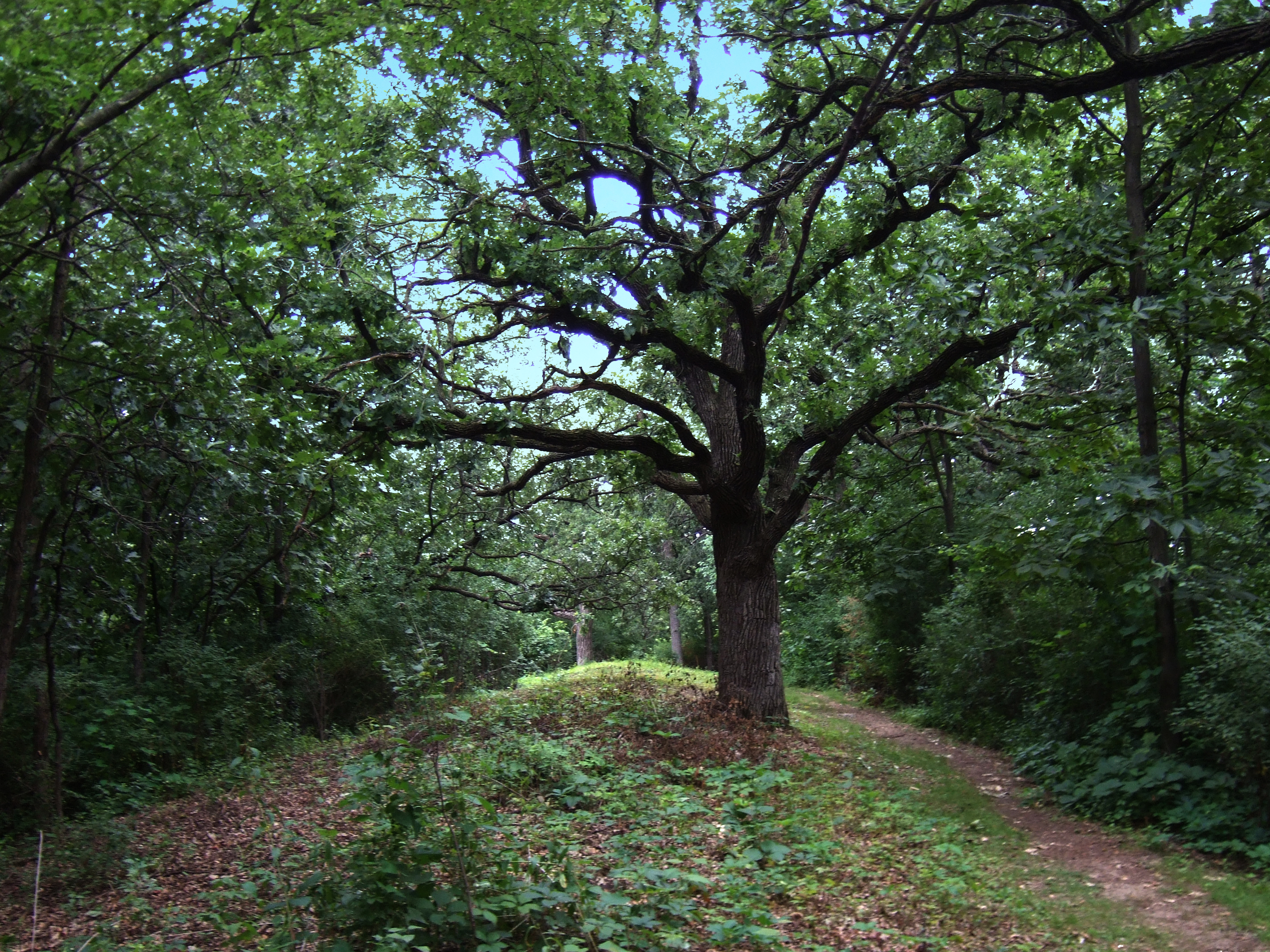
- Location: Edna Taylor Conservancy, Madison, Wisconsin
- Area: 5 acres (2.0 ha)
- MPS: Late Woodland Stage in Archeological Region 8 MPS
- NRHP reference No.: 91000666
- Added to NRHP: June 7, 1991

The Pflaum-McWilliams Mound Group, also known as the Edna Taylor Conservancy Mound Group, is a group of Native American mounds in Madison, Wisconsin. Located in the Edna Taylor Conservancy in southeast Madison, the group includes an animal effigy mound and six linear mounds. The linear mounds are unusually long compared to other surviving mounds in the Madison area; the longest is 484 feet (148 m), and several are over 200 feet (61 m) in length. While a number of the linear mounds have been damaged, the group is generally well-preserved. The mounds were built during the Late Woodland period, most likely between 800 and 1100 A.D., and were thought to have been used for ceremonial purposes.

The mounds were added to the National Register of Historic Places on June 7, 1991.
