= Burrows Park Effigy Mound and Campsite =

- U.S. National Register of Historic Places
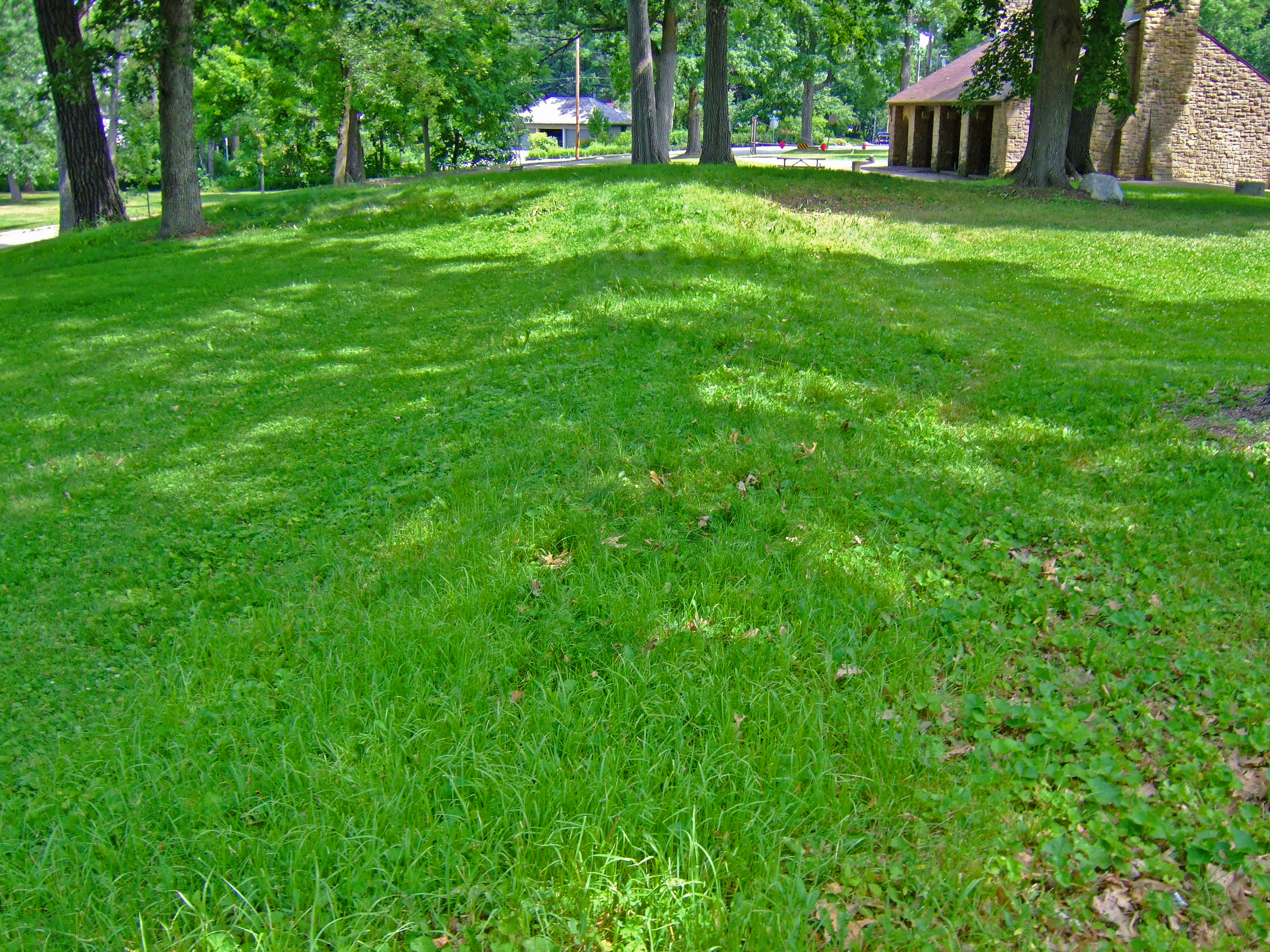

- Location within Wisconsin Location within the United States
- Location: Burrows Park, Madison, Wisconsin
- Coordinates: 43°06′07″N 89°22′02″W
- Area: 4.5 acres (1.8 ha)
- NRHP reference No.: 74000066
- Added to NRHP: December 31, 1974

Burrows Park Effigy Mound and Campsite is an archaeological site in Burrows Park in Madison, Wisconsin. The site includes a bird-shaped effigy mound with an 128-foot (39 m) wingspan; it once included a fox-shaped mound as well, though it has been destroyed. The mound was built by Mound Builders during the Late Woodland period, likely between 700 and 1200 A.D. The Mound Builders used effigy mounds as burial sites, and bird-shaped mounds represented sky spirits in their religion; effigies of other animals were used to represent different elements. A 1934 restoration project repaired vandalism to the mound and cleaned up its surroundings.
