= Plough Inn (Madison, Wisconsin) =

Historic house in Wisconsin, United States

- U.S. National Register of Historic Places
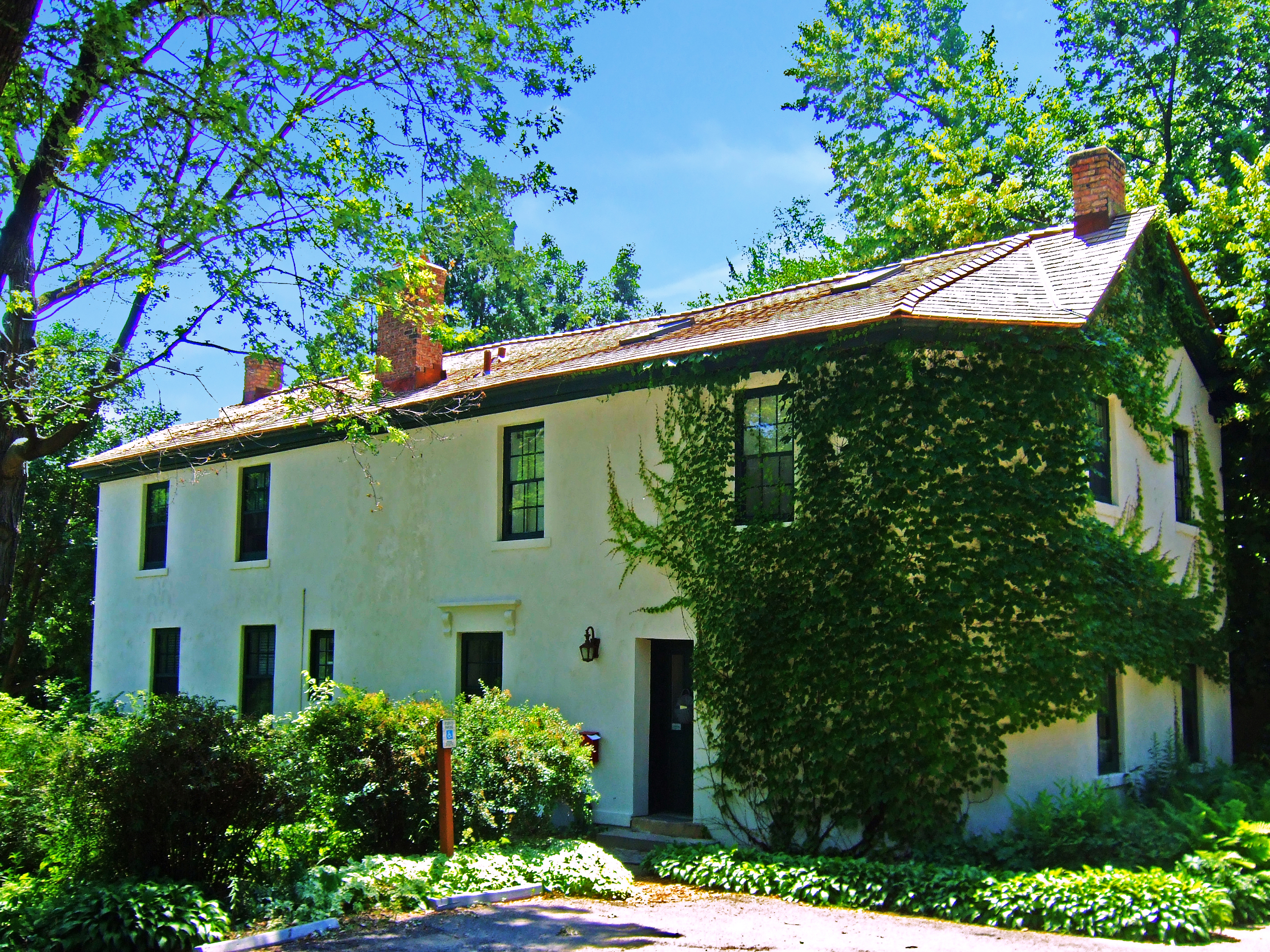
- Plough Inn
- Location: 3402 Monroe St., Madison, Wisconsin
- Coordinates: 43°03′12″N 89°26′05″W
- Area: 0.2 acres (0.081 ha)
- Built: 1853/1858
- Architectural style: Greek Revival
- NRHP reference No.: 80000127
- Added to NRHP: May 29, 1980

The Plough Inn is a stone and brick structure built in 1853 southwest of what was then Madison, Wisconsin. The building served as an inn for travelers on the road heading southwest for the lead-mining region. In 1980 the inn was listed on the National Register of Historic Places.

== History ==
Frederick and Amelia Paunack were immigrants from Saxony in what is now Germany. Frederick arrived in America in 1849, lived in Baltimore for two years, then moved to Madison in 1851. He was a stonecutter, worked on university buildings, and bought a business that produced construction stone. In 1853 Paunack built a house that is the uphill end of the inn described by this article. That first section was two stories tall, clad in locally quarried sandstone. The low-pitched roof with cornice returns were elements from the Greek Revival style that was popular at the time. One corner is clipped because that's where the property line lay at the time it was built. The Paunacks' house was on an important road leading out of Madison toward southwest Wisconsin, and they soon began hosting travellers there.

But the Paunacks sold the inn after a couple years to a Thomas Griffiths, and he quickly sold it to John Whare, a glass-blower from England. In 1858 Whare probably added a brick section that expanded the capacity of the inn. This downhill end of the building exposes some basement windows and a doorway that led into the inn's taproom. A parlor at the front of the house was the inn's common room, with the kitchen behind it. In the 1860 census John is listed as a tavernkeeper, with wife Isabella and four children. This is when the inn began to be called Plough Inn, since Whare also sold plows to farmers. Whare's inn hosted travelling salesmen, farmers, legislatures, and Union soldiers during the Civil War. Whare operated the inn until 1865.

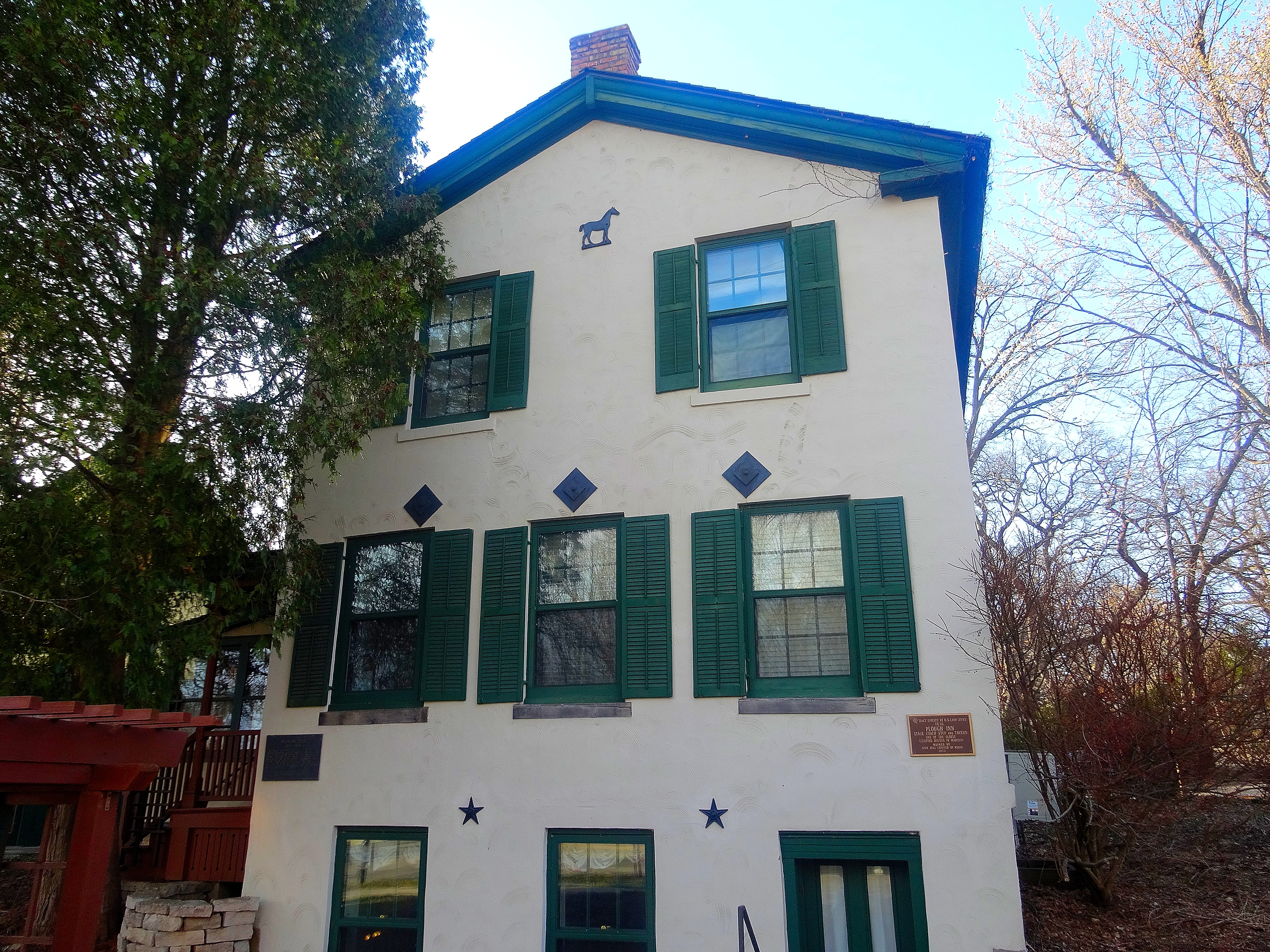

Since then the inn has been called Halfway House, Swain House, and Frey House. Professor Roland Stebbins lived there with his family. The house served as writer's studio, an antique and art shop, and B&B. The original sandstone and brick have been covered with stucco.

IN 1980 the inn was listed on the National Register of Historic Places in 1980 and the State Register of Historic Places in 1989, as an unusual "significant remnant of Madison's early development."
