= Merrill Springs Mound Group II =

- Merrill Springs Mound Group II Archeological District
- U.S. National Register of Historic Places
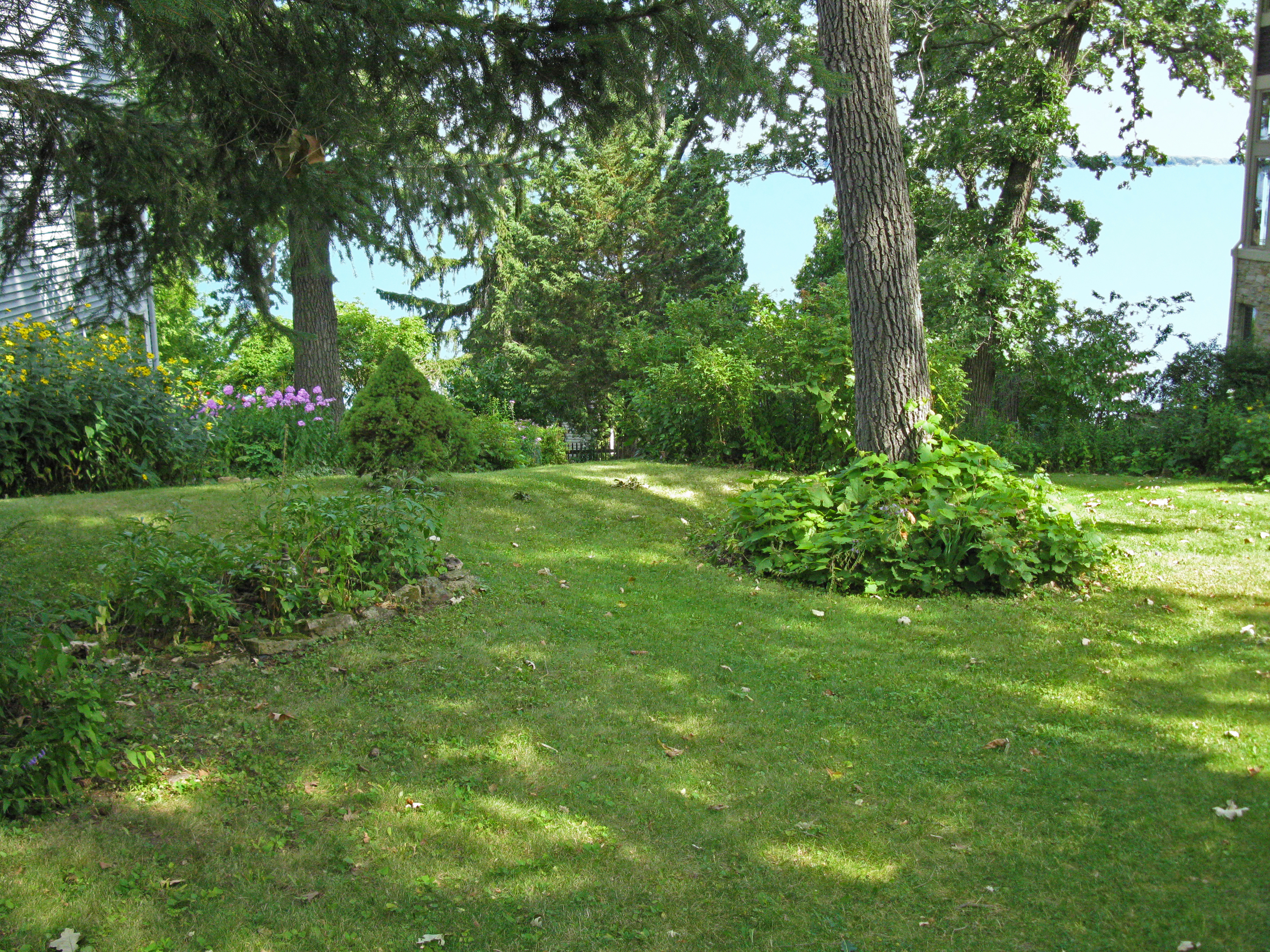

- Location within Wisconsin
- Location: 5030-5046 Lake Mendota Dr., Madison, Wisconsin
- Coordinates: 43°04′52″N 89°27′58″W
- Area: 4 acres (1.6 ha)
- MPS: Late Woodland Stage in Archeological Region 8 MPS
- NRHP reference No.: 91000670
- Added to NRHP: June 7, 1991

Merrill Springs Mound Group II is a group of Native American mounds at 5030-5046 Lake Mendota Drive in Madison, Wisconsin. The group includes six to eight mounds and a nearby village site; it originally included up to 13-20 mounds, but many were destroyed by residential development in the area. It is one of four groups of mounds identified in an 1888 survey of the Merrill Springs resort area, which gives the group its name. The site includes two bear-shaped effigy mounds and an assortment of linear and conical mounds. The mounds were built by Late Woodland people between roughly 800 and 1100 A.D. The village site was also inhabited during the Late Woodland period, and projectile points and bones have been found there.

The site was added to the National Register of Historic Places on June 7, 1991.
