= Blackhawk Country Club Mound Group =

- Blackhawk Country Club Mound Group (47 DA 131)
- U.S. National Register of Historic Places
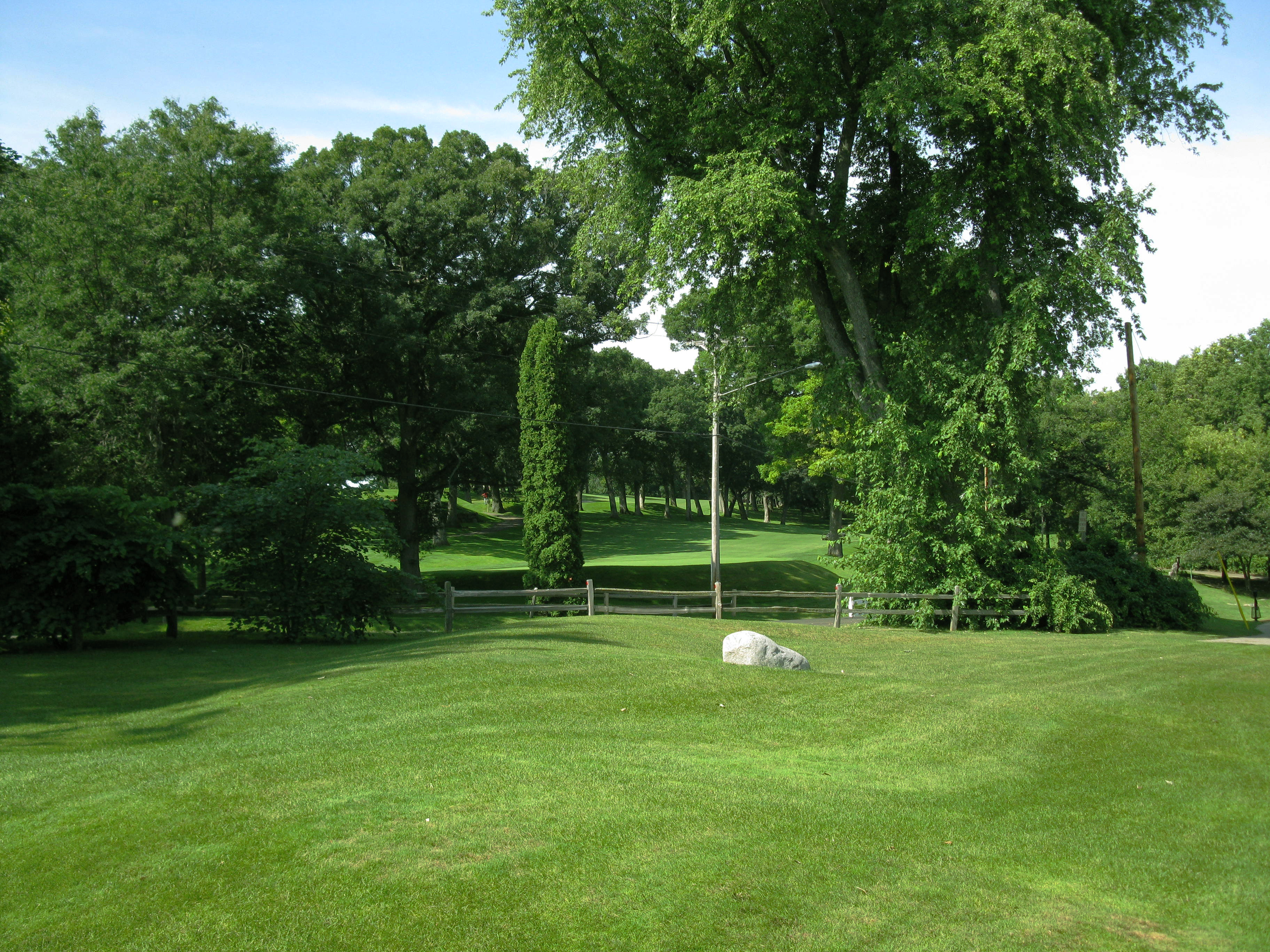

- Location within Wisconsin
- Location: 3606 Blackhawk Dr., Madison, Wisconsin
- Coordinates: 43°04′47″N 89°27′39″W
- Area: 12 acres (4.9 ha)
- NRHP reference No.: 79000068
- Added to NRHP: August 1, 1979

The Blackhawk Country Club Mound Group is a group of Native American mounds on the grounds of Blackhawk Country Club in Madison, Wisconsin. The group includes an effigy mound shaped like a flying goose, three bear-shaped effigy mounds, a panther-shaped effigy, and an assortment of linear and conical mounds. The mounds were built by Late Woodland people between 650 and 1200 A.D.; these people were part of Wisconsin's Effigy Mound Culture, which was responsible for building the many mounds that can be found throughout the state. Country club member L. J. Markwardt convinced the club to preserve the mounds and restore a damaged section of the goose in the 1970s.

The site was added to the National Register of Historic Places on August 1, 1979.
