= Garver Feed Mill =

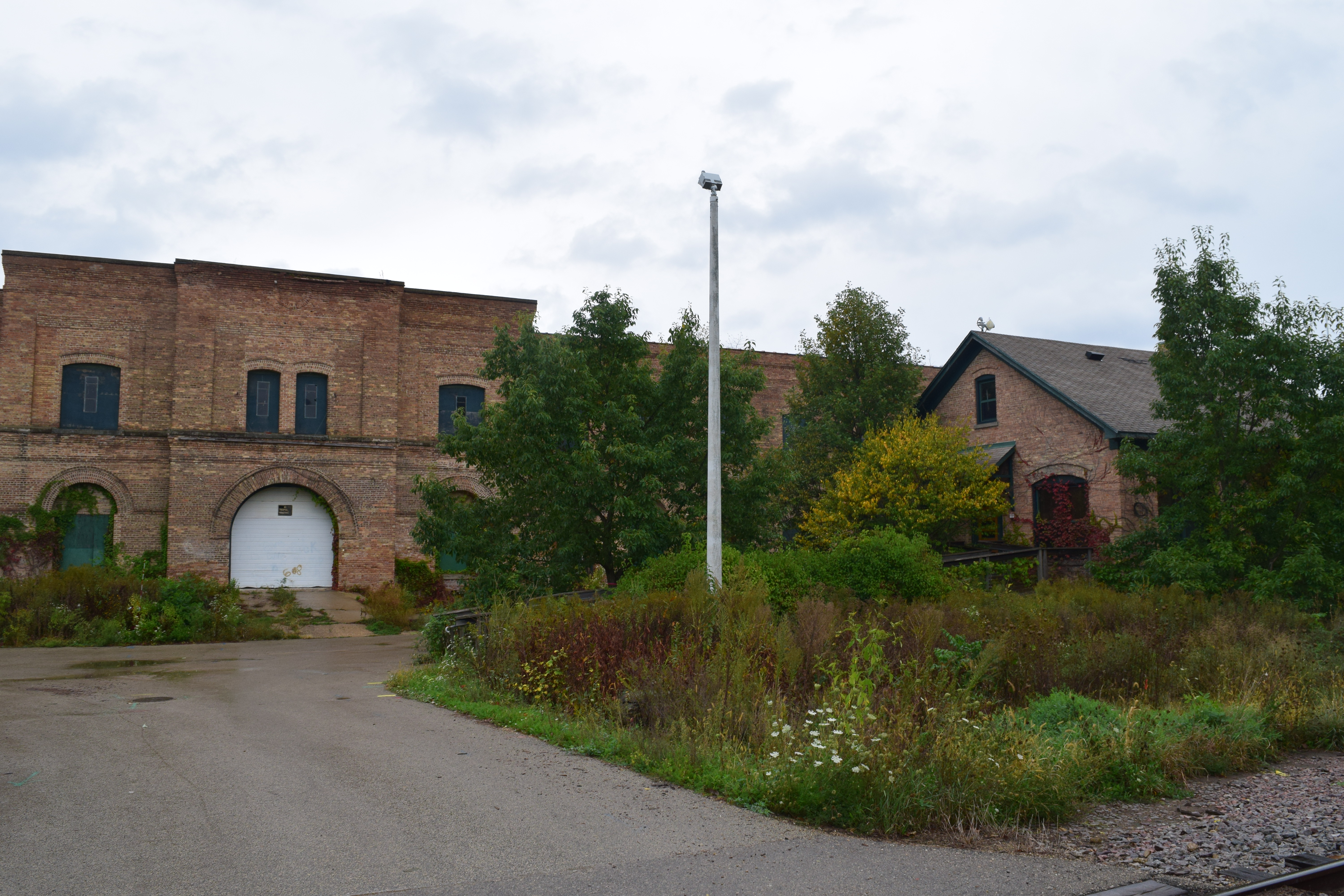
- The south facade of Garver Feed Mill in October 2017 before restoration work began
- Interactive map of the Garver Feed Mill area
- Former names: Garver's Supply Company Factory and Office

General information
- Architectural style: Romanesque
- Location: 3244 Atwood Ave, Madison, Wisconsin, United States
- Coordinates: 43.094537°N 89.334501°W
- Renovated: December 2017 -

Renovating team
- Renovating firm: Baum Revision

Website
- garverfeedmill.com

- Garver's Supply Company Factory and Office
- U.S. National Register of Historic Places
- Location within Wisconsin Location within the United States
- Location: Madison, Wisconsin
- Coordinates: 43.094537°N 89.334501°W
- Built: 1905
- NRHP reference No.: 100001445
- Added to NRHP: August 7, 2017

Garver Feed Mill is a historic building complex located in Madison, Wisconsin, adjacent to Olbrich Botanical Gardens. The building was added to the Wisconsin State Register of Historic Places on May 19, 2017, and to the National Register of Historic Places (listed as "Garver's Supply Company Factory and Office") on August 7, 2017.

The structure was built in 1905 for the U.S. Sugar Company, serving as a sugar beet processing plant from 1906 to 1924. The site was purchased in 1930 by James R. Garver, remodeled and became the main facility for Garver's Supply Company.

As of December 2017, the building and grounds are undergoing restoration to open the site to the public as a venue for local food producers and restaurants and as an event space. The restoration work on the main building is expected to be completed in Spring 2019, after which small lodging structures will be installed to the north of the building. Officials with the city of Madison are hoping that Garver Feed Mill will become a location for second-stage food producers and will serve as an anchor for a "food innovation corridor" in the city.

== History ==
=== U.S. Sugar Company ===
In the early years of the 20th century, sugar beet prices had been rising in Wisconsin at significant rates, generating much interest from farmers and refiners in the area. The main structure that would eventually become Garver Feed Mill was built in 1905 and served the U.S. Sugar Company from 1906 until 1924. In anticipation of its opening, U.S. Sugar placed ads in local newspapers encouraging farmers to plant sugar beets for the Madison factory, promising to pay up to $5 (equivalent to $179 in 2025) per ton. When built, the 200,000 sq ft facility, the fourth sugar beet processing plant in Wisconsin, was the largest factory built in Madison. The site processed up to 500 tons of sugar beets per day.

=== Garver's Supply Company ===
James R. Garver purchased the site in 1930 intending to convert it to make animal feed. His company was originally named Economy Feed Milling Company. After extensive remodeling, which included removing the top two stories of the main building, the ceremonial first batch of pelleted feed was produced in March 1931; but owing to a mistake made by a plant worker, the feed was sprayed outside the building rather than into the output bags as intended. The site was made accessible to truck traffic by 1935 and the company was renamed to Garver's Supply Company, reflecting the wider assortment of products the company offered.

During World War II, Garver's aided the war effort by producing pelleted livestock feed that the company claimed would fatten pigs at about twice the rate of normal feed. The company estimated that they could store approximately 5,000 tons of feed products at this location.

In December 1946, a fire in one of the company's earliest built warehouses caused $75,000 in damages (equivalent to $1,238,268 in 2025).

The site was listed as a property included in a foreclosure sale on October 27, 1972.

=== Disuse and redevelopment proposals ===
After Garver left the property, the buildings sat disused for some time. A proposal was made in 1990 to convert the main building to hold apartments with development work described by Phil Sveum at a public meeting nearby. The Olbrich Botanical Society purchased the site in 1997.

== Renovation ==
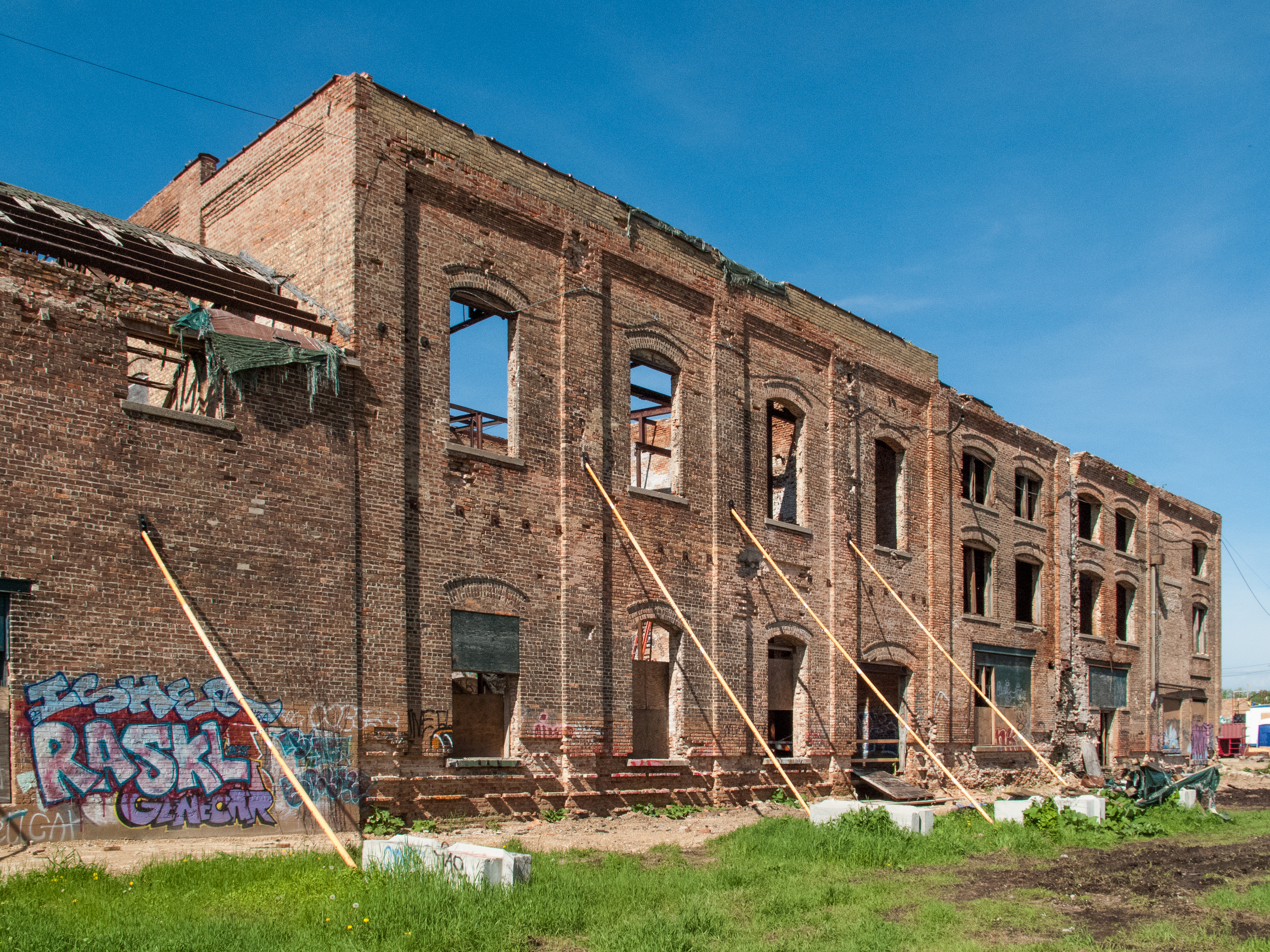
The north facade during restoration work in May 2018

Renovation work on the main building began in earnest in December 2017.
