= Halvorson Mound Group =

- U.S. National Register of Historic Places
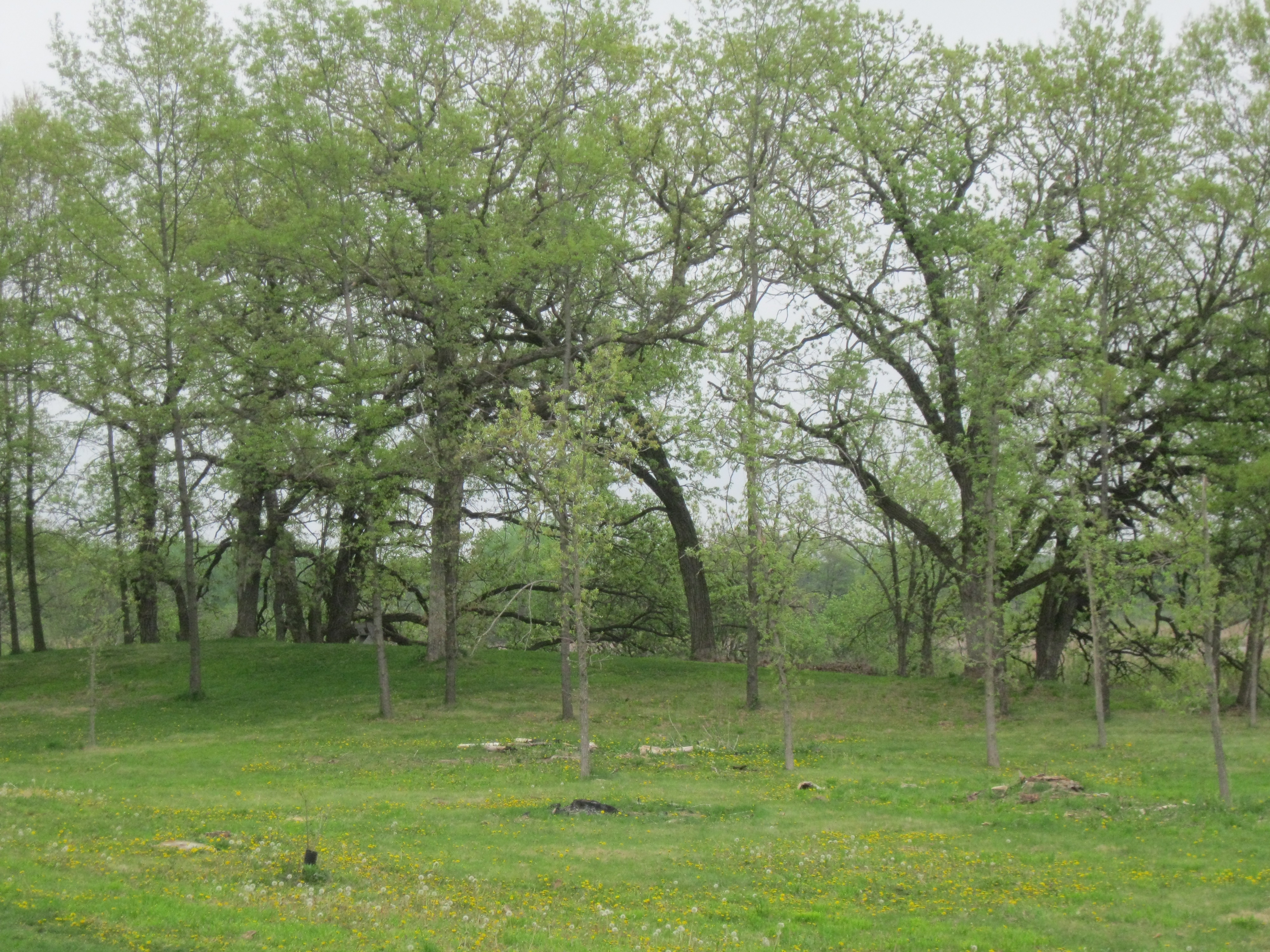

- Location within Wisconsin
- Location: Yahara Heights County Park, Madison, Wisconsin
- Coordinates: 43°09′17″N 89°23′31″W
- Area: 1 acre (0.40 ha)
- MPS: Late Woodland Stage in Archeological Region 8 MPS
- NRHP reference No.: 93000215
- Added to NRHP: March 25, 1993

The Halvorson Mound Group is a group of Native American mounds in Yahara Heights County Park in Madison, Wisconsin. The group includes panther- and bear-shaped effigy mounds as well as an oval-shaped mound; a second panther mound and a linear mound were also once part of the site but were destroyed by farming. The remaining panther mound is a relatively large example at 228 feet (69 m) long. The mounds were built by Late Woodland people roughly between 800 and 1100 A.D. Charles E. Brown and Rev. F. A. Gilmore conducted the first survey of the mounds in 1911.

The site was added to the National Register of Historic Places on March 25, 1993.
