= Mills Woods Mound =

- U.S. National Register of Historic Places
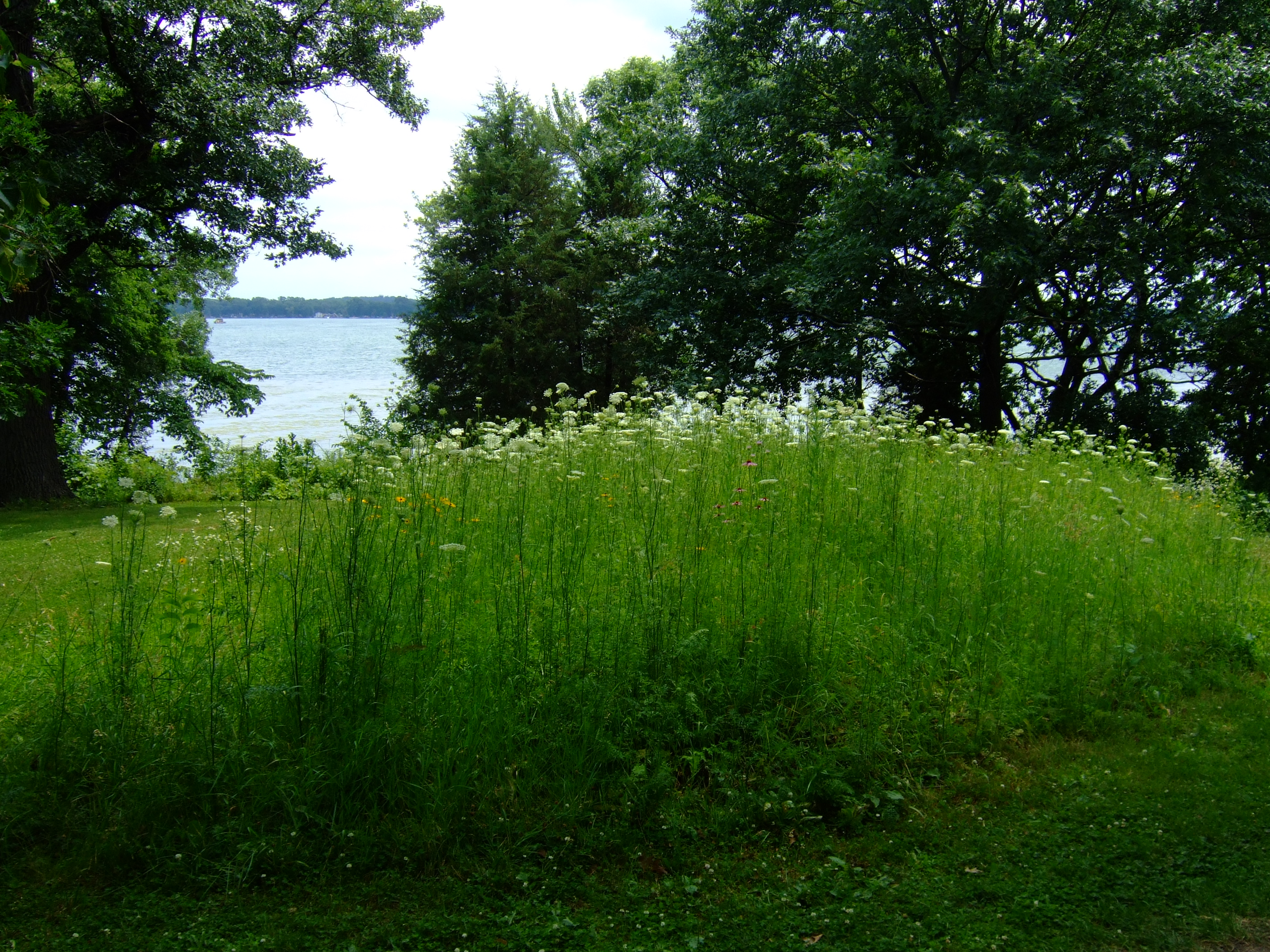

- Location within Wisconsin Location within the United States
- Interactive map showing the location of Mills Woods Mound
- Location: Hudson Park, corner of Hudson and Lakeland, Madison, Wisconsin
- Coordinates: 43°05′24″N 89°20′43″W
- Area: less than one acre
- MPS: Late Woodland Stage in Archeological Region 8 MPS
- NRHP reference No.: 91000667
- Added to NRHP: June 7, 1991

The Mills Woods Mound, also known as the Hudson Park Mound, is a Native American mound in Hudson Park in Madison, Wisconsin. It is an animal-shaped effigy mound with a long tail, though the exact animal it represents is unclear. The mound was once part of the large Mills Woods Mound Group, which included roughly thirty mounds of various shapes, but construction destroyed every other mound in the group. The mound group was built during the Late Woodland period, roughly between 800 and 1100 A.D., by a Mound Builder group; the Mound Builders used mounds for burials and ceremonial purposes. The mound is one of less than 60 effigy mounds remaining in Dane County, which once had 289 of the mounds, and has potential archaeological significance for the study of Late Woodland civilizations.

The mound was added to the National Register of Historic Places on June 7, 1991.
