= Wakeley-Giles Commercial Building =

- U.S. National Register of Historic Places
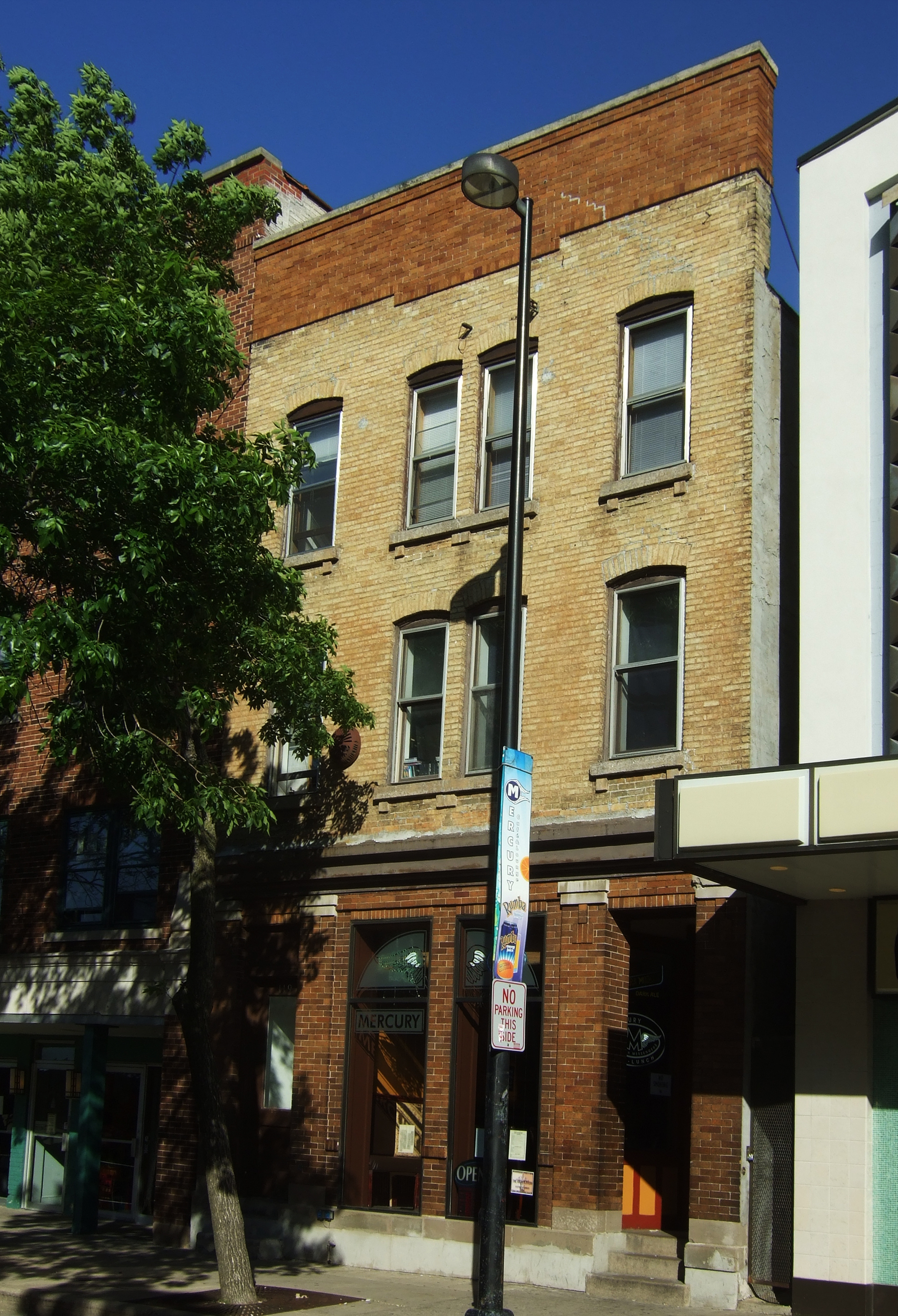
- Wakeley-Giles Commercial Building
- Location: 117-119 E. Mifflin St., Madison, Wisconsin
- Coordinates: 43°04′36″N 89°23′00″W
- Area: less than one acre
- Built: 1869
- NRHP reference No.: 88000081
- Added to NRHP: February 23, 1988

The Wakeley-Giles Commercial Building is a historic building at 117–119 E. Mifflin Street in Madison, Wisconsin. It was built circa 1869 as rental housing and was converted to commercial use in the 1880s. The building's name comes from its first two owners, attorney Charles Wakeley and H.H. Giles. In 1911, Norwegian American author and publisher Rasmus B. Anderson moved the offices of his newspaper Amerika into the building. Anderson founded the newspaper in 1898 after becoming an established scholar of Norwegian and Scandinavian history in order to spread his views to the Norwegian American community. The paper had a peak circulation of roughly 10,000 subscribers, placing it in the top ten Norwegian American newspapers nationally at the time. Anderson closed the newspaper and retired in 1922, and the building was used by the Kilgore Printing Company from then until the 1970s.

The building was listed on the National Register of Historic Places in 1988 and on the State Register of Historic Places the following year.
