= Pete Schmitt =

American football player (born 1984)

Profile
- Position: Fullback

Personal information
- Born: October 14, 1984 (age 42); Madison, Wisconsin
- Listed height: 6 ft 1 in (1.85 m)
- Listed weight: 248 lb (112 kg)

Career information
- High school: Mount Horeb (WI)
- College: Wisconsin–Whitewater
- NFL draft: 2007: undrafted

Career history
- Washington Redskins (2007–2008)*
- * Offseason or practice squad member only

Awards and highlights
- First-team All-WIAC (2006); Second-team All-West Region (2006); Second-team D3Football.com All-American (2006); Third-team Football Gazette All-American (2006)

Pete Schmitt (born October 14, 1984) is an American former football fullback. He was signed by the Washington Redskins as an undrafted free agent in 2007. He played college football at Wisconsin–Whitewater.

== Early life ==
Schmitt attended high school at Mount Horeb High School in Mount Horeb, Wisconsin where he earned All-Conference and All-Area honors in football. He was also an All-State punter. He also lettered three years in basketball and was an All-Conference pick and lettered four years in track and field. Schmitt is the school record holder in the discus throw.

== College career ==
Schmitt played college football at the University of Wisconsin–Whitewater where he played tight end. He was selected First-team All-WIAC, Second-team D3football.com All-America and Third-team Football Gazette All-America. Schmitt started 40 of 50 games and helped lead the team to conference championships in 2005 and 2006, along with two DIII national championship game appearances. He finished his career with 108 catches for 1,231 yards and 15 touchdowns.

== Professional career ==
=== Washington Redskins ===
Schmitt was signed by the Washington Redskins as an undrafted free agent in May 2007, but was waived at the end of the preseason with an injury settlement. He re-signed with the Redskins on March 27, 2008, but released again on July 19. He was re-signed again on August 4 after the team released Stuart Schweigert and Danny Verdun-Wheeler. He was released three days later.
