= Beatty (& Beatty) & Strang =

1930s architectural firm in Wisconsin, US

Hamilton Beatty, Gwenydd (Chewett) Beatty, and Allen Strang were architects who together designed the first International Style buildings in and around Madison, Wisconsin from 1930 to 1941. The Beattys worked together on a houses and proposed plans from 1930 to 1934, while Strang designed two houses outside of Madison in 1934. Beginning in 1935, Hamilton Beatty and Strang worked together on at least 36 houses, school additions, and some proposed plans. (Gwenydd Beatty apparently had no role in that work.) In 1940, Beatty left Madison and became an industrial designer. In 1942, Strang went to Chicago to work for the Federal Housing Authority.

== Backgrounds ==
Hamilton (Ham) Beatty (1907-1992) was born in Madison. His father was a professor in the English Department at the University of Wisconsin-Madison. Although asked by his father to take a degree in English, Beatty also studied architecture at the Bartlett School of Architecture at University College, London, and worked for a local architect during the summer. While in England, he met Gwenydd Chewett, also a student at Bartlett. They married in 1929. After a regular job was ended by the stock market crash, Ham worked voluntarily under Le Corbusier until 1930. The couple then moved to Madison.

Allen Strang (1906-1996) was born in Richland Center, Wisconsin. Strang studied engineering at the University of Wisconsin, then architecture at the University of Pennsylvania. A travelling fellowship allowed him to spend a year touring Europe in 1931. He worked under Paul Cret in Philadelphia and Law, Law & Potter in Madison before returning to Richland Center to open his own practice. In 1935, he moved to Madison to go into business with Ham Beatty; they had been fraternity brothers.

== Pioneering work ==
In 1931, the Beatty's designed two modern houses in the Frost Woods development in what is now Monona, Wisconsin, outside of Madison. Starting in 1935, Beatty and Strang designed 14 additional modern houses there, including the NRHP listed Willard and Fern Tompkins House. (Several of those houses were for members of the UW English Department.) It is the first and largest group of International Style buildings in Wisconsin. The greater Frost Woods area was entered on the National Register of Historic Places in February 2026.

The rest of Beatty and Strang's houses were in Madison and its suburbs. The firm designed school additions in southern Wisconsin, as well as submitted plans to competitions and periodicals. They were featured in the journals Architectural Record and Architectural Forum, among others. Their largest and most elaborate house, for Mr. and Mrs. Toby Curtis, was featured in Patrick Abercrombie's "The Book of the Modern House" in 1939. After World War II, Allen Strang returned to Madison and led several architectural firms until he retired in 1977. Beatty became an executive with the construction company he had joined before the war. The State Historical Society of Wisconsin publication "Cultural Resource Management in Wisconsin" placed Beatty & Strang in their list of "Notable Architects and Firms".

== Other sources ==
- Monona in the Making: History of the City of Pride, 1938-1975, 1999, Dorothy Browne Haines, Historic Blooming Grove Historical Society, Monona, WI.
- https://www.mymonona.com/1660/International-Style-Homes
