= Madison Masonic Temple (Madison, Wisconsin) =

- U.S. National Register of Historic Places
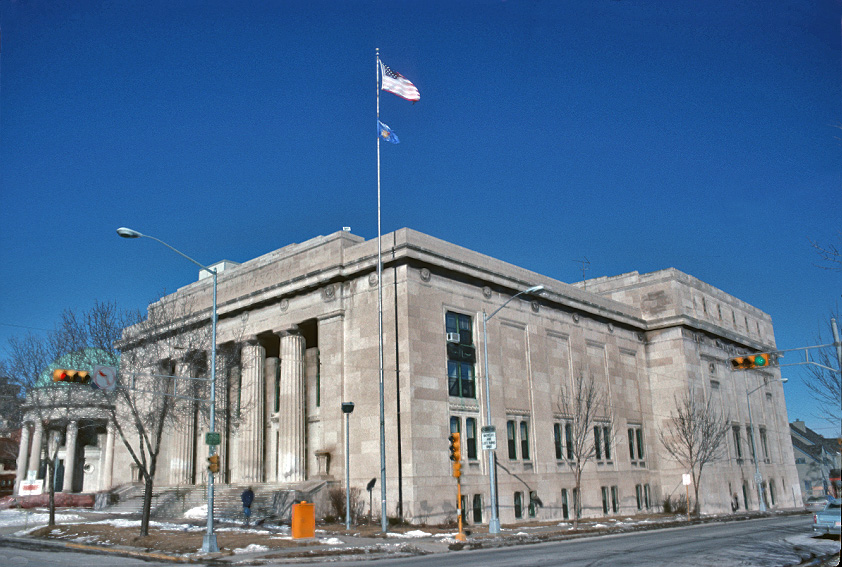

- Location within Wisconsin Location within the United States
- Location: 301 Wisconsin Ave., Madison, Wisconsin
- Coordinates: 43°4′39″N 89°23′12″W
- Area: less than one acre
- Built: 1923
- Built by: Findorff, J.H., & Son
- Architect: Law & Law
- Architectural style: Classical Revival
- NRHP reference No.: 90001456
- Added to NRHP: September 13, 1990

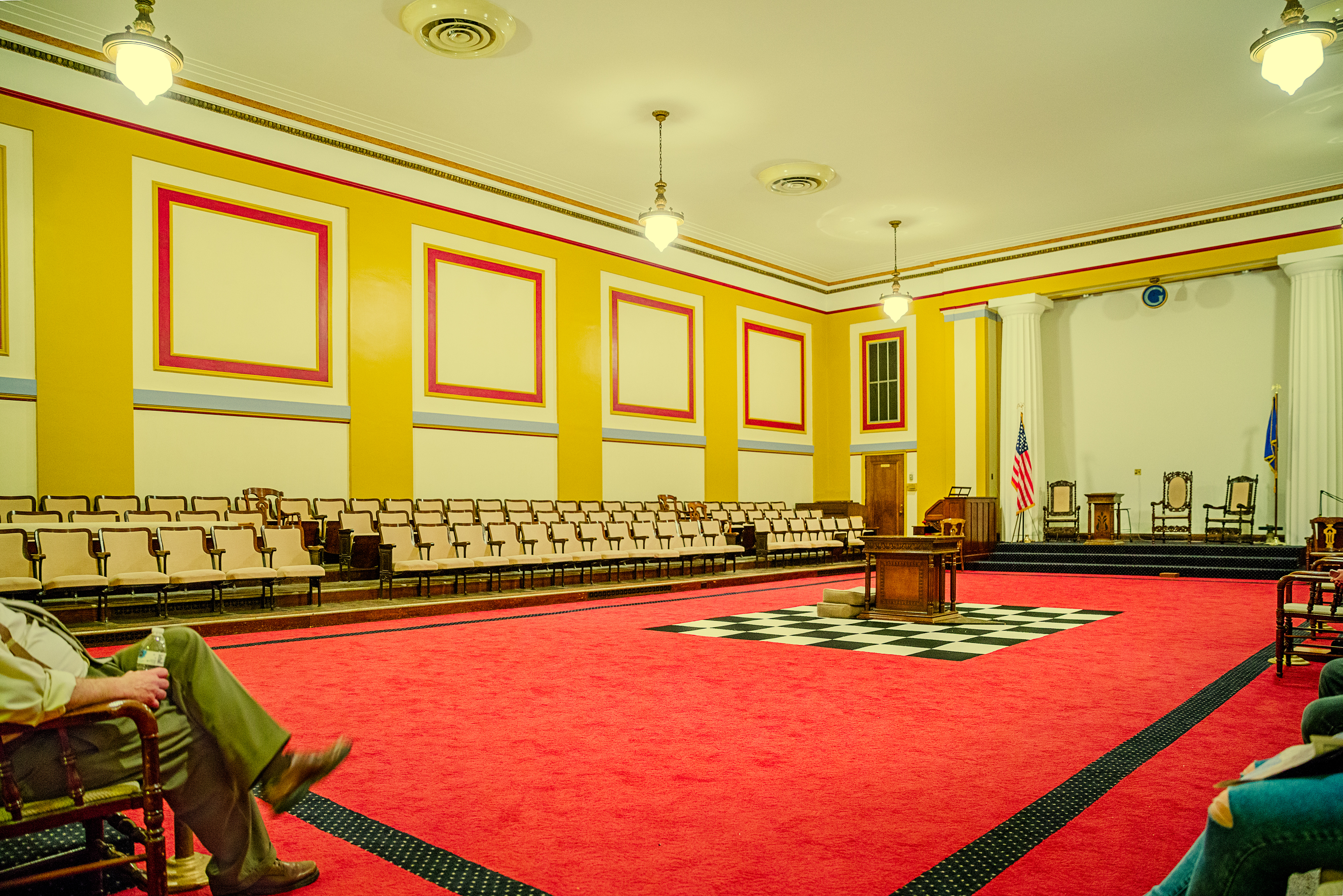
One of the large rooms used by Masons for meetings.

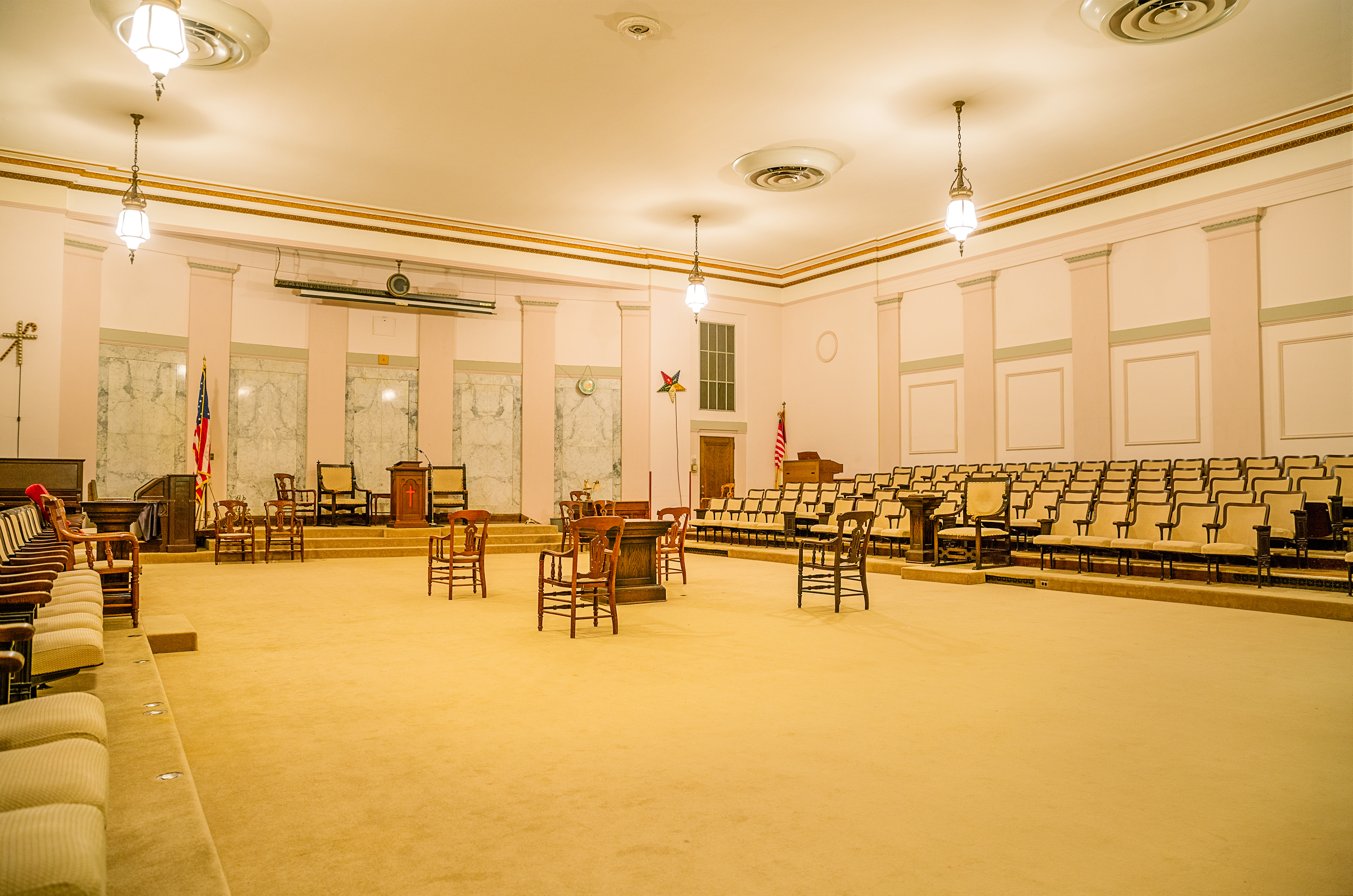
Large room for Mason meetings.

The Madison Masonic Temple is a masonic temple located in Madison, Wisconsin. Designed by Madison architects James R. and Edward J. Law in 1915 and redesigned after World War I in 1922, the temple was built during 1923 to 1925. It was listed on the National Register of Historic Places in 1990.

It is a three-story building with four colossal columns in its front facade, with its three main entrances set back from them. It is 112 by 182 feet (34 m × 55 m) in plan and has a large, 1200-plus seat auditorium in its rear section.

The auditorium and other spaces are used by the public for rehearsals and performances.
