= Jefferson Avenue Historic District (Janesville, Wisconsin) =

Historic district in Wisconsin, United States

- U.S. National Register of Historic Places
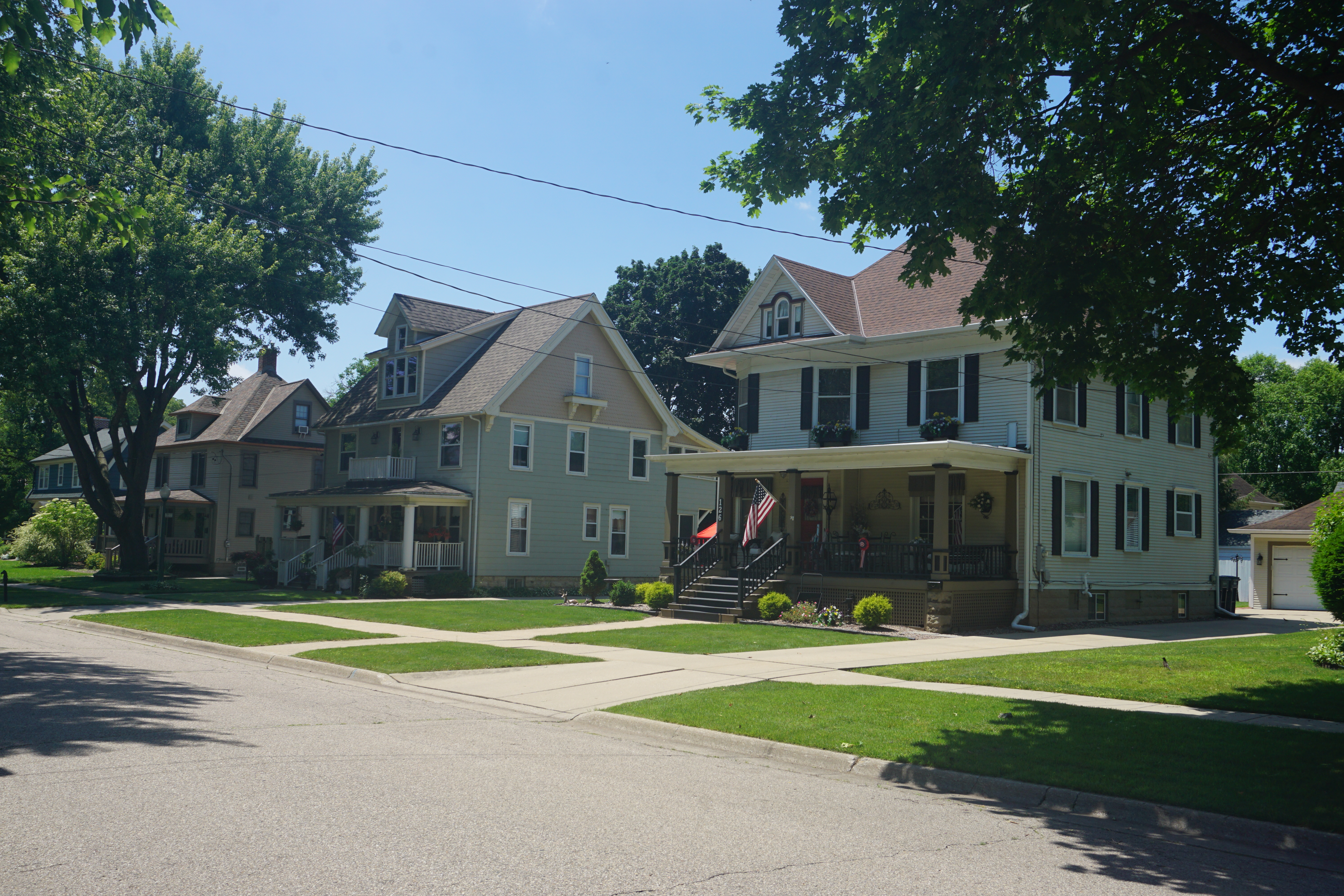
- A portion of the district.
- Location: Bounded by Oakland, Garfield and Ruger Aves. and Forest Park Blvd., Janesville, Wisconsin
- Area: 21 acres (8.5 ha)
- NRHP reference No.: 06000300
- Added to NRHP: April 19, 2006

The Jefferson Avenue Historic District in Janesville, Wisconsin is a historic neighborhood east of the downtown of mostly middle-class homes built from 1891 to the 1930s. It was added to the State and the National Register of Historic Places in 2006.

Starting with Janesville's founding in the 1830s, most of its early neighborhoods grew west of the Rock River. After the Civil War, homes were built east of the river too. Homes in what is now the Jefferson Avenue district were built from 1891 to the 1930s in styles of that period. Here are some good examples of the different styles, roughly in the order built.

- The Harry and Lillian Brown house at 1018 Oakland Ave is a 2-story cream brick Queen Anne-style house built around 1891. It has the complex roof, asymmetry, and fish-scale shingles in the gable peaks typical of the style. Harry owned Brown Bros. Shoes and Boots on E. Milwaukee Street.
- The N.B. Robinson house at 115 S Garfield is a 2-story Queen Anne-style house built in 1895. Like the Brown house it is asymmetric, with a complex roof, and shingles in the gable ends. Unlike the Brown house above, the walls are clad with clapboard and an asymmetric porch wraps around one corner of the house - a typical feature of Queen Annes. The porch is framed with turned posts and spindles. A matching carriage house sits behind the house.
- The Helen & William Jones house at 102 Forest Park Blvd is a 2.5-story house built in 1908, with elements from various styles. The general form is a cube - the American Foursquare style that was becoming popular then. The complex roofline and rudimentary corner tower/bay are drawn from Queen Anne style. And the columns supporting the porch come from the Colonial Revival style that was also becoming popular. Henry Jones was a real estate dealer.
- The Edwin & Mary Bailey house at 102 Jefferson Ave is also at its core an American Foursquare house, but this one has a Neoclassical portico on the front with four colossal Tuscan columns. Edwin was a partner in Pond and Bailey, which dealt in "ladies clothing."
- The William P. & Jessie Langdon house at 1024 Oakland Ave is a Dutch Colonial Revival house built in 1920. The signature feature of this style is the house's gambrel roof. William was a building contractor and real estate dealer.
- The Harry & Clara Summers house at 334 Jefferson Ave is a 2-story brick house built in 1921. It hints at Prairie Style in its low-pitched roof, bands of casement windows, and the bold horizontal lines in the front porch and sun room. Harry was an architect.
- The William Lathrop house at 302 Jefferson Ave is a 2-story brown brick Georgian Revival house built in 1925. Typical elements of the style are the symmetry, hip roof, and brick exterior. William headed an insurance agency.
- The Bernard & Claribel Palmer house at 323 S Garfield Ave is a 2-story house on a large lot designed in fine Colonial Revival style by Madison architect Frank Riley and built in 1926. Bernard was the son of a founder of Parker Pen, an attorney, and a civic leader.
- The Fifield house at 200 S Garfield Ave is a 2.5-story Tudor Revival house designed by Law, Law & Potter of Madison and built in 1928. The steep roof surfaces and half-timbering are typical elements of the style. Fifield was a physician.
- The Stanley & Lydia Anderson house at 226 Forest Park Blvd is a 2-story Modern-style house clad in concrete and built in 1941. Stanley was a plastering contractor.
