= Willard and Fern Tompkins House =

1937 structure on the National Register of Historic Places

- U.S. National Register of Historic Places
- Location: Monona, Wisconsin
- Coordinates: 43.0582°N 89.3370°W
- Built: 1937
- Architect: Hamilton Beatty & Allen Strang
- Architectural style: International Style
- NRHP reference No.: 100009539
- Added to NRHP: 2023

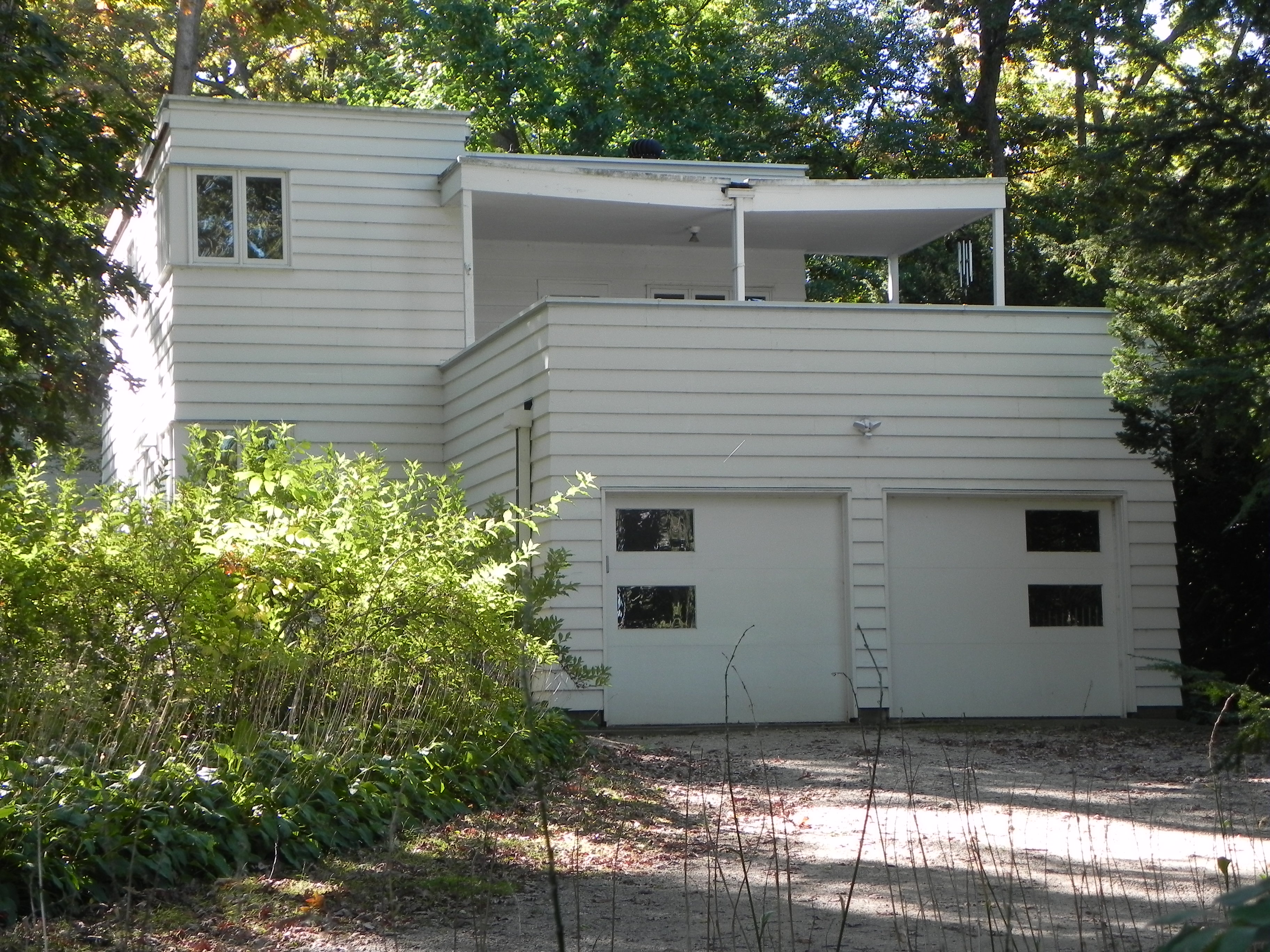
National Register of Historic Places listed house in Frost Woods historic district

The Willard and Fern Tompkins House is a single-family home built in 1937, designed by the Madison, Wisconsin firm of Beatty and Strang. It was part of the Frost Woods development in neighboring Monona. The house is an early example of the International Style that was beginning to take hold in the United States. It was added to the Wisconsin State Register of Historic Places on August 18, 2024 (#5585) and the National Register of Historic Places on November 14, 2023 (#100009539).

The house has two stories, a basement and an attached two-car garage, with three bedrooms and a covered porch on the second floor. It has a flat roof and simple rectangular massing. Many of its bands of casement windows are wrapped around an exterior corner. The siding is lapped cypress.
