= West Lawn Heights Historic District =

Historic district in Wisconsin, United States

- U.S. National Register of Historic Places
- U.S. Historic district
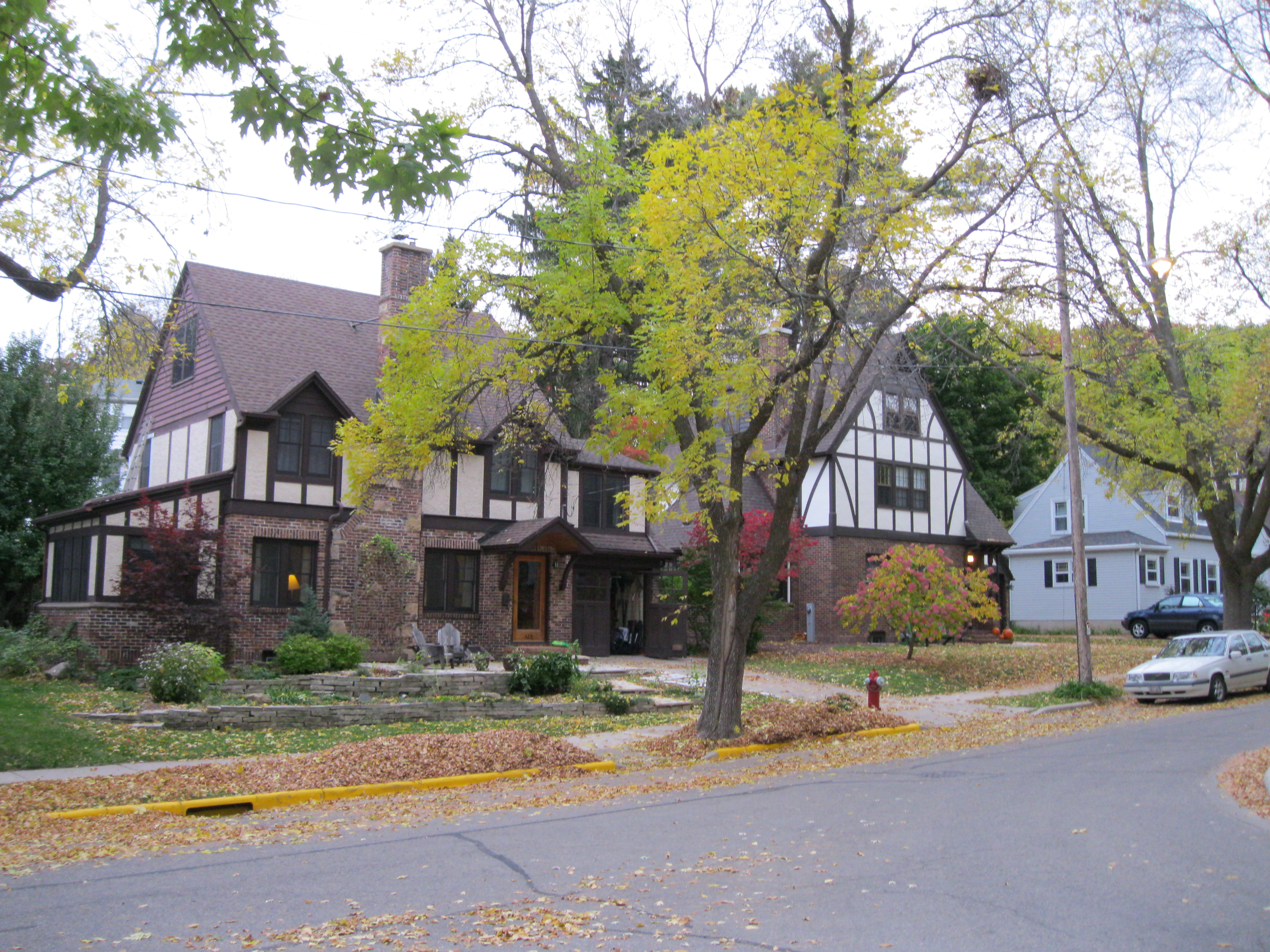
- Houses on Hillington Way

- Location within Wisconsin Location within the United States
- Location: Roughly bounded by Virginia Ter., Regent St., S. Spooner Ave., and Illinois Central Railroad, Madison, Wisconsin
- Coordinates: 43°3′56″N 89°25′26″W
- Area: 77 acres (31 ha)
- NRHP reference No.: 98000223
- Added to NRHP: March 5, 1998

West Lawn Heights Historic District is a residential historic district on the near west side of Madison, Wisconsin. The district encompasses 403 buildings, nearly all of which are houses, spread over roughly 23 city blocks. It was added to the National Register of Historic Places in 1998.

== History ==
The district consisted of farmland until 1903, when the West Lawn development was platted; the neighboring West Lawn Heights and Hillington developments followed in 1908 and 1917 respectively. The historically significant houses in the district were constructed from 1906 to 1946. Prior to 1920, 62 houses were built in the district, mainly in popular contemporary styles such as Prairie School, American Craftsman, and bungalow. Madison architect Alvan E. Small designed several of these early houses, including his own residence. The majority of the district's houses were built after 1920 in period revival styles, primarily Colonial Revival and Tudor Revival. These later houses include works by architects Henry T. Dysland, John J. Flad, Law, Law & Potter, and Frank M. Riley.

== Gallery ==
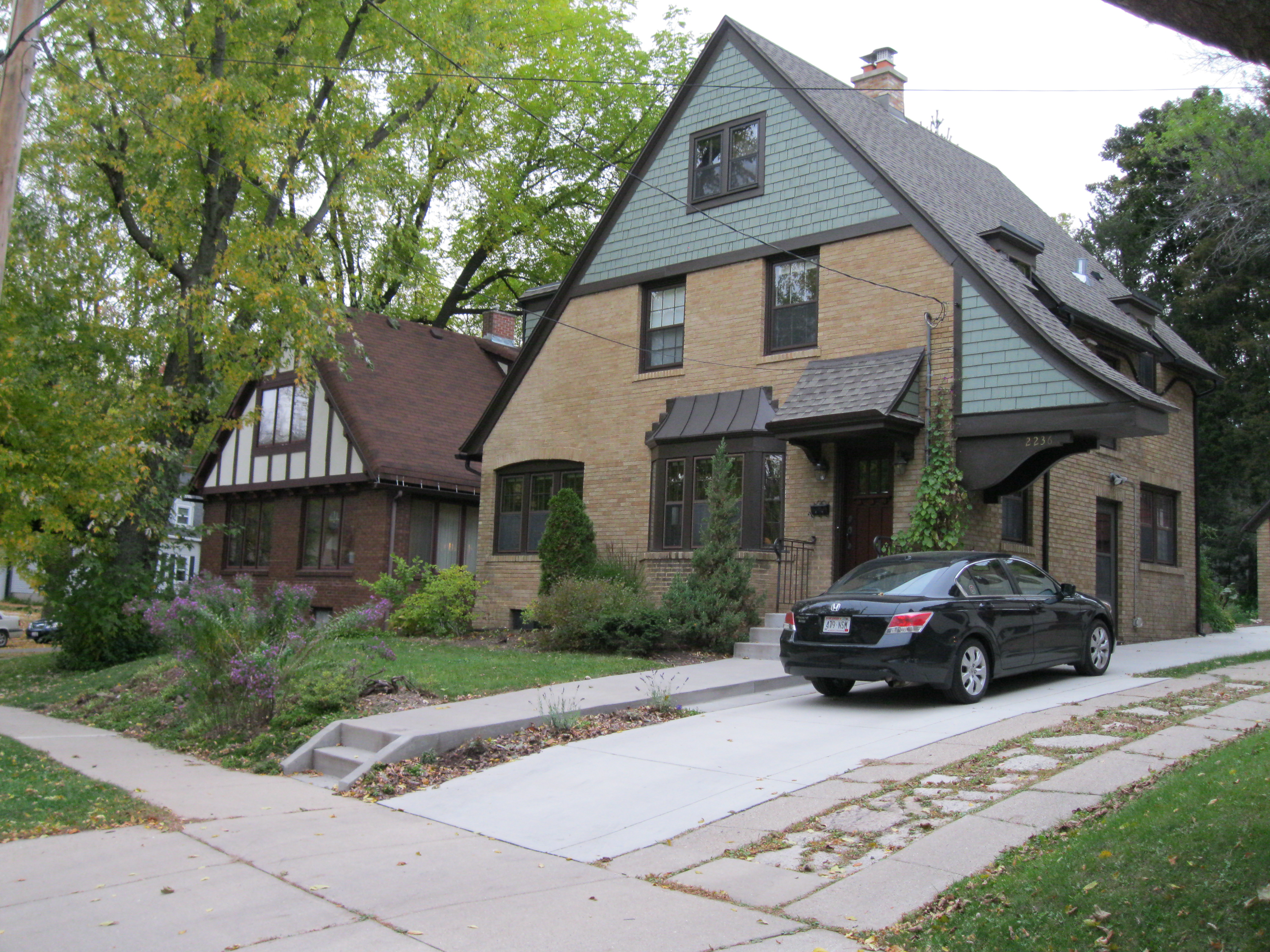
Houses on Hillington Green

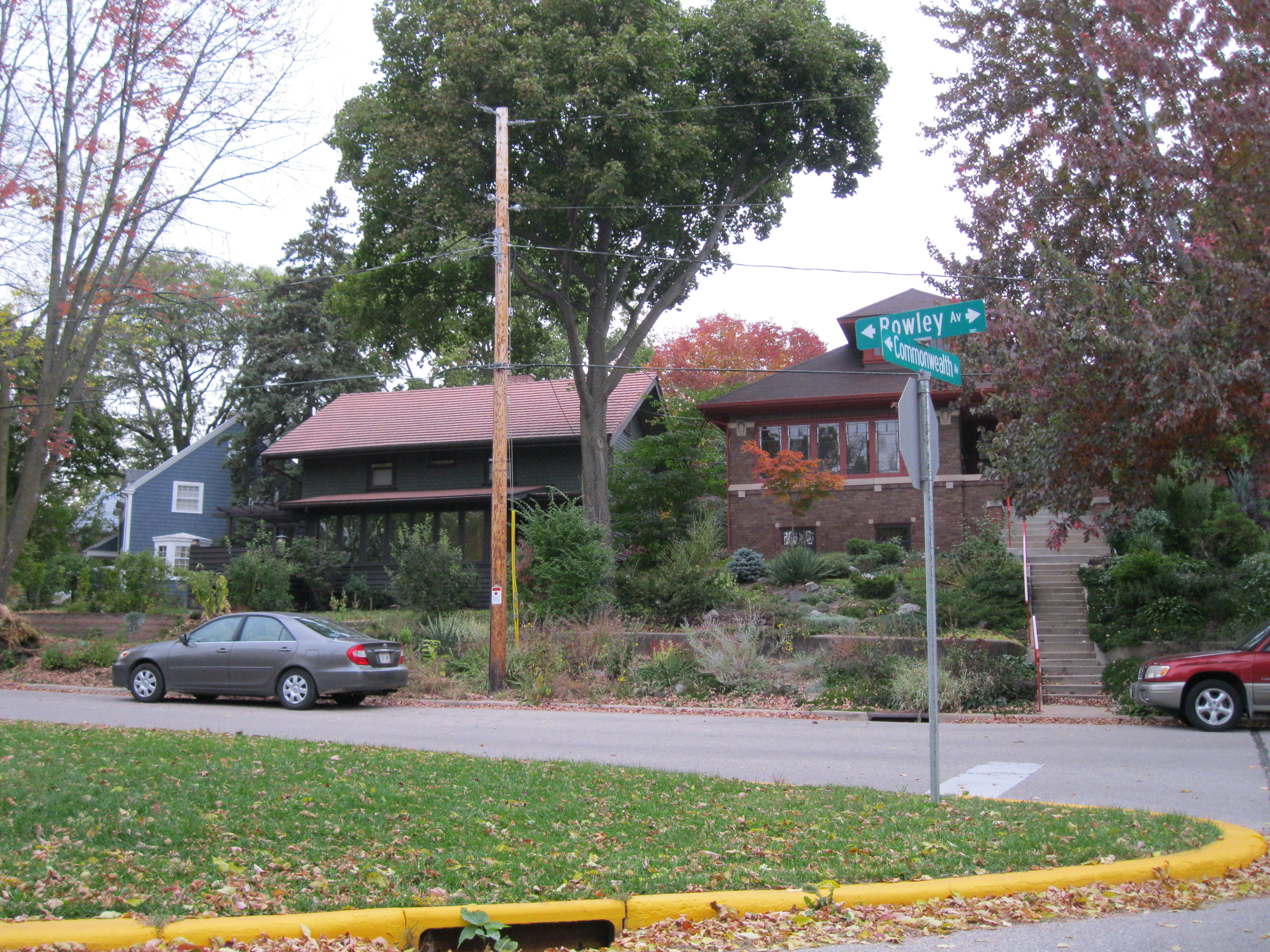
Houses on Rowley Avenue
