= Madison Vocational School =

- U.S. National Register of Historic Places
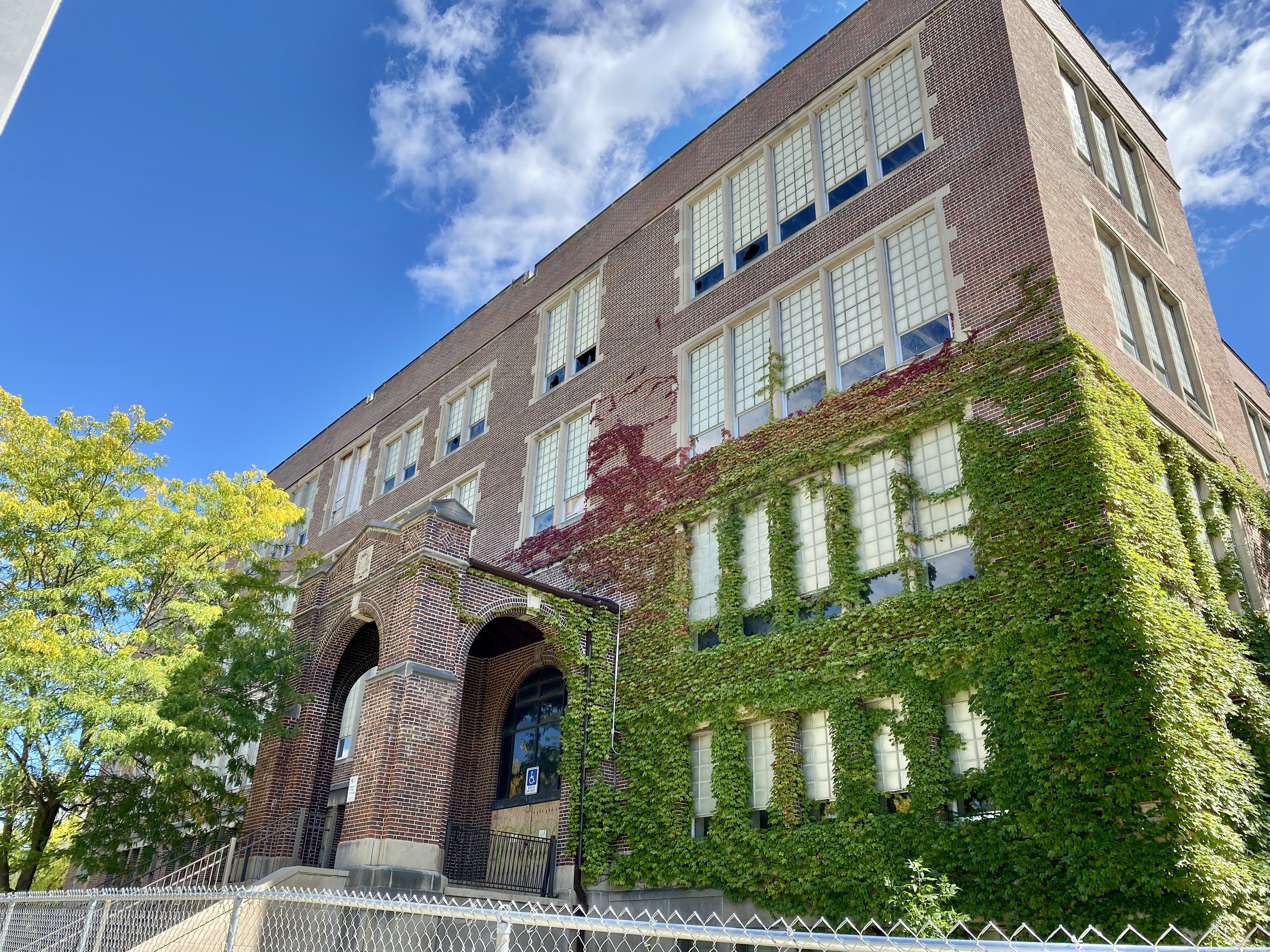
- Madison Vocational School
- Location: 211 N. Carroll St. Madison, Wisconsin
- Built: 1921/1949-1950/1964
- Architect: Ferdinand Kronenberg/Law, Law, Potter, & Nystrom
- Architectural style: Collegiate Gothic
- NRHP reference No.: 100003545; 100009436 (decrease)

Significant dates
- Added to NRHP: March 21, 2019
- Boundary decrease: October 10, 2023

The Madison Vocation School is a Collegiate Gothic-style structure begun in 1921 one block north of the Capitol building in Madison, Wisconsin. In 2019 it was added to the National Register of Historic Places.

== History ==
In the early 1900s the Wisconsin legislature recognized that some youths who had not finished high school needed more education, and passed the Continuation School Act in 1911. The Madison Continuation School opened the following year, providing instruction in the trades, "but also literature, math, social sciences and the arts, and help[ed] to fulfill a primary goal of public education: training for good citizenship."

The school's name was changed to Madison Vocational School in 1916 and it moved to this site in 1921, in a new building designed by Ferdinand Kronenberg, four stories of brick in Collegiate Gothic style. A 1949 addition designed by Law, Law, Potter and Nystrom was simpler in style and was expanded in 1964.

The school's name was changed again in 1967 to Madison Area Technical College. The college has since sold the building, and it proposed plans to convert it into a hotel building.
