= Thorstrand =

Historic house in Wisconsin, United States

- U.S. National Register of Historic Places
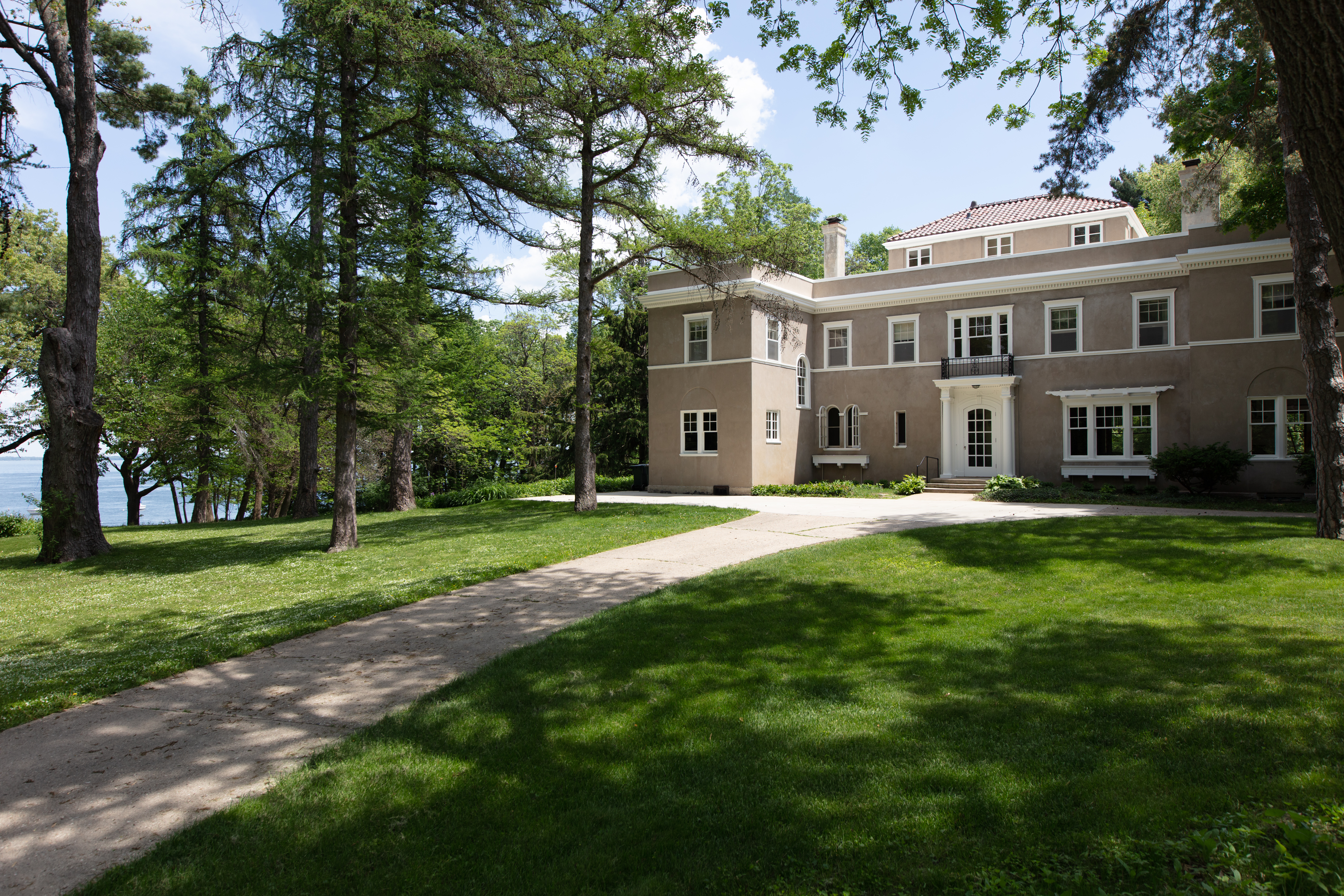
- North House, summer of 2018

- Location within Wisconsin Location within the United States
- Location: 1-2 Thorstrand Rd., Madison, Wisconsin
- Coordinates: 43°05′28″N 89°28′56″W
- Built: 1922
- Architect: Law & Law
- Architectural style: Late 19th and 20th Century Mediterranean Revival
- NRHP reference No.: 80000131
- Added to NRHP: August 11, 1980

Thorstrand is the historic estate of a prominent Norwegian immigrant near the west end of Lake Mendota in Madison, Wisconsin. It was listed on the National Register of Historic Places in 1980 and on the State Register of Historic Places in 1989.

== History ==
Originally 50 acres (20 ha) of cornfield, the land was purchased in the 1890s by Magnus Swenson (1854-1936), a Norwegian who immigrated to America at age 14, and made his way from working as a blacksmith's helper to a career as a chemical engineer, an internationally known inventor, businessman and humanitarian. Among his many achievements, Swenson patented over 200 machines and processes, built hydroelectric dams on the Wisconsin River at Wisconsin Dells and Prairie du Sac, and founded the Norwegian-American Steamship Lines.

Magnus Swenson named the property “Thorstrand” (which means “Thor’s Beach” in Norwegian) after the place where he grew up in Norway. The road from University Ave through this land still bears the name Thorstrand Rd.

Magnus, his wife Annie and their four daughters, lived near the capitol square in Madison and would make regular trips to the property to picnic and plant a variety of trees, until 1922, when they had two Mediterranean Revival style homes built there, designed by Madison Architects Law and Law. One house was for Magnus and Annie Swenson (#2 Thorstrand Rd.), the other for his married daughter, Mary Swenson North (#1 Thorstrand Rd).

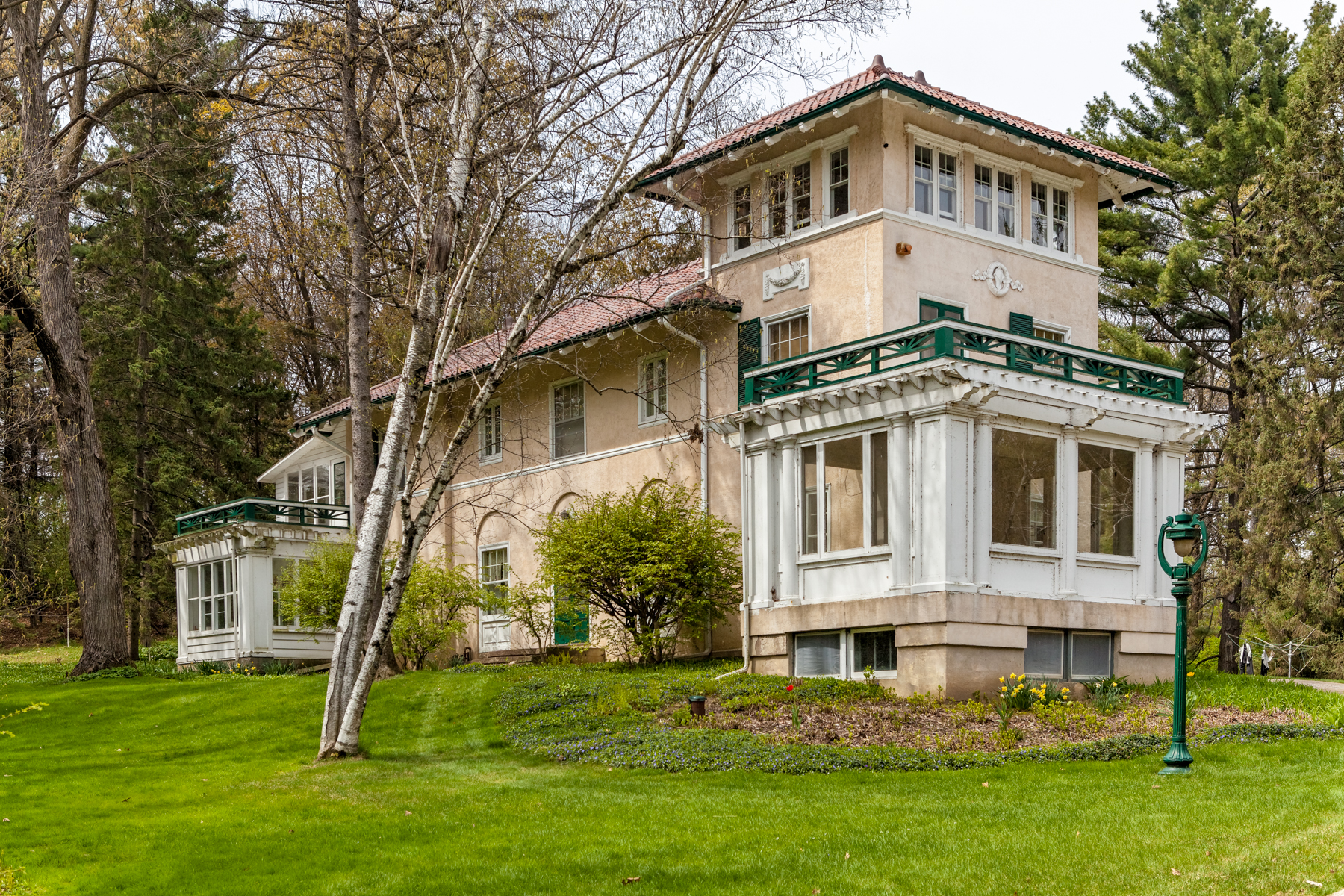
Swenson house

Magnus and Annie's house is an asymmetric two-story mansion with a 3-story tower, clad in stucco, with low-pitched hip rooves covered in red tile. An arcade next to the entrance features three stained glass windows designed by Swenson himself, showing a Viking ship, the Wisconsin State Capitol, and one of Norwegian-American's steamships. Porches flanking the house were originally open, but have been closed in.

The Mary North house is a separate mansion, closer to the lake - a more formal design with a symmetric facade, a heavy cornice and entablature, two tall chimneys and a cupola with a red tile roof. Its front door is flanked by classical columns.

Over the years, some of the land was sold. After Mary Swenson North died in 1977, the remaining 15.29 acre estate was sold to the City of Madison in 1978, to be preserved as an addition to “Marshall Park”, for use as a passive recreation area. When it was learned that the homes would likely be demolished, they were declared Madison Historic Landmarks, protecting them from such a fate.

The homes were subsequently sold to individuals, but the land continues to be owned by the city and a portion associated with each home is leased to the homeowner through a 99-year land lease agreement. Mary Swenson North's daughter, Mary North O’Hare, bought back her mother's home, and it has remained in the family since that time. In 2011, Mary North O’Hare died, and at the time of this writing, (September 2018) the home had just been put on the market for sale.

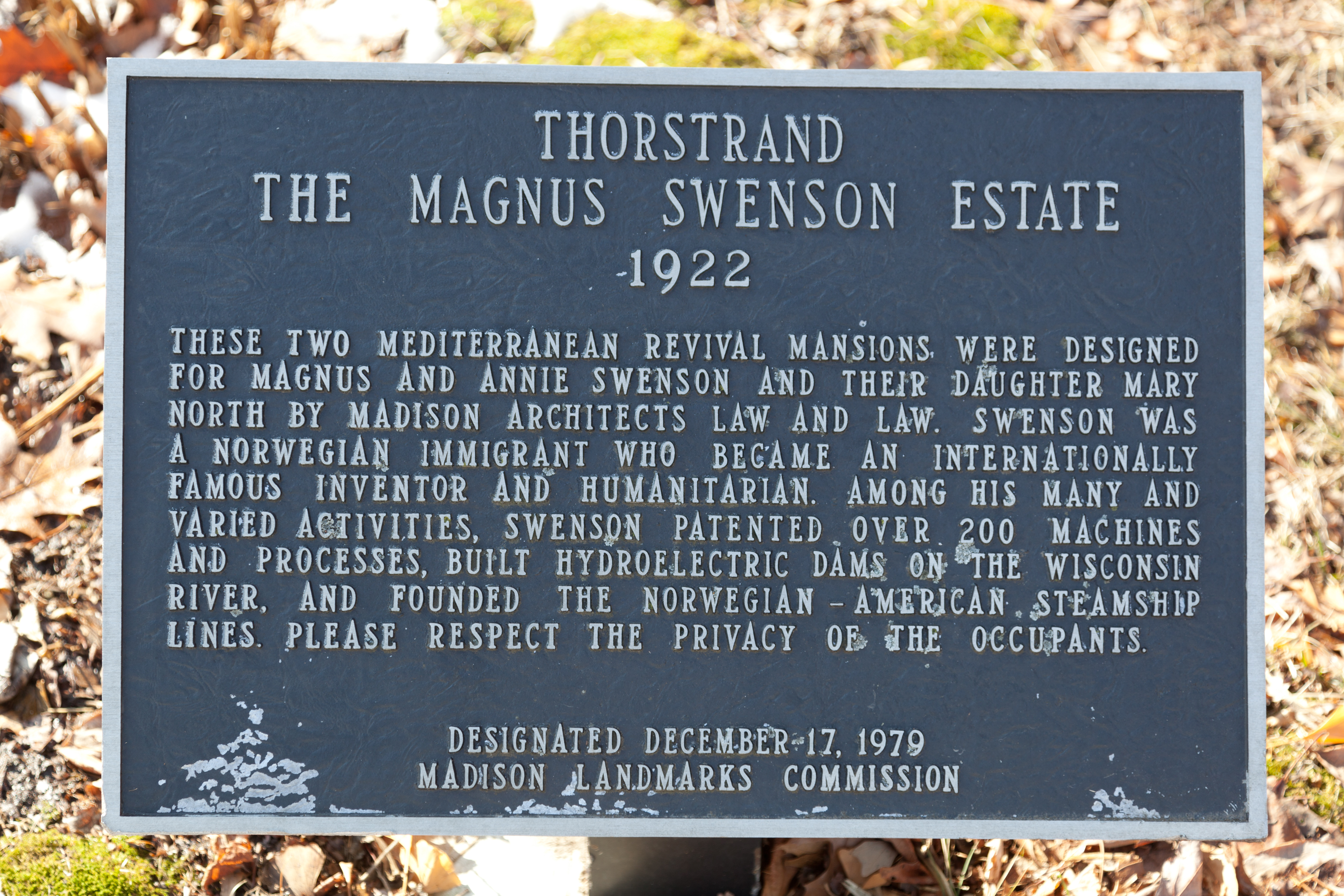
Historic Marker

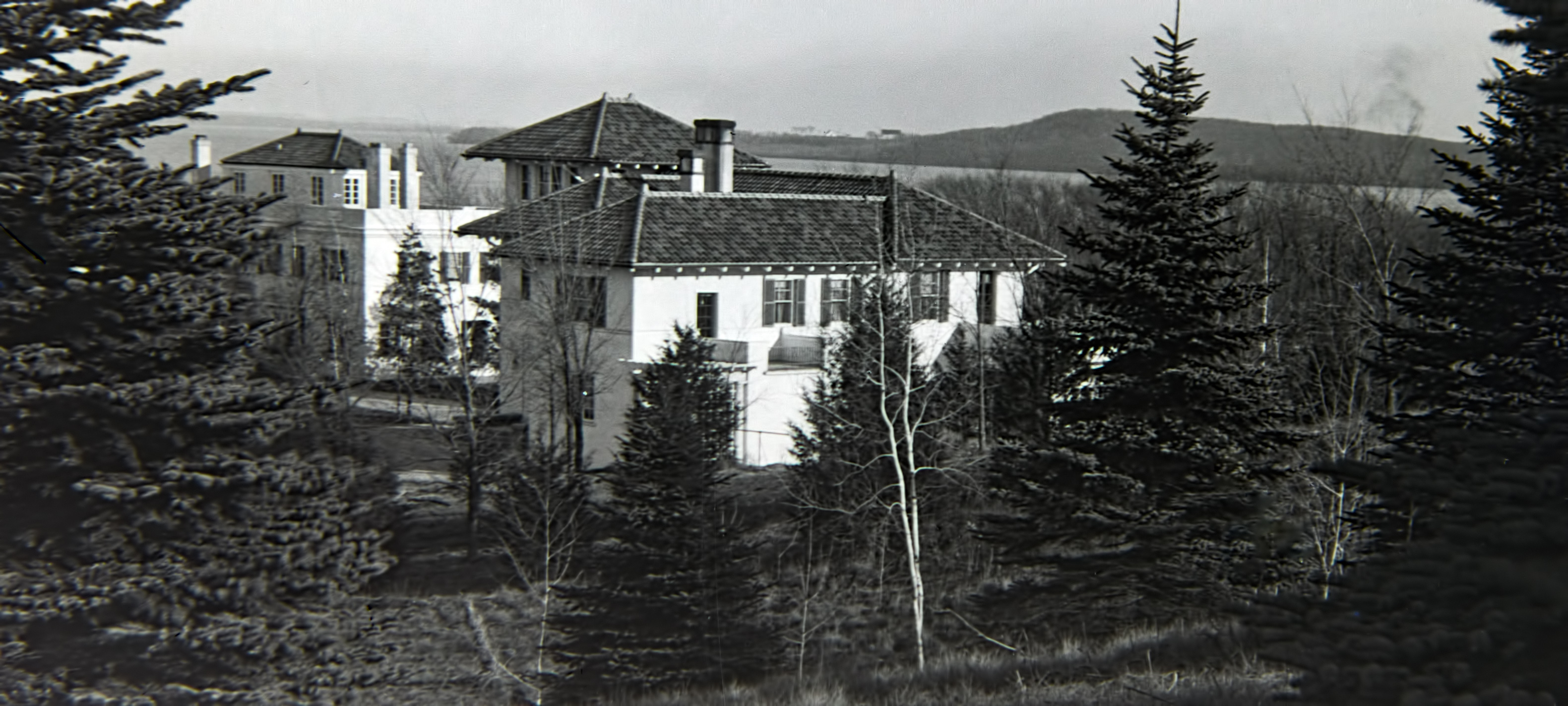
Swenson and North Homes on Lake Mendonta

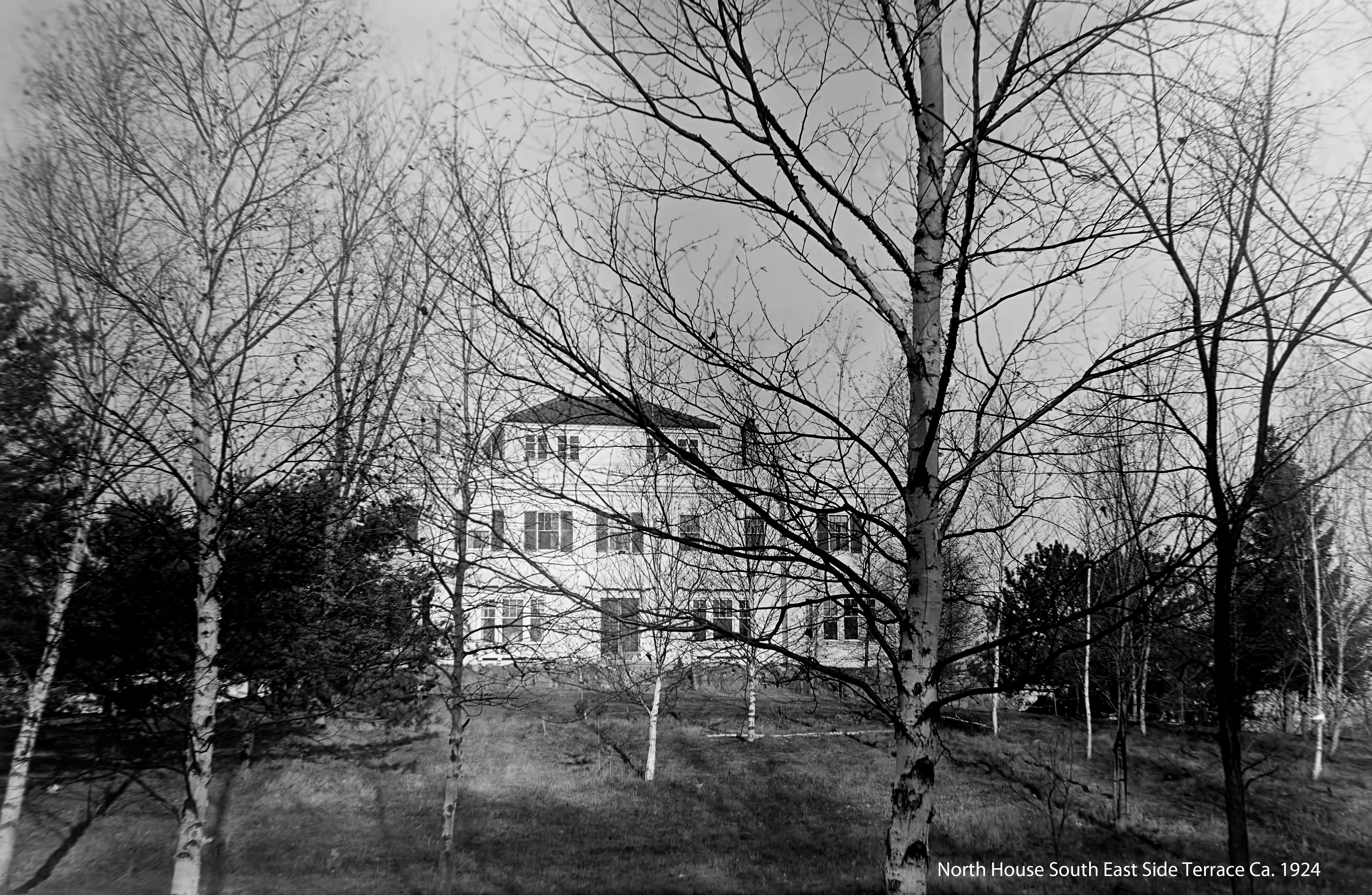
North House

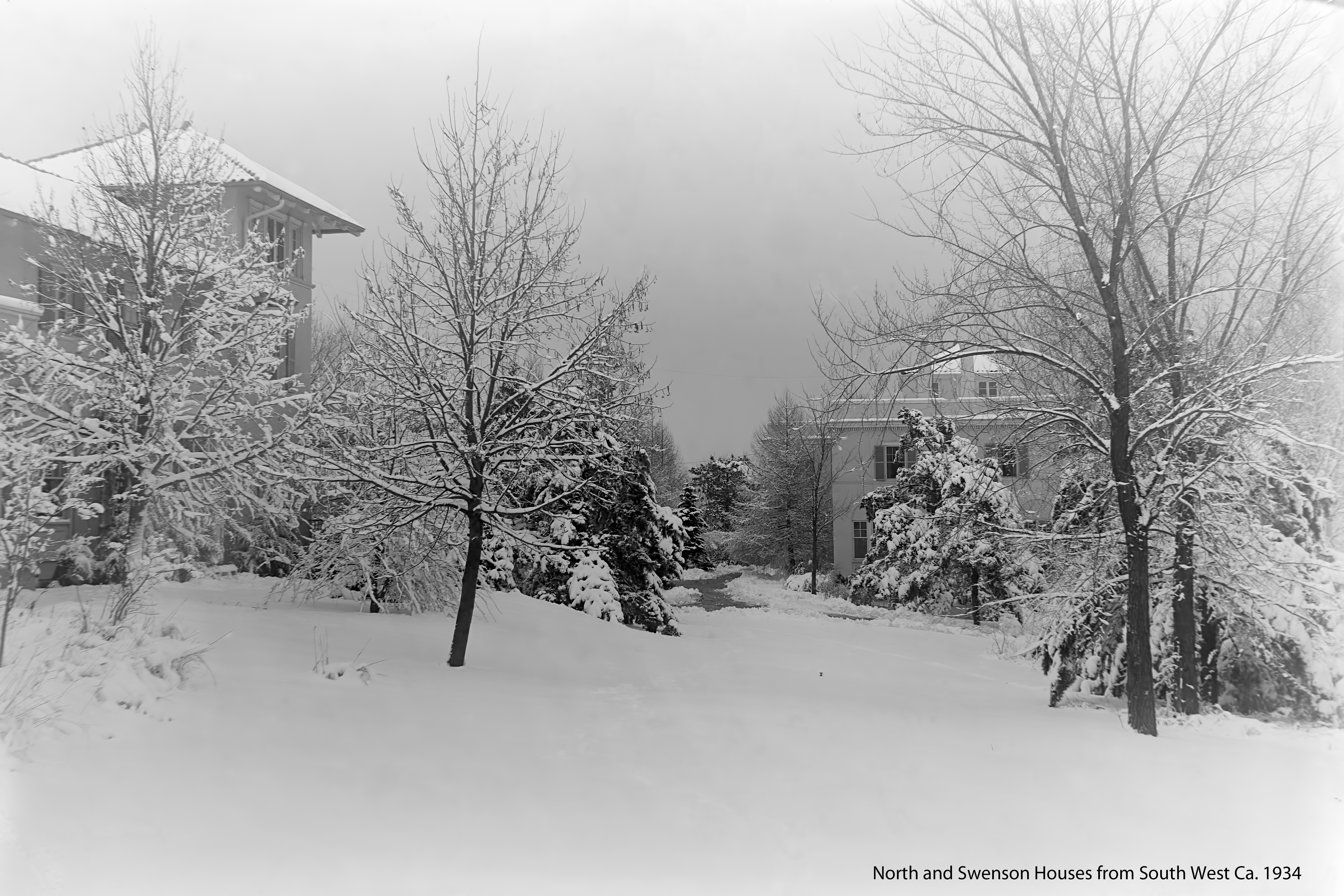
Winter scene

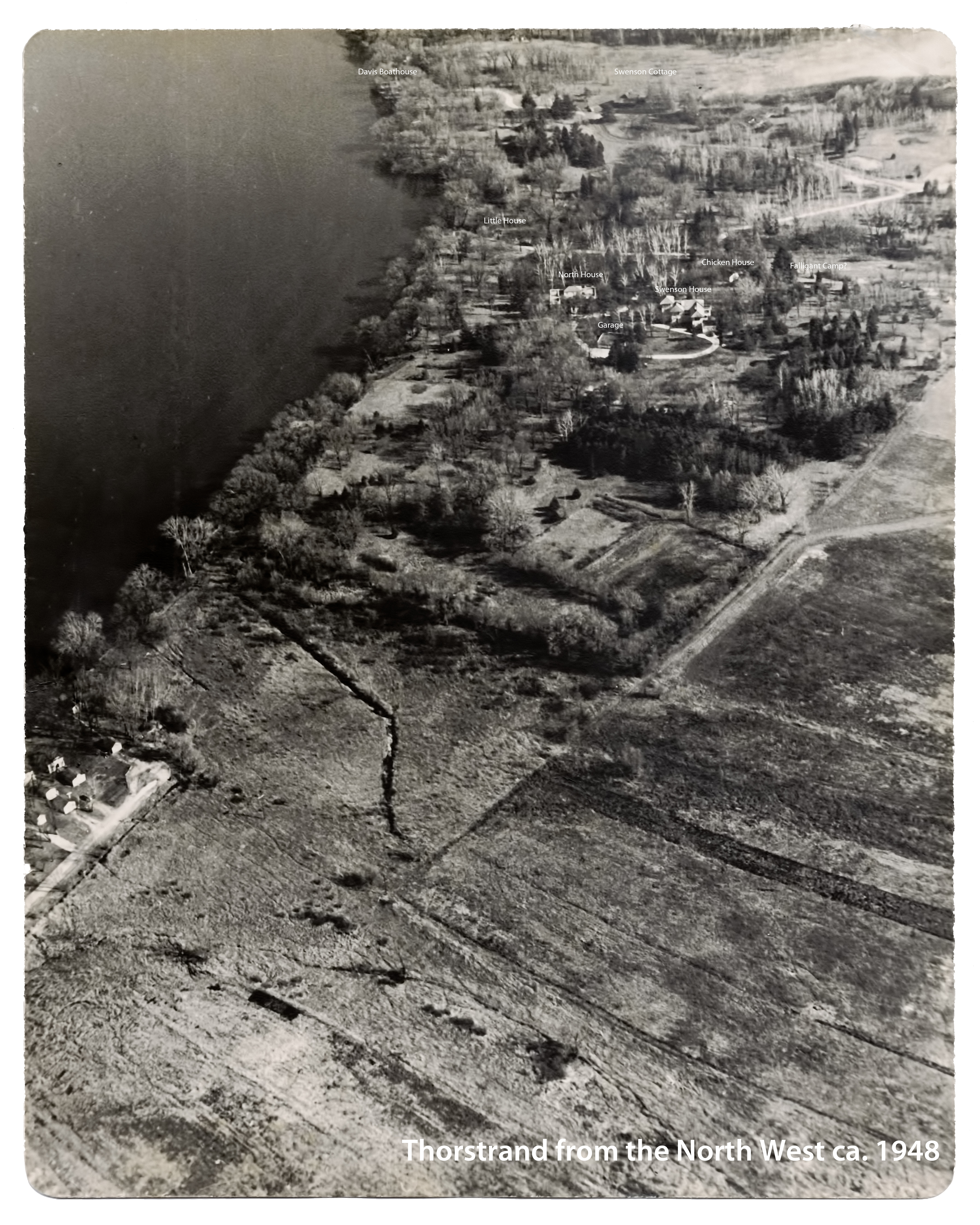
