= Frost Woods (Monona, Wisconsin) =

Historic residential area in Monona, Wisconsin

Coordinates: 43°03′20″N 89°20′06″W

Frost Woods Historic District

Frost Woods is a residential neighborhood in Monona, Wisconsin that contains many early American examples of the International Style of architecture, along with some other notable houses, including a National Register of Historic Places listed American Craftsman-style house. The area has signs of Indigenous occupation and mound construction. The Frost Woods subdivision was platted in 1929, and became the location of the first modern houses in Wisconsin by 1931. Other International Style houses were built there throughout the 1930s. The greater Frost Woods area was entered on the National Register of Historic Places in February 2026.

== Notable structures ==
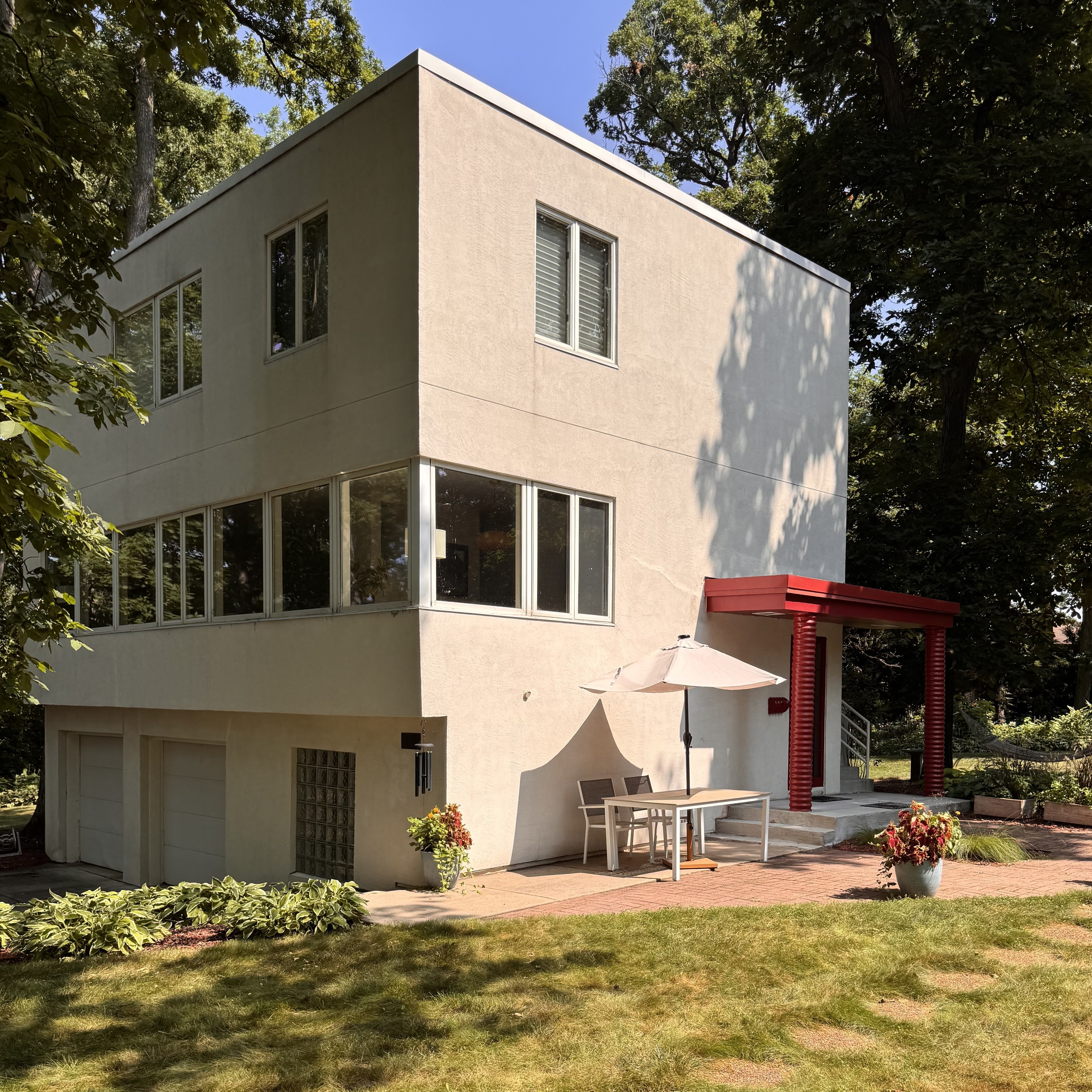
International-style Ragsdale House, built in 1937 (stucco and columns not original)

Frost Woods began as an extension of the city of Madison, Wisconsin, and is located on the southeast shore of one of the lakes that the city is built around. In 1911, Ray and Theo Owen built their Craftsman-style house at 5805 Winnequah Road, designed by James and Edward Law, of Madison. Owen was a professor at the University of Wisconsin. Some of the subsequent International Style houses were also built for University professors, including the 1932 C.W. Thomas house (5903 Winnequah) and the 1935 Paul Fulcher house (6008 Winnequah). (Note: Author and faculty member Wallace Stegner describes a UW English professor and his wife who buy land and plan a house in "Frostwood" in 1937/38 in his semi-autobiographical book Crossing to Safety (1987, p. 105).) Also notable are the 1935 Edward Thomas house (809 Owen Road), the 1936 Marcia Heath house (6106 Winnequah), and the 1937 NRHP-listed Willard and Fern Tompkins House at 110 Henuah Circle.

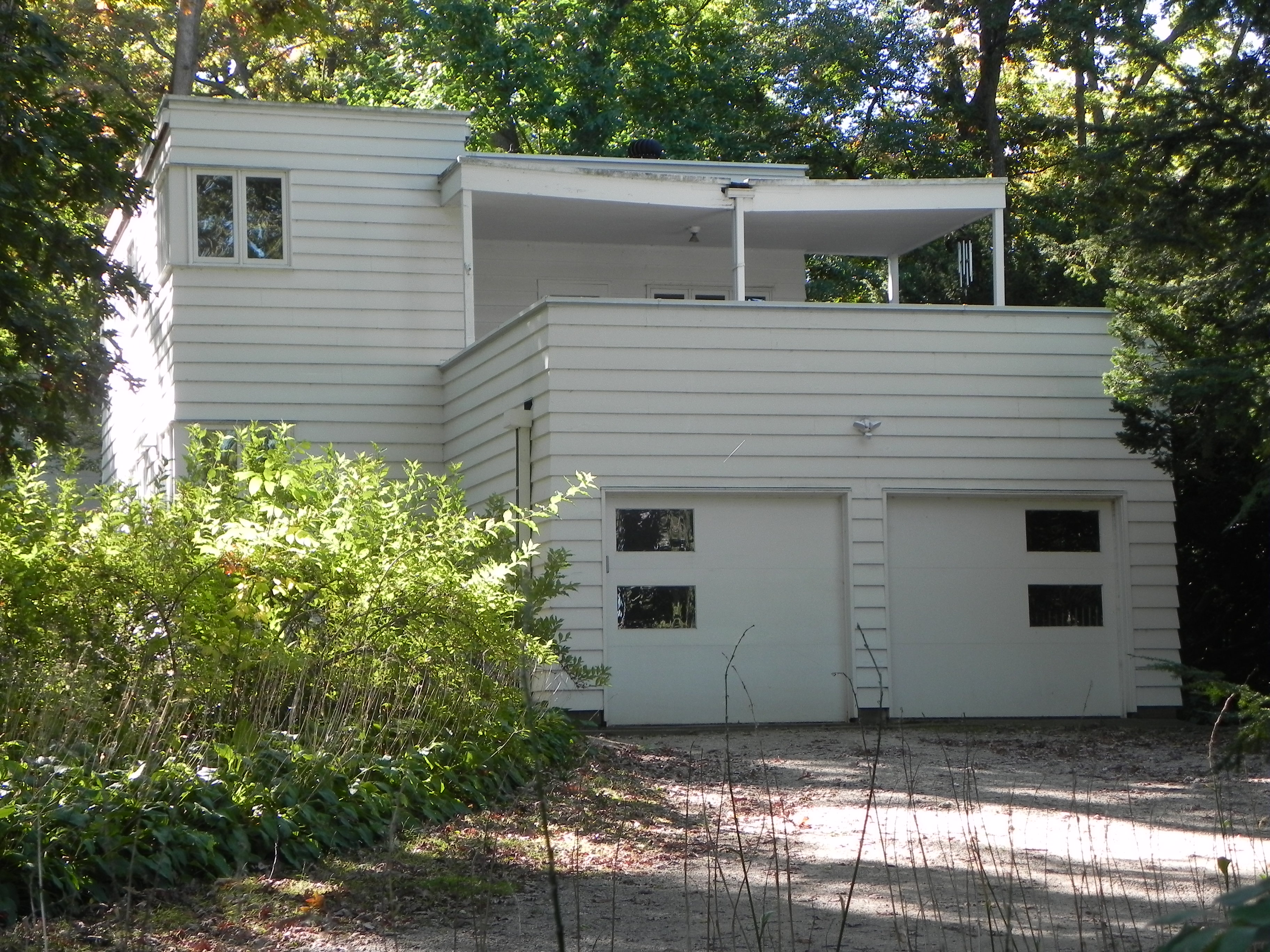
Willard and Fern Tompkins house

The Tompkins House was adjacent to and not technically part of the subdivision, but the land was sold under the conditions of the Frost Woods Homes Agreement, which "encouraged" new construction to be "in harmony" with neighboring structures. Other sites include the Robert Pooley house (6003 Winnequah) and the John Marshall house. All of the modern houses mentioned were designed by Hamilton and Gwenydd Beatty or Hamilton Beatty and Allen Strang, with a total of 12 in Frost Woods. In 1952, the Owens, Beattys, Strang, Pooley and Ednah (Mrs. C.W.) Thomas all contributed land to create the Frost Woods neighborhood park. Frost Woods became part of the Village of Monona when the latter was incorporated in 1938.

== Houses by Beatty & Beatty or Beatty & Strang ==
- Hamilton and Gwenydd Beatty house, 5907 Winnequah Road, 1931
- Charles Wright Thomas house, 5903 Winnequah Road, 1931
- Paul Fulcher house, 6008 Winnequah Road, 1935
- Edward A. Thomas house, 809 Owen Road, 1935
- Robert Pooley house, 6003 Winnequah Road, 1936
- Marcia Heath house, 6106 Winnequah Road, 1936
- Marvin Bump house, 6103 Winnequah Road, 1936 (now demolished)
- John Marshall house, 5902 Winnequah Road, 1936 (now demolished)
- Willard and Fern Tompkins house, 110 Henuah Circle, 1937
- Allen Strang house, 6106 Midwood Road, 1937 (now demolished)
- Clarence Ragsdale house, 711 Moygara Road, 1938
- Cronin-Meyer house, 5800 Winnequah Road, 1938

== Gallery ==
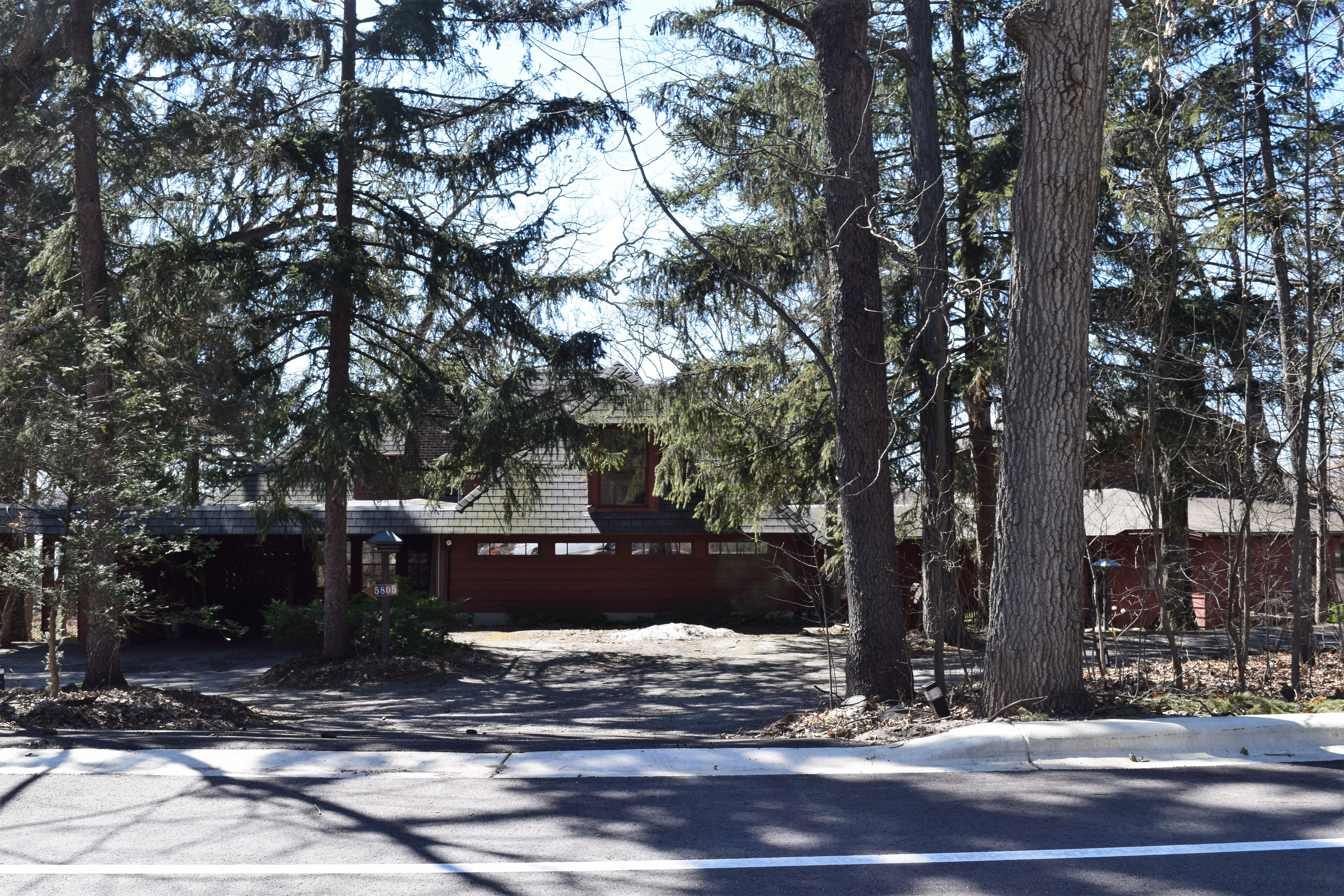
Ray and Theo Owen House

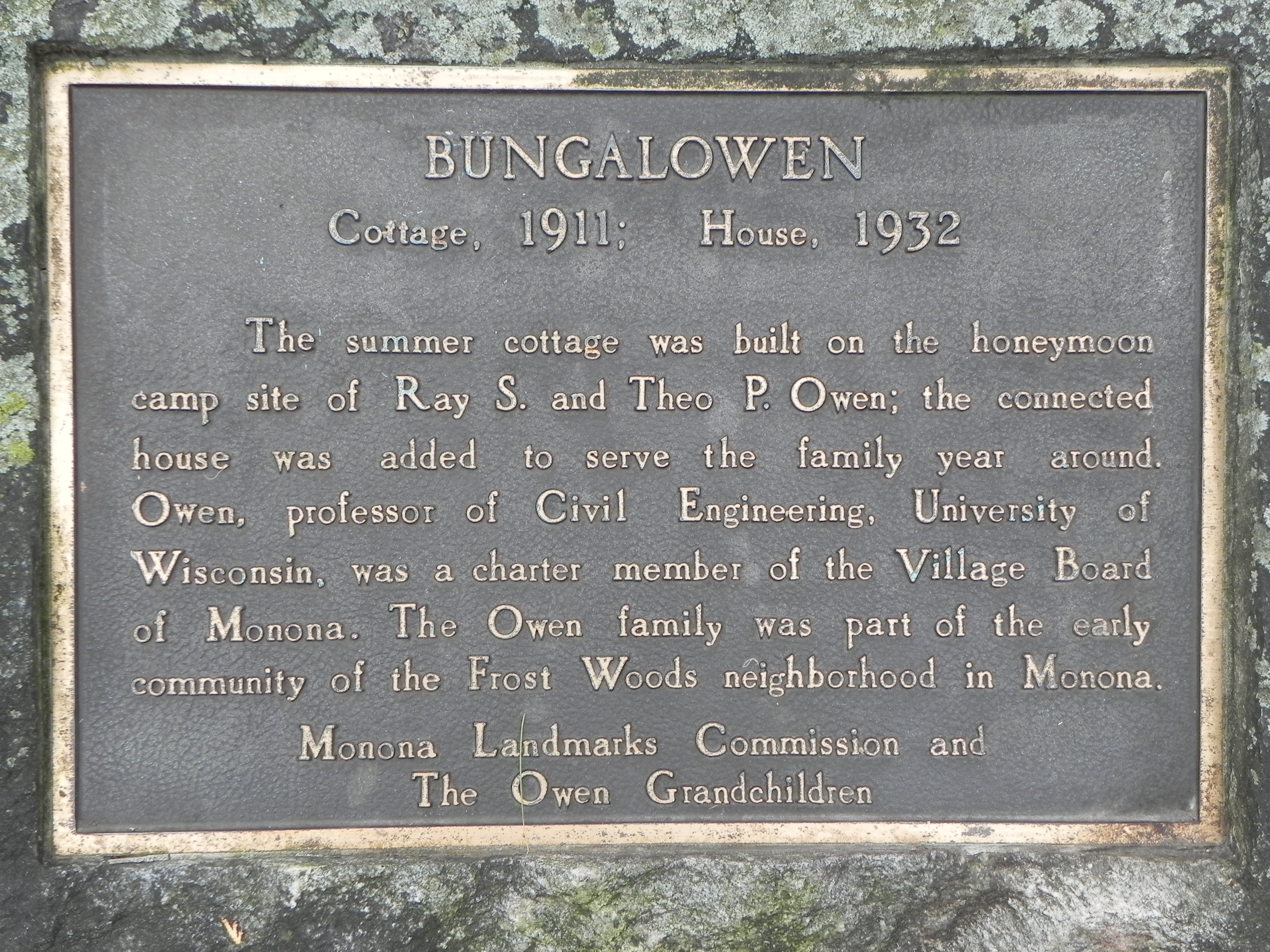
5805 Winnequah Road historic plaque

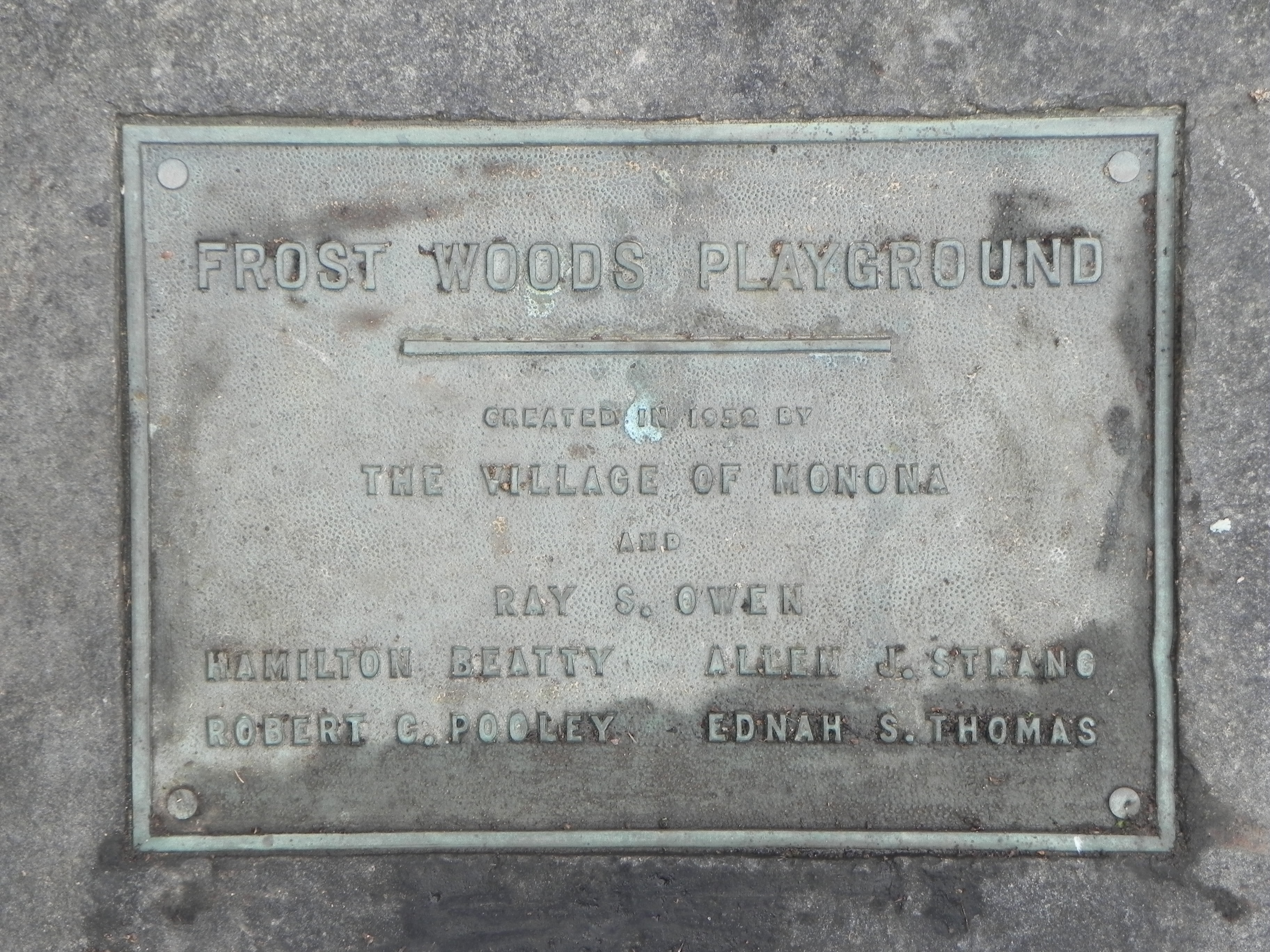
Frost Woods Park founders plaque
