= Tenney Building =

- U.S. National Register of Historic Places
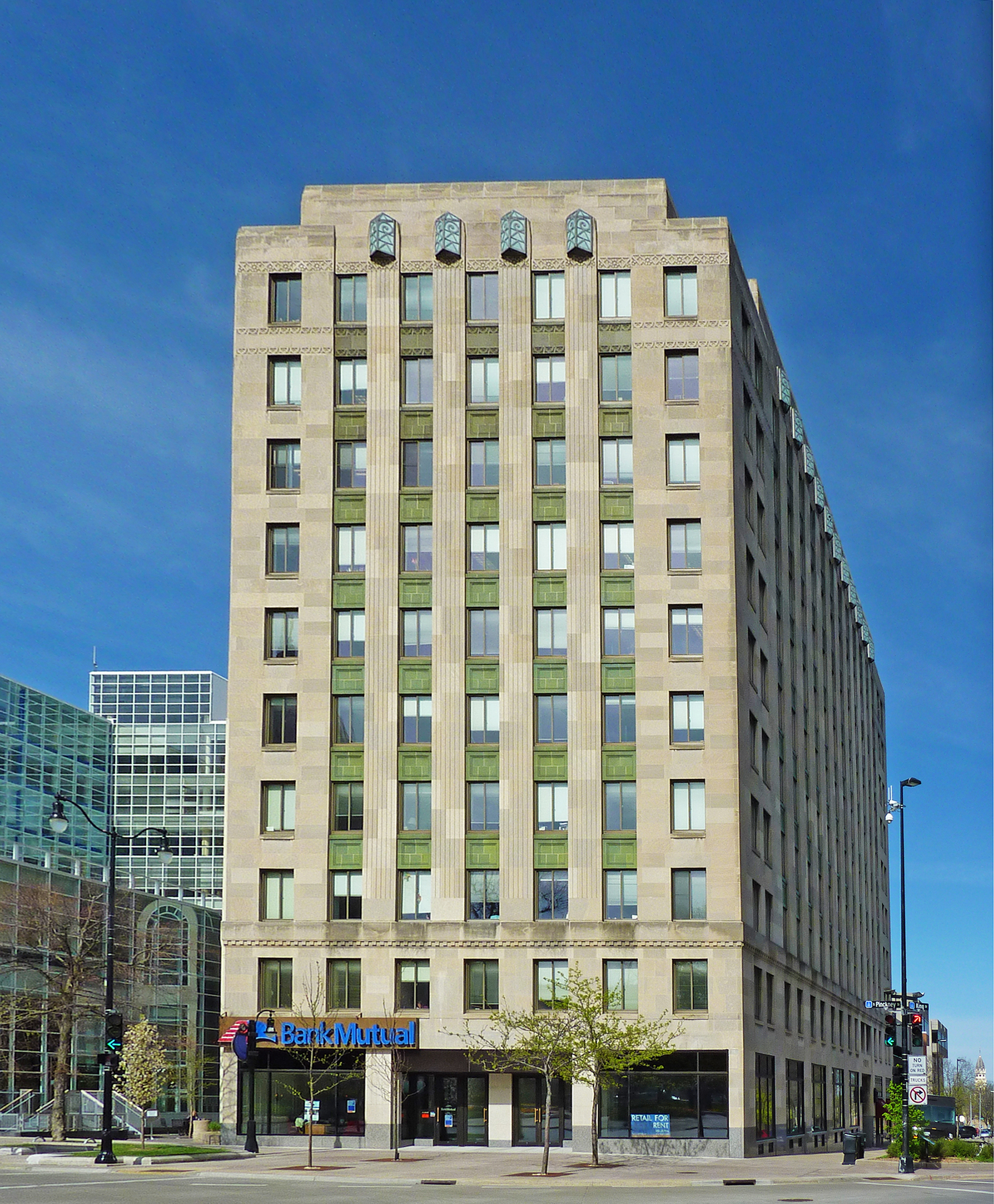
- Tenney Building

- Location within Wisconsin
- Location: 110 E. Main St. Madison, Wisconsin
- Coordinates: 43°04′30″N 89°22′54″W
- Built: 1929-1930
- Architect: Law, Law & Potter
- Architectural style: Art Deco
- NRHP reference No.: 100001775
- Added to NRHP: October 26, 2017

The Tenney Building is a historic office building at 110 E. Main Street in Madison, Wisconsin. It was built in 1929-30 and is listed on the National Register of Historic Places.

== Description ==
The ten-story building is located directly across from the Wisconsin State Capitol. The first floor houses commercial space, while the top nine stories serve as offices. The Art Deco building has a limestone exterior with a 3-foot (0.91 m) granite base. Each of the upper floors features a row of seven windows on the southwest facade; the rows are divided by green terra cotta spandrels between the five inner windows. Fluted pilasters separate the inner windows, and each is capped by a bronze light fixture. The building is topped by a limestone parapet on the southwest and southeast sides. The building's lobby includes marble walls and floors and bronze light fixtures and elevator doors.

== History ==
Lawyer Daniel K. Tenney built the Tenney Building's predecessor, the Italianate style Tenney Block, on the site of the Tenney Building in 1877. His brother Henry W. Tenney and nephew Charles Kent Tenney were also Madison lawyers, and his brother Horace was a local journalist. Charles's sons Charles Homer Tenney and William D. Tenney, a lawyer and businessman respectively, announced that they would replace the Tenney Block with a larger building in 1928. Construction on the new building began in 1929 and was completed in 1930. The architecture firm of Law, Law & Potter, the largest in Madison in the 1920s and 1930s, designed the Art Deco building. While the building was initially successful and well-occupied, the impact of the Great Depression led to the Tenney family losing the building to foreclosure in 1936; despite this, subsequent owners were able to profit from the building, and it remained a popular choice for Madison's professional offices into the 1960s. The building underwent a $6,000,000 renovation in 1985.

The Tenney Building was added to the State and the National Register of Historic Places in 2017.
