= Longfellow School (Madison, Wisconsin) =

- U.S. National Register of Historic Places
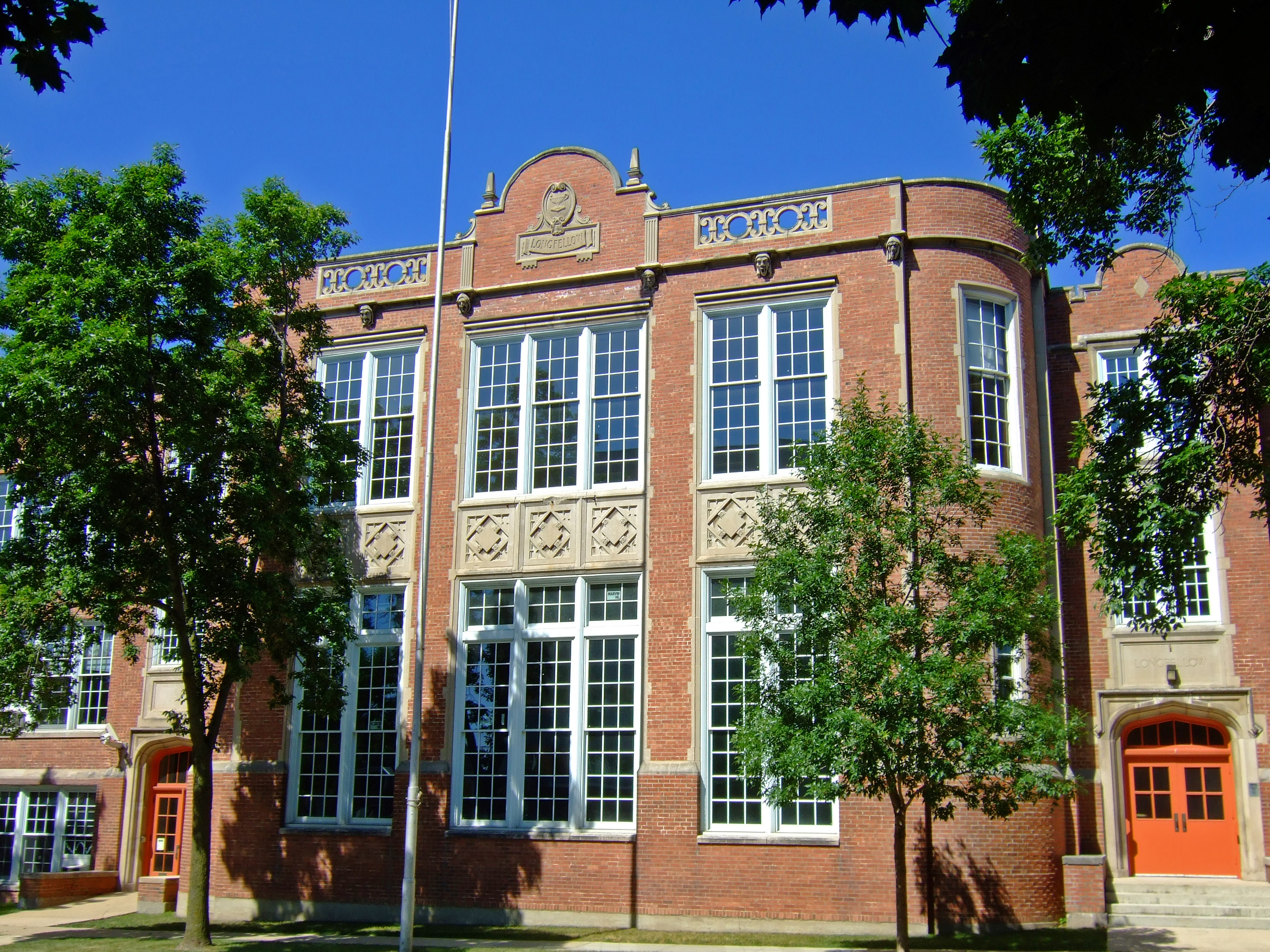

- Location within Wisconsin Location within the United States
- Location: 1010 Chandler St., Madison, Wisconsin
- Coordinates: 43°3′53″N 89°24′9″W
- Built: 1917, 1924, 1938
- Architect: James R. Law, Law, Law, and Potter
- Architectural style: Tudor Revival
- NRHP reference No.: 96000239
- Added to NRHP: March 7, 1996

Longfellow School is a two-story grade school building in the Greenbush neighborhood of Madison, Wisconsin, built in 1917 and expanded in 1924 and 1938. It ceased operation as a school in 1980. In 1996 it was listed on the National Register of Historic Places.

The Greenbush Addition to Madison was platted in 1854. The first homes were built in the southwest corner, where the land was highest. The remainder needed to be filled before houses could be built. Some areas were filled with gravel. Others were filled by dumping garbage until it surmounted the water table, then spreading dirt over the top.

Greenbush developed as a group of different ethnic communities. The early settlers were mostly German and Irish. In the 1890s many Russian Jews arrived, fleeing pogroms in Europe, settling around Mound and Park streets. Italian immigrants (mostly Sicilian) followed from 1900 to 1915 – many of them railroad workers or ditch diggers for Madison Gas Company. There were also about ten African-American families.

Madison's first public school had opened in 1838 in a log cabin, when the new community was clustered around the capitol square. Population began growing in the Bush in the 1870s, but a public school wasn't built in the neighborhood until 1892. That first Greenbush Public School was built on the southeast corner of the site occupied by the current Longfellow School. It was renamed Longfellow School around 1902. In 1909 another building was added, probably designed by Claude & Starck. This was an elementary school, and in 1911 it had 361 students. Only six years later the enrollment had increased to 700 students and the complex needed expansion again.

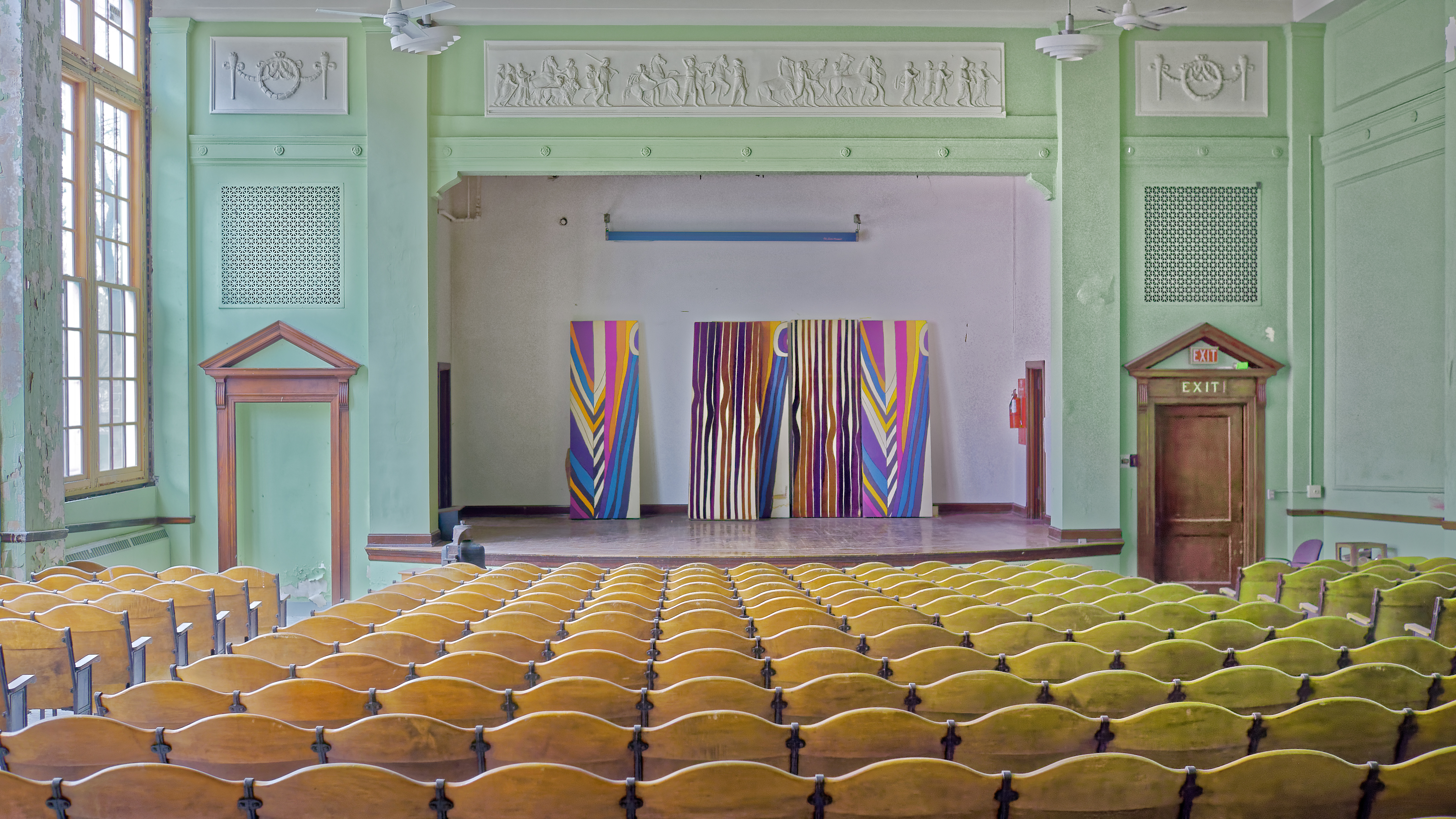
Auditorium

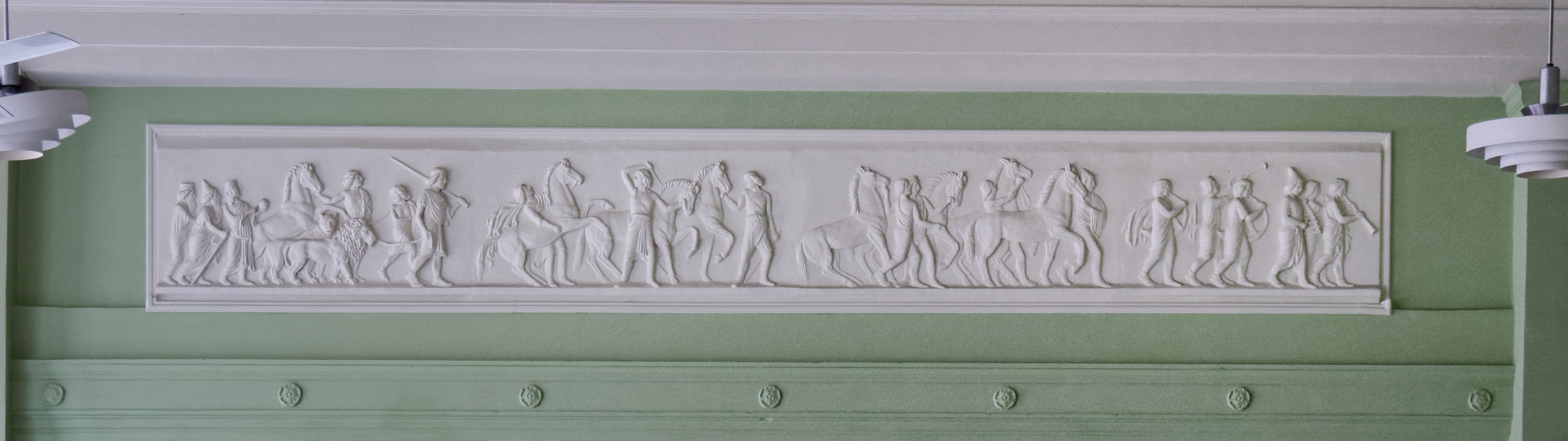
Frieze over the stage

That 1917 expansion is the north section of the current building. It was designed by James R. Law with a gym in the basement and classrooms above. A matching section with a 2-story auditorium and lunch room was added in 1924, designed by James and Edward Law. In 1938 the 1892 building was torn down and replaced by a section with a larger gymnasium, library and music room designed by the Laws and Ellis Potter and built as a Public Works Administration project. In 1940, the 1909 building was torn down, leaving the structure that stands today. It has a reverse L-shaped footprint and is about 275 feet (84 m) wide in its main facade, running north–south, and about 60 feet (18 m) on the north end and 105 feet (32 m) deep on the south end. It is built of load-bearing red brick walls in running stretcher bond in the original 1917 section, and with structural clay tile with brick veneer in the 1924 and 1938 sections.

The building's architecture is of the rare Elizabethan-Jacobean Revival subtype of Tudor Revival architecture. Elements of this style are the shaped parapets, the Tudor-arched doorways, the tabs around some of the doorways and trim, and the designs in the north section. In that section, six grotesque faces looked down on the students from the bottom of the parapet.

Attendance at Longfellow hit a second peak around 475 in the 1940s and 1950s. In the 1960s attendance began to drop, partly due to an urban renewal program that razed and rebuilt 52 acres of Greenbush. Starting in 1972 some of the space was taken up by an alternative high school in the north end of the building. Use as a public school stopped in 1980. Since then, the building has mostly been used by Meriter Hospital.

Longfellow School was added to the NRHP in 1996 as a good local example of the unusual Elizabethan-Jacobean type of Tudor Revival architecture, and as a good representative of the evolution of elementary education in the U.S., starting as classrooms, and gradually adding auditorium, gym, library and other areas.
