= Law, Law & Potter =

American architect

Law, Law & Potter was an architecture firm in Madison, Wisconsin; Potter Lawson, Inc. is its modern-day successor. Some of its buildings are listed on the U.S. National Register of Historic Places for their architecture. The firm was Madison's largest and "arguably most important" architectural firm in the 1920s and 1930s.

The founding partners were brothers James R. Law III (1885–1952) and Edward J. Law (1891–1983), who were both born in Madison and graduates of the University of Pennsylvania's School of Architecture. Ellis J. Potter (1890 – 1990) joined them in 1926. Paul E. Nystrom (1899–?) joined as a draftsman and was an architect in the firm by 1931, and the firm eventually became Law, Law, Potter, & Nystrom.

James R. Law (1855–1952) was born in Madison. He worked in the architectural office of Louis Claude and Edward Starck in 1901, and later studied at the School of Architecture of the University of Pennsylvania, and graduated in 1909. Then back in Madison, he worked for architect Arthur Peabody before founding his own firm in 1914.

== Works Include ==
- Ray S. and Theo P. Owen summer cottage, (1911) 5805 Winnequah Rd, Monona (Law & Law) NRHP-listed

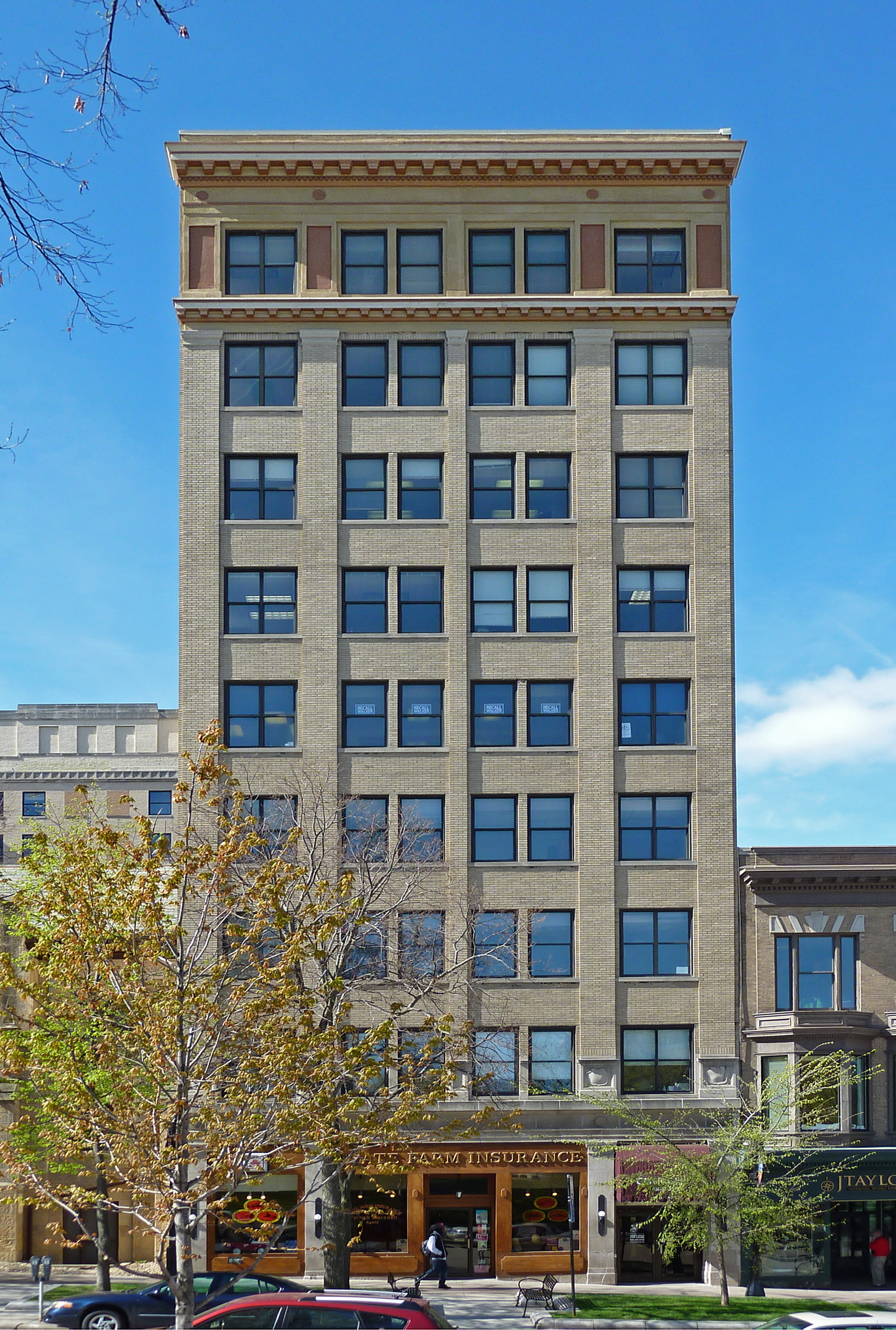
Gay/Churchill building, 1913–15, James R. Law. Madison's first skyscraper.

- Gay Building 14-16 N Carroll St., Madison, 1913 to 1915, (Law & Law), NRHP-listed

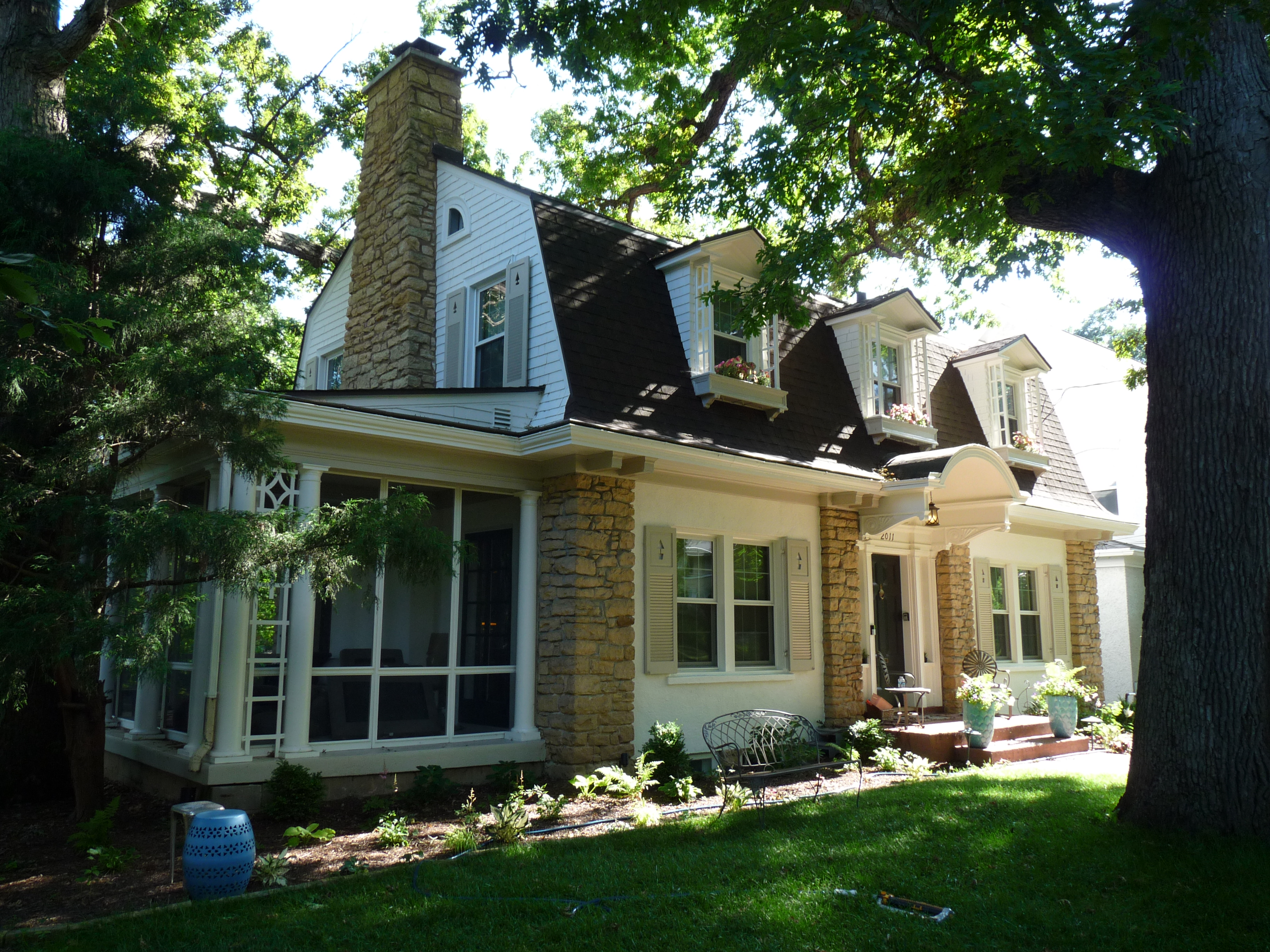
James Law's first house on Van Hise, 1915, Dutch Colonial Revival style

- James R. Law house, 2011 Van Hise Ave., Madison, 1915, contributing property to University Heights Historic District
- Beavers Insurance building, 119 Martin Luther King Jr. Blvd., Madison (Law & Law)
- Bank of Madison building, 1 West Main St., Madison (Law & Law)
- First National Bank building, 1 North Pinckney St., Madison (demolished) (Law & Law)

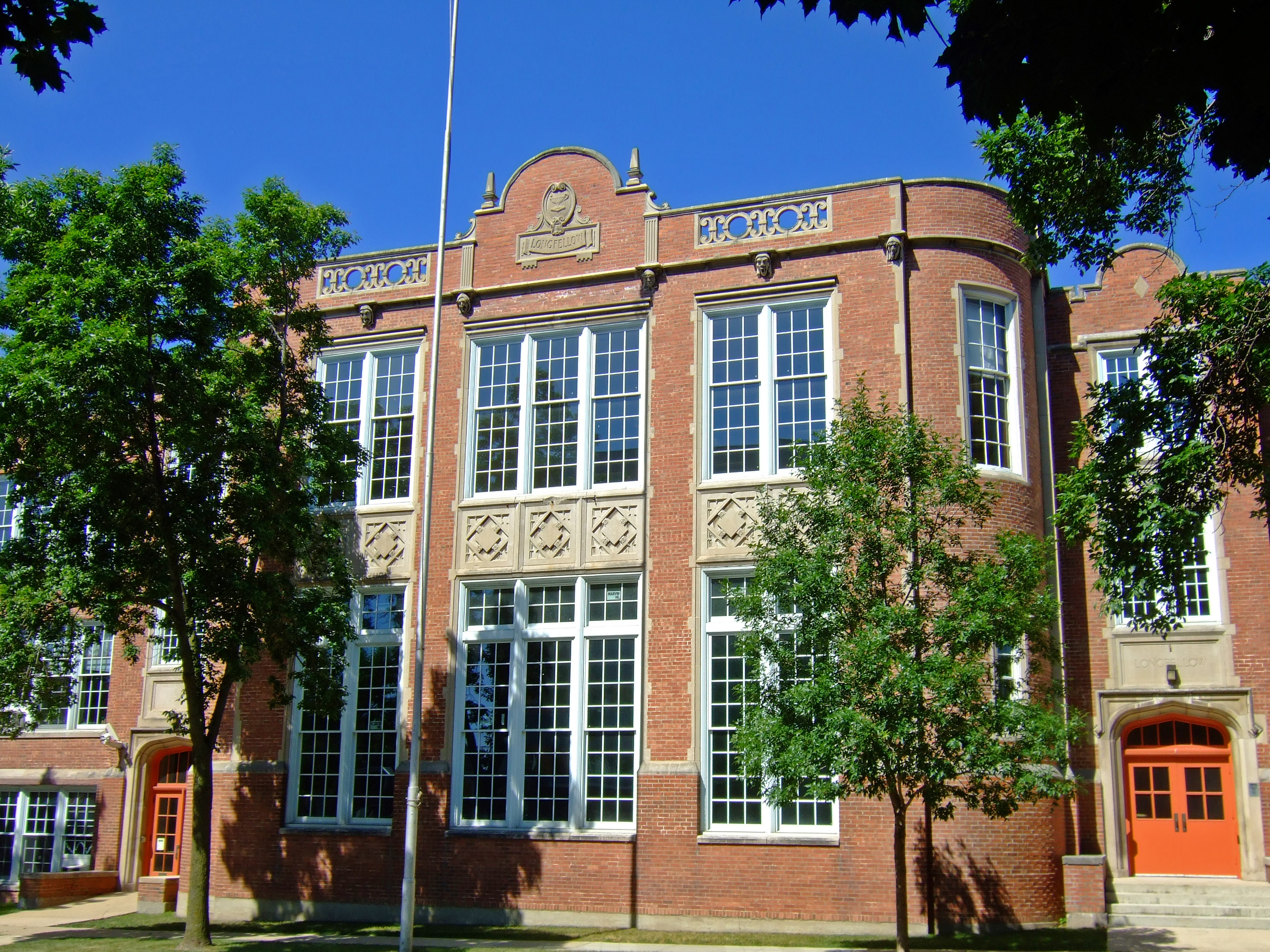
Longfellow School, 1917

- Longfellow School (1917 with additions in 1924 & 1938) 1010 Chandler St, Madison, NRHP-listed.
- Madison Masonic Temple (1915 and 1922 designs; built 1923–25), 301 Wisconsin Ave., Madison, (Law & Law), NRHP-listed
- Thorstrand, (1922) 1-2 Thorstrand Rd., Madison, NRHP-listed (Law & Law).
- Italian Workmen's Club, (1922) 914 Regent Street, Madison, (Law, Law & Potter) NRHP-listed.
- Alpha Xi Delta sorority house (1923) 12 Langdon St, Madison (Law, Law & Potter), contributing to Langdon Street Historic District.
- Acacia fraternity house (1924) 108 Langdon St, Madison (Law & Law), contributing to Langdon Street Historic District.

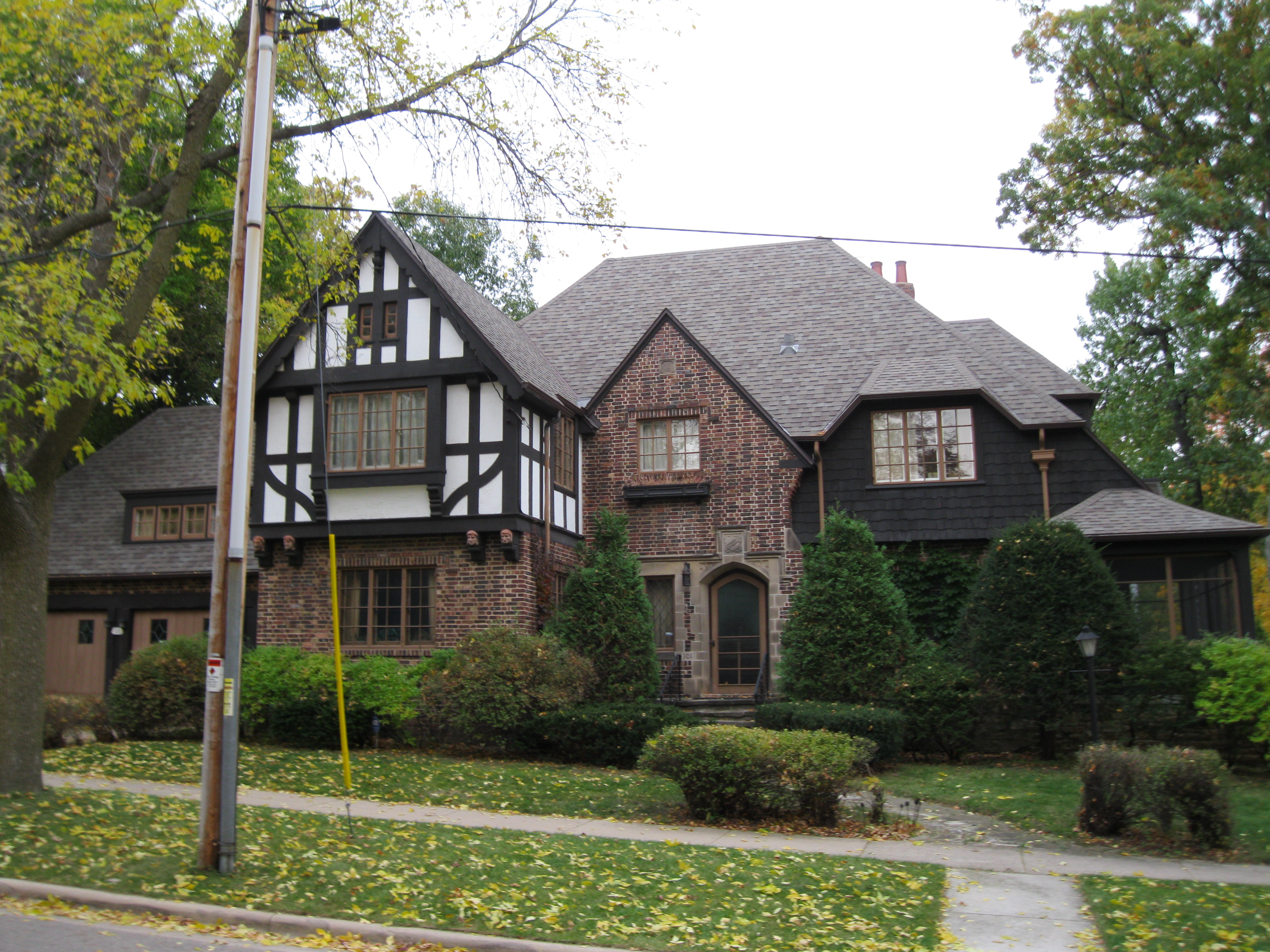
James Law's 2nd house on Prospect Ave, 1925 Tudor Revival style

- James Law house, (1925) 101 Prospect Ave, Madison (Law & Law), contributing to University Heights Historic District.
- Beta Theta Pi fraternity house (1925) 622 Mendota Ct, Madison (Law & Law), contributing to Langdon Street Historic District.
- a 1925 house in College Hills Historic District (Law, Law & Potter).
- Kappa Alpha Theta sorority house (1926) 237 Lakelawn Place (Law, Law & Potter), contributing to Langdon Street Historic District.

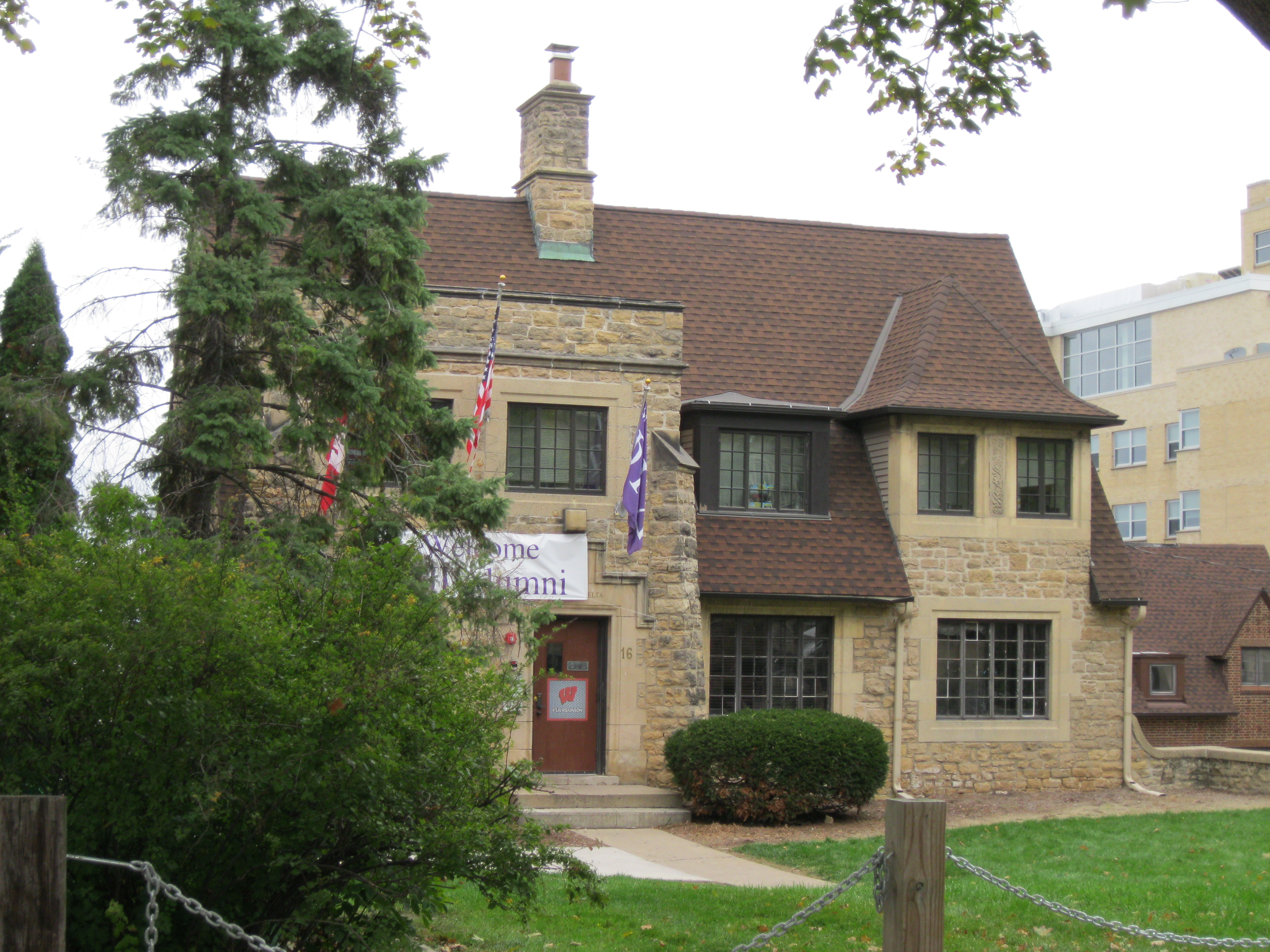
Phi Gamma Delta house, 1926, Tudor Revival

- Phi Gamma Delta fraternity house (1926) 16 Langdon St, Madison (Law, Law & Potter), contributing to Langdon Street Historic District.
- Theta Chi fraternity house (1926) 144 Langdon St, Madison (Law, Law & Potter), contributing to Langdon Street Historic District.
- Chi Phi fraternity house (1928) 610 N Henry St, Madison (Law, Law & Potter), contributing to Langdon Street Historic District.
- Alpha Omicron Pi sorority (1928) 636 Langdon St, Madison (Law, Law & Potter) French Provincial style, contributing to Langdon Street Historic District.
- Roosevelt Elementary School (1929), 316 South Ringold Street, Janesville, WI (Law, Law & Potter), NRHP-listed.
- Tenney Building (1929–1930), 110 E. Main St., Madison, NRHP-listed
- Six homes in the Shorewood Historic District in Shorewood Hills, built from 1926 to 1931: Gifford, Horner, O'Malley, Ross, Beckwith & Potter.
- Adams Elementary School (1939), 1138 East Memorial Drive, Janesville, WI (Law, Law & Potter), NRHP-listed.
- Washington Elementary School (1939), 811 North Pine Street, Janesville, WI (Law, Law & Potter), NRHP-listed.
- Mount Horeb Public School (1941 addition), 207 Academy St Mount Horeb, WI (Law, Law & Porter), NRHP-listed
- Madison Vocational School (1949–1950 and 1964 additions) 211 N. Carroll St., Madison (Law, Law, Potter, & Nystrom), NRHP-listed
- West Side School, 718 W. Phillip St. Rhinelander, WI (Law, Law and Potter), NRHP-listed
- Lake View Sanatorium, 1204 Northport Dr., Madison (Law, Law, & Potter), NRHP-listed
- Wiedenbeck-Dobelin Warehouse, Madison, NRHP-listed (Law & Law)
- Wisconsin Power and Light Building, Madison
- First Congregational Church, Madison
- Madison General Hospital (two wings), Madison
- West High School, Madison
- Marquette Elementary School, Madison
- Shorewood Elementary School, Madison
- Filene House, Madison <https://www.madisonpreservation.org/blog/2020/2/29/cuna-mutual-at-home-in-madison>
- Janesville Women's Club Association, Janesville, (Law, Law & Potter)
- The 1928 Tudor Revival-styled George Fifield house in the NRHP-listed Jefferson Avenue Historic District, bounded by Oakland, Garfield and Ruger Aves. and Forest Park Blvd. Janesville, WI (Law, Law and Potter).
- One or more works in NRHP-listed Nakoma Historic District, Roughly bounded by Odana Rd., Manitou Wy., Mohawk Dr., and Whenona Dr. Madison, WI (Law, Law, and Potter)
- One or more works in NRHP-listed West Lawn Heights Historic District, Roughly bounded by Virginia Ter., Regent St., S. Spooner Ave., and Illinois Central Railroad Madison, WI (Law, Law and Potter)
