= Mount Horeb Public School =

- U.S. National Register of Historic Places
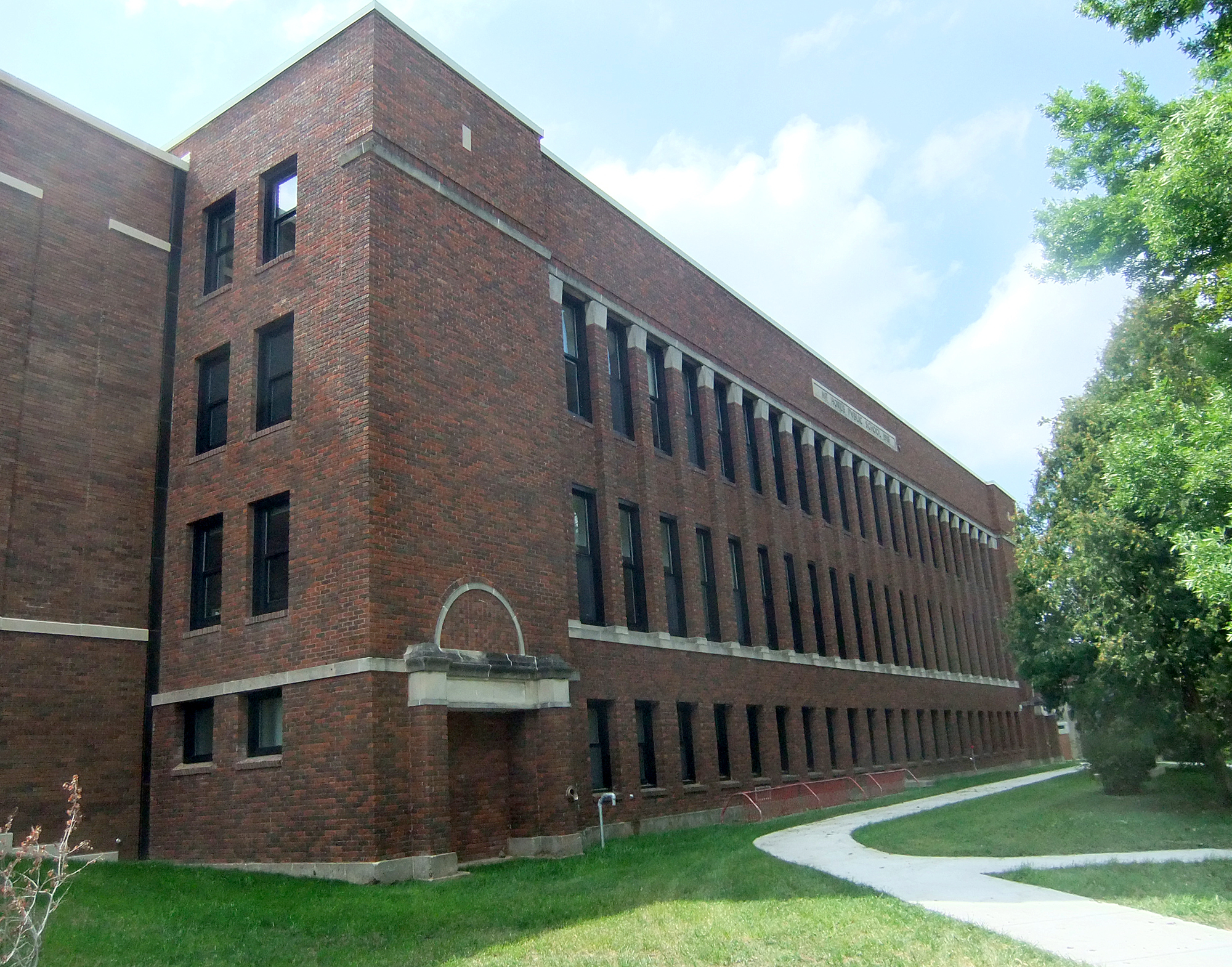
- Location: 207 Academy St. Mount Horeb, Wisconsin
- Built: 1918; 1941
- Architect: Claude and Starck; Law, Law & Potter
- Architectural style: Prairie School
- NRHP reference No.: 10000298
- Added to NRHP: May 28, 2010

Mount Horeb Public School is located in Mount Horeb, Wisconsin. It was added to the National Register of Historic Places in 2010.

== History ==
The school was built to educate elementary and high school students in Mount Horeb. In 1941, the building was expanded. Currently, first and second grade students are educated there.

The original and largest part of the school was designed in 1918 by Madison architects Claude & Starck. This portion is three stories, in Prairie School style and 150 feet (46 m) by 80 feet (24 m) on a poured concrete basement foundation. The school was expanded in 1941 by a 95 feet (29 m) by 85 feet (26 m) gymnasium/auditorium and a 50 feet (15 m) by 60 feet (18 m) "hyphen" that joined it to the original school. These were designed by Madison architects Law, Law, and Potter.
