= Hyer's Hotel =

- U.S. National Register of Historic Places
- U.S. Historic district – Contributing property
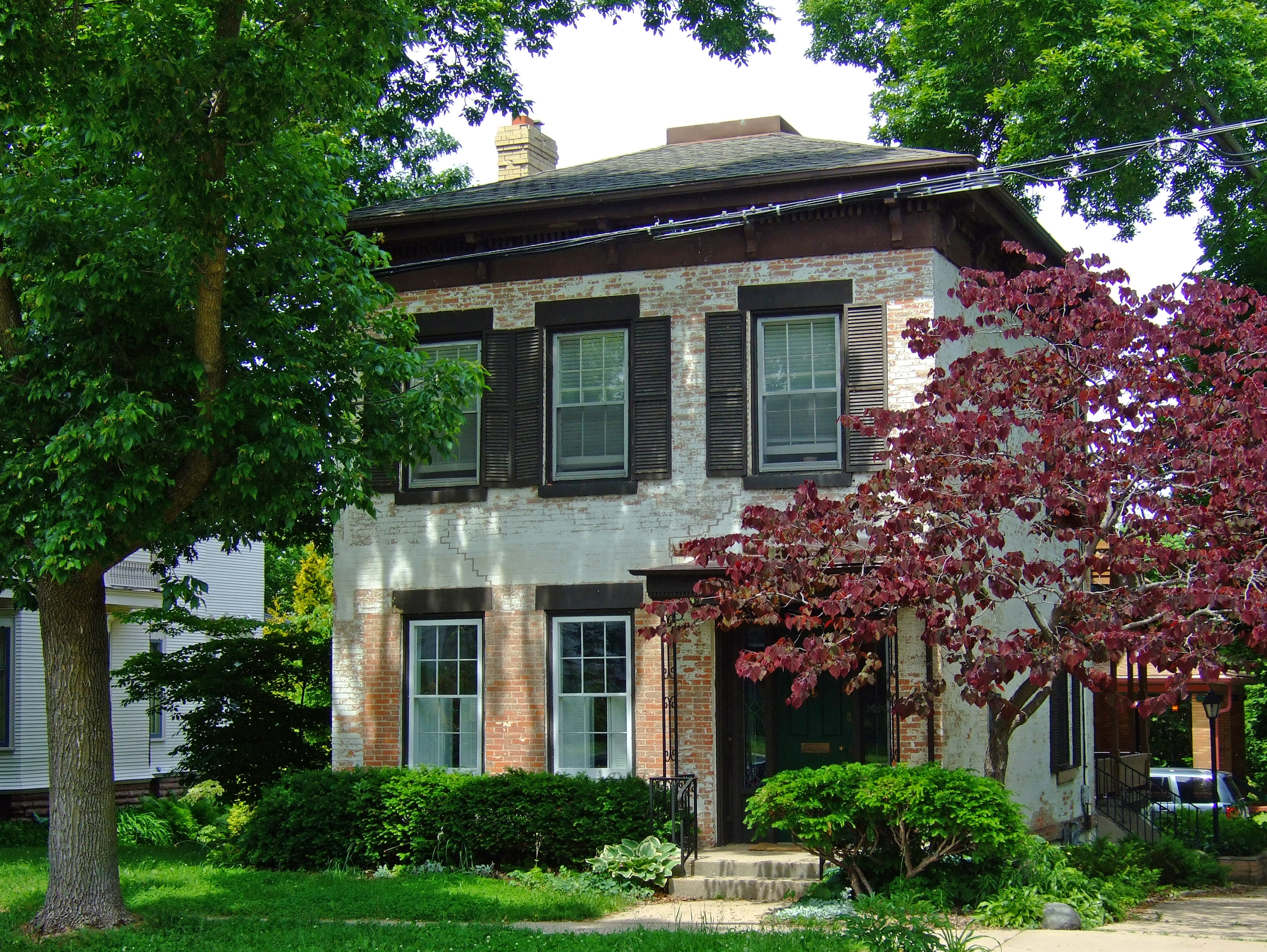
- Hyer's Hotel, June 2009
- Location: 854 Jenifer Street; Madison, Wisconsin; United States
- Coordinates: 43.07887°N 89.36915°W
- Built: 1854
- Architectural style: Italianate
- Part of: Jenifer-Spaight Historic District (ID04001153)
- NRHP reference No.: 83003370

Significant dates
- Added to NRHP: September 22, 1983
- Designated CP: October 13, 2004

Hyer's Hotel is the oldest surviving urban hotel building in Madison, Wisconsin. Built in 1854 a half mile east of the capitol, it was added in 1983 to the National Register of Historic Places.

== History ==
David R. Hyer came to Madison in 1837 - one of the new community's first white settlers. He came to work on the first capitol building. He stayed with the Pecks (the first white settlers) for a bit, then built a house near the capitol which he ran as a boarding house. David and his wife Anna are listed as the first benefactors of Grace Episcopal parish. Anna died in 1843. David moved east of Madison to Deerfield and operated a hotel-tavern there for some years, then came back to Madison in 1854 to build the hotel pictured above.

Madison's earliest building took place around the capitol, but by the 1850s development was spreading out to the nearby high ground, including the ridge along Lake Monona where "construction on the near east side and in the city as a whole proceeded at a frantic pace. The immigrant carpenters, cabinet makers, stone cutters and masons, tinners, and blacksmiths supplied the skills and labor in the construction of several public buildings, commercial blocks, and hundreds of residences ranging from modest rental dwellings to palatial stone mansions." A commercial district developed along Williamson St., a block over from Hyer's Hotel on Jenifer St.

Hyer's hotel was built two stories tall, with walls of inexpensive red brick standing on a foundation of sandstone rubble, sheltered under a hip roof. The clay for the brick is said to have come from a block away on the shore of Lake Monona - now the site of B.B. Clarke Park. The walls are three bricks thick, with six chimney flues built right into the brick walls. The windows and doors have plain sills and lintels typical of Greek Revival style. The wooden cornice below the eaves has a frieze board and brackets typical of Italianate style. The original hotel also had a wooden wing reaching down Paterson Street, with a stable behind. Inside the hotel are plaster ceiling medallions in some rooms. Also, some of the fine woodwork may be original: the stairway with a turned newel post and the Greek Revival-style architraves above some doors and windows may have been built by Hyer himself.

Henry Jaquish bought the hotel from David and his new wife Eliza in 1855 for $9,000 and ran it for almost 20 years. The hotel primarily served laborers, farmers and ordinary travelers. In 1858 Jaquish advertised room and board for 50 cents a day or $3 per week. He also offered drinks in his saloon, horse-shoeing at his stable, and that he himself could pull teeth. During the Civil War, Jaquish recruited for the 23rd Wisconsin Infantry Regiment. The hotel also hosted soldiers and families on their way to the Soldiers' Orphans Home a block away.

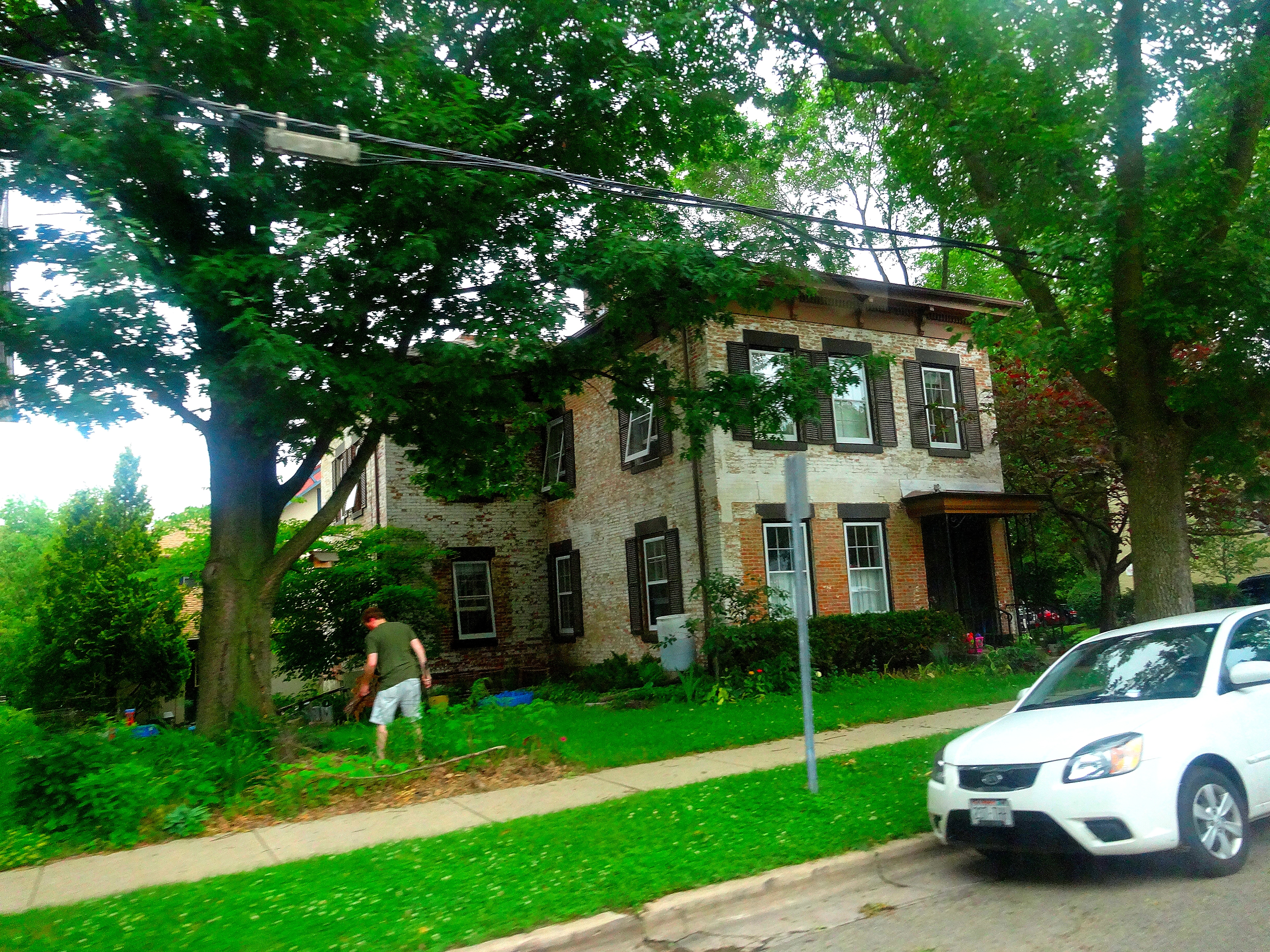
Hyer's Hotel, June 2014

In 1874 the hotel caught fire. The wooden wing and the stable were destroyed, but the brick section survived. Afterwards Jaquish enlarged the brick section, but it never served as a hotel again. Jaquish used it as his home, as did Adolph Green later, and Joseph Kleiner after.

In 1910 Arthur Schulkamp bought the house. Schulkamp had cofounded an insurance company in 1906, served in and founded several banks, and presided over the Wisconsin Insurance Board. He was also a philanthropist, donating to many local causes. Around 1915 the Schulkamps removed some walls to merge some hotel rooms and added a library and dining room, and upgraded the flooring and lighting fixtures. In the 1970s they added the front porch, aiming to approximate the original porch.

In 1975 the hotel was designated a landmark by the Madison Landmarks Commission. Additionally, it is listed on the Wisconsin State Register of Historic Places and the National Register of Historic Places in 1983 - for being the oldest surviving hotel building in Madison, for being one of the few surviving buildings made with the soft red brick made from the clay of Lake Monona, and for the fine interior details that survive in the front of the building. Now the hotel also lies within the Jenifer-Spaight Historic District.

== See also ==
- National Register of Historic Places listings in Madison, Wisconsin
