= Jenifer-Spaight Historic District =

Historic district in Wisconsin, United States

- Jenifer--Spaight Historic District
- U.S. National Register of Historic Places
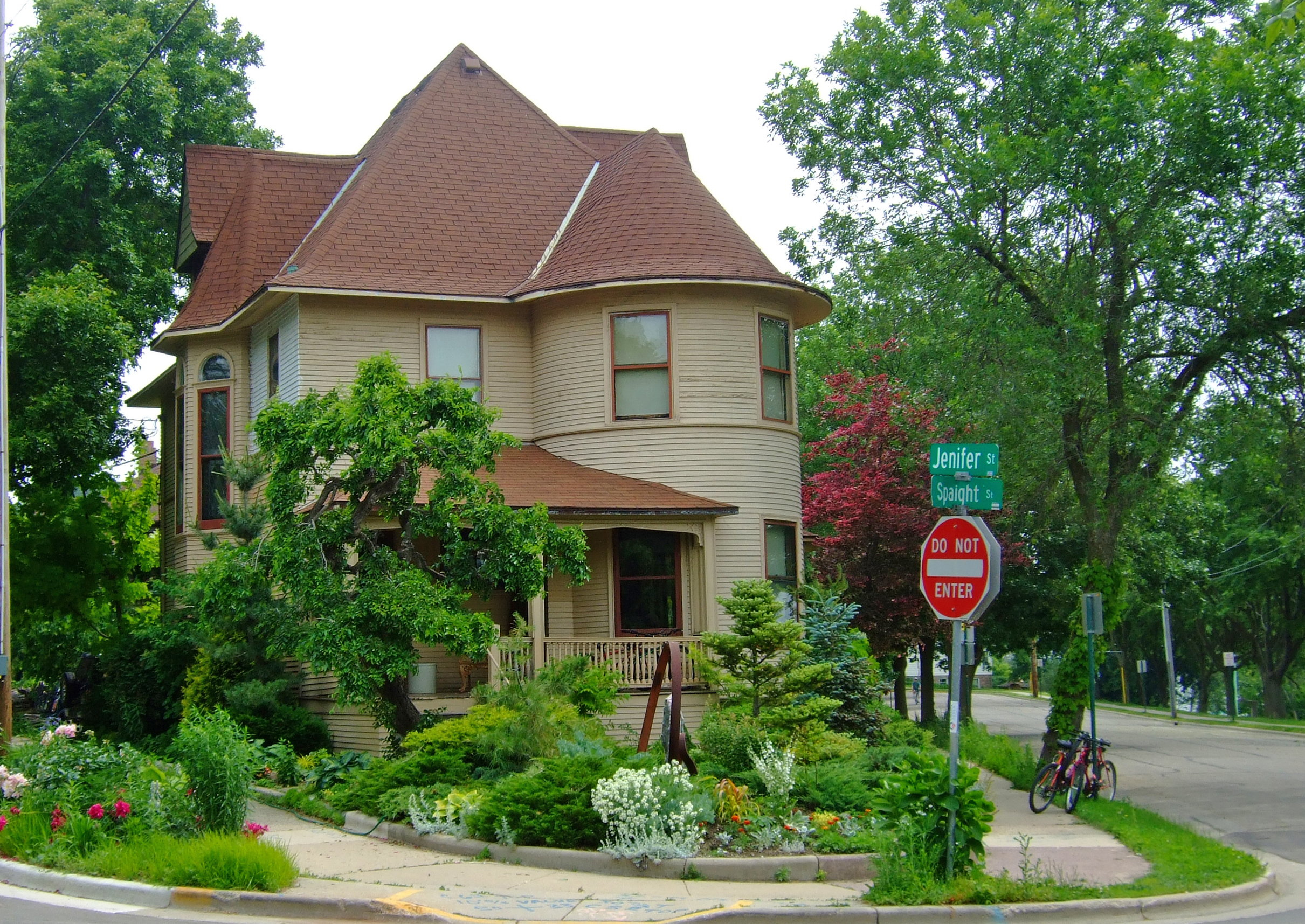
- Harlow Ott house, 1897, Queen Anne style
- Location: Jenifer and Spaight streets roughly bounded by Williamson and South Brearly streets Madison, Wisconsin; United States
- Area: 22.5 acres (9.1 ha)
- NRHP reference No.: 04001153
- Added to NRHP: October 13, 2004

The Jenifer-Spaight Historic District is a historic neighborhood a mile east of the capitol in Madison, Wisconsin, including houses built as early as 1854. In 2004 the district was added to the National Register of Historic Places (NRHP).

The district includes 113 contributing objects and roughly covers Jenifer and Spaight streets (which both run from southwest to northeast) from Jenifer Street's intersection with Williamson Street (which generally runs parallel with the other two streets) on the southwest to Brearly Street (a cross street) on the northeast. Within the district are three properties that are also listed individually on the NRHP: the John George Ott House, the Timothy C. and Katherine McCarthy House, and the Hyer's Hotel.

The neighborhood's streets and lots were mapped out in James Doty's original 1836 plat for the city of Madison. Most of Madison's initial construction took place near the capitol, but by the 1850s Leonard J. Farwell in particular was developing this area on the ridge along Lake Monona, and Williamson Street was a burgeoning business district serving the east side of the city and the country beyond. The arrival of the Chicago & North Western Railroad in 1864 and the Chicago, Milwaukee & St. Paul in 1869, and their depots just a block west of the district created more commerce, more travelers, and more opportunities for manufacturing and warehousing. In the 1880s three blocks of dealers in agricultural implements began to develop just north of Williamson St. All this growth was concentrated on the ridge along Lake Monona because the center of the isthmus was lowlands until the 1890s, when developers began filling that "Great Marsh." By this period, the neighborhoods near the capitol were getting crowded and some people began to look for less congested neighborhoods not far from the city center like this ridge along the lake. With the arrival of the automobile, people could live in more far-flung suburbs. In the 1920s the last open lots in the district were filled, and the structures in the neighborhood haven't changed much since the start of WWII.

The district contains buildings constructed from the 1850s to the 1940s, with the typical sequence of styles. Here are some good representatives in the order built:

- Governor Farwell's octagon house no longer exists, but was once the grand eminence of this neighborhood. Farwell was a developer of east Madison and Wisconsin Governor who had a large house built in 1854 - an octagon house 3-stories tall with stone walls, topped with a large cupola. The house stood around 929 Spaight St., with its grounds and outbuildings occupying all the area between Spaight, Breeley and Lake Monona. During the Civil War, the house was used as Harvey U.S. Army Hospital, and after the war as the Soldier's Orphan's Home. The grand structure was torn down in 1895 and the land subdivided for smaller houses. In 1908 a boulder with a plaque was installed to commemorate Farwell's grand house and the one-time hospital.

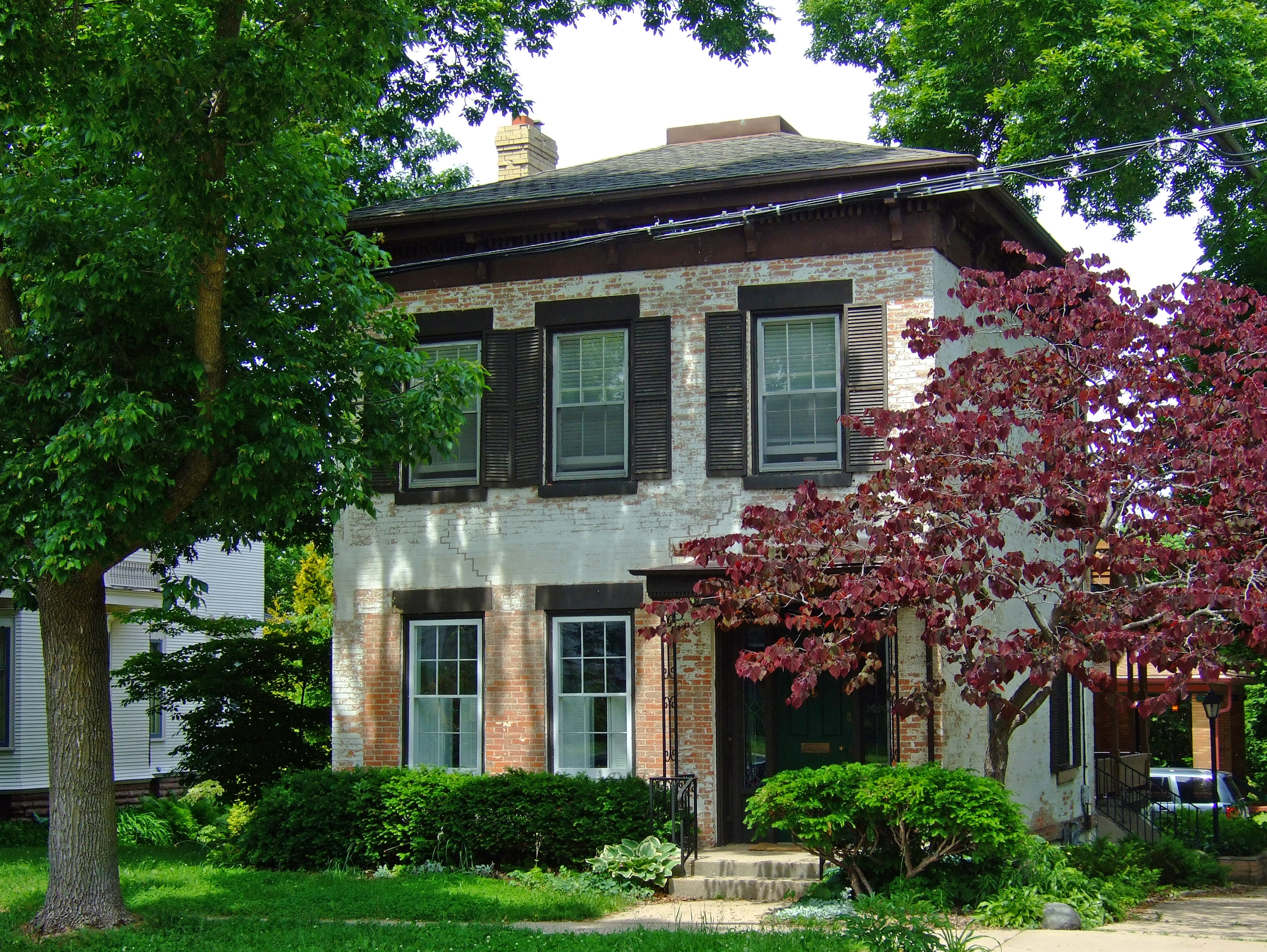
Hyer's Hotel, 1854, Italianate/Greek Revival style

- Hyer's Hotel at 864 Jenifer St is a 2-story hotel built in 1854 of soft red brick formed from clay from the shore of Lake Monona nearby. The window sills and lintels are plain from Greek Revival style, but the bracketed cornice is drawn from Italianate style. Over the years, the hotel and saloon served laborers, farmers, soldiers, and ordinary travelers.
- The Erastus Wyman house at 940 Spaight St was built in 1856. Its style is pretty classic Greek Revival, with a rather low-pitched, front gable roof with a cornice and frieze board, with cornice returns, and with plainly trimmed windows symmetrically arranged except for the big window on the first floor, which is probably a later modification. Wyman was a carpenter and lumber dealer.

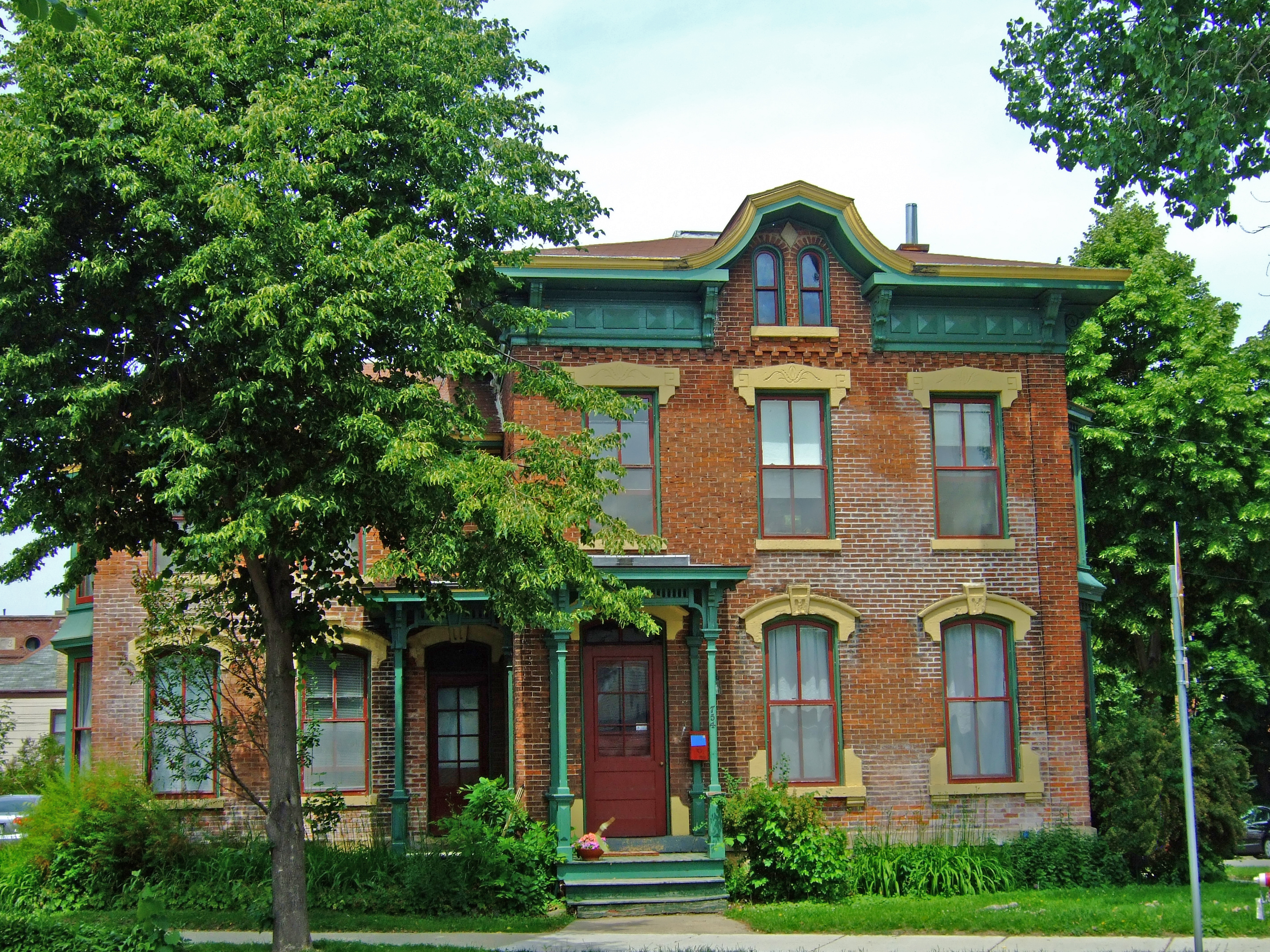
John George Ott house, 1873, Italianate style

- The John George Ott House at 754 Jenifer St is a 2-story house built in 1873. In contrast with Hyer's Hotel, it is more fully Italianate, with hood moulds on the windows, elaborate brackets under the eaves, and two-story bay windows. Ott was a German-Swiss immigrant who ran a grocery store on Williamson Street, a brickyard, and later an insurance and real estate business. He was also active in the Old Settler's Club, the Turnerverein, the Mannerchor, and the German Masonic Lodge.
- The Close house at 731 Jenifer St is an early, modest Queen Anne-style house built in 1891. Typical elements of the style present are the asymmetric front, the complex roof, the shingles in the front gable end, and the spindlework decorating the front porch. Adolph Close was a German immigrant tailor.
- The Harlow and Isabelle Ott house at 807 Jenifer St. (pictured above) is a fancier Queen Anne built 1897-1898, which exhibits a more complex roof than the Close house, the iconic Queen Anne corner tower, and porches that partially wrap around the tower.

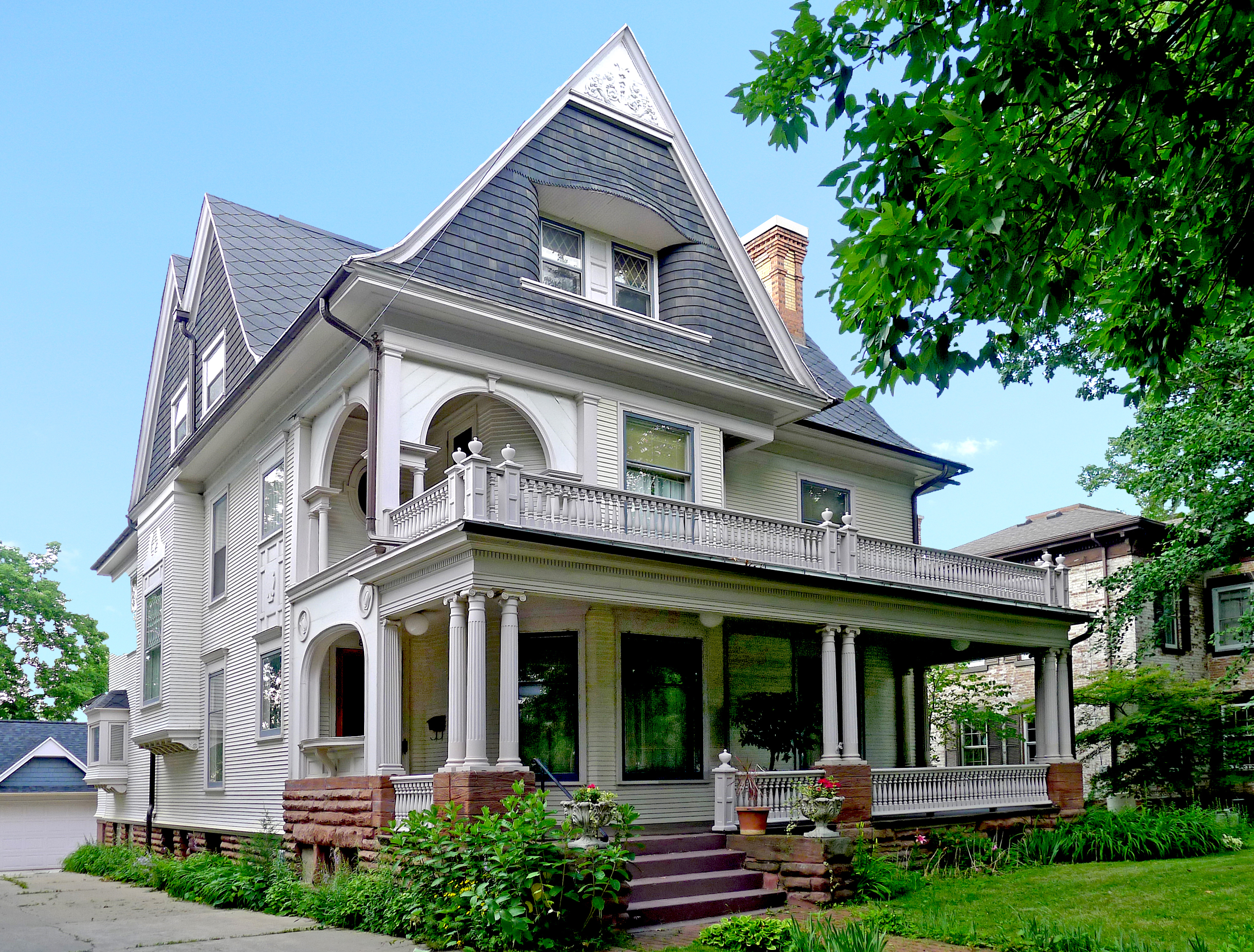
McCarthy house, 1897, Queen Anne free classic style

- The McCarthy house at 848 Jenifer St is a grand 2.5-story house built in 1897. It was designed by Lew Porter with many standard Queen Anne features: a complex roof, an asymmetric façade, shingles in the gable ends, bay windows, and prominent decorative chimneys. The Ionic columns supporting the porch, the pilasters and balusters are drawn from the Classical Revival style that was becoming popular as Queen Anne matured. Timothy McCarthy was an important building contractor in Madison around the time this house was built.
- The Mosel house at 812 Jenifer St is an American Foursquare-style house built in 1909. Typical of that style, the general shape is a cube with a hip roof. This one also has hip-roofed dormers, red brick cladding on the first story, and stucco cladding above. A large brick porch fronts the house.
- The Schubert house at 932 Spaight St is a 2.5-story Craftsman-style house designed by Claude & Starck and built in 1906. The hallmark of this style is the exposed rafter tails. Other than that, it has a hip roof with flared eaves, gable-roofed dormers clad in wood shingles, and a front porch supported by Ionic columns.
- The Charles Heyl house at 952-956 Spaight St was built in 1906 - a Prairie Style design by Claude & Starck with the usual horizontal emphasis in its broad flared eaves, in the porch roof, and in the relatively broad windows. The roof is broken by prominent round dormers and the porch is supported by polygonal columns.
- The Richardson house at 745 Jenifer St. was designed by Claude & Starck in Tudor Revival style and built 1908-1909. It stands two stories with a hip roof. The first story is clad in brick and the second in stucco with some half-timbering. The front of the house is dominated by a large two-story bay window whose design flows into a large dormer. Alongside the bay, a gable-roofed porch on columns echoes the shape of the dormer.

The district was added to the state and the national registers of historic places in 2004 - significant for its good representation of different architectural styles that "typify the stylistic and historic evolution of the district and of the larger area around it." In particular, the eight structures by Claude & Starck cover a range of their designs.

== See also ==
- National Register of Historic Places listings in Madison, Wisconsin
