= John George Ott House =

Historic house in Wisconsin, United States

- U.S. National Register of Historic Places
- U.S. Historic district – Contributing property
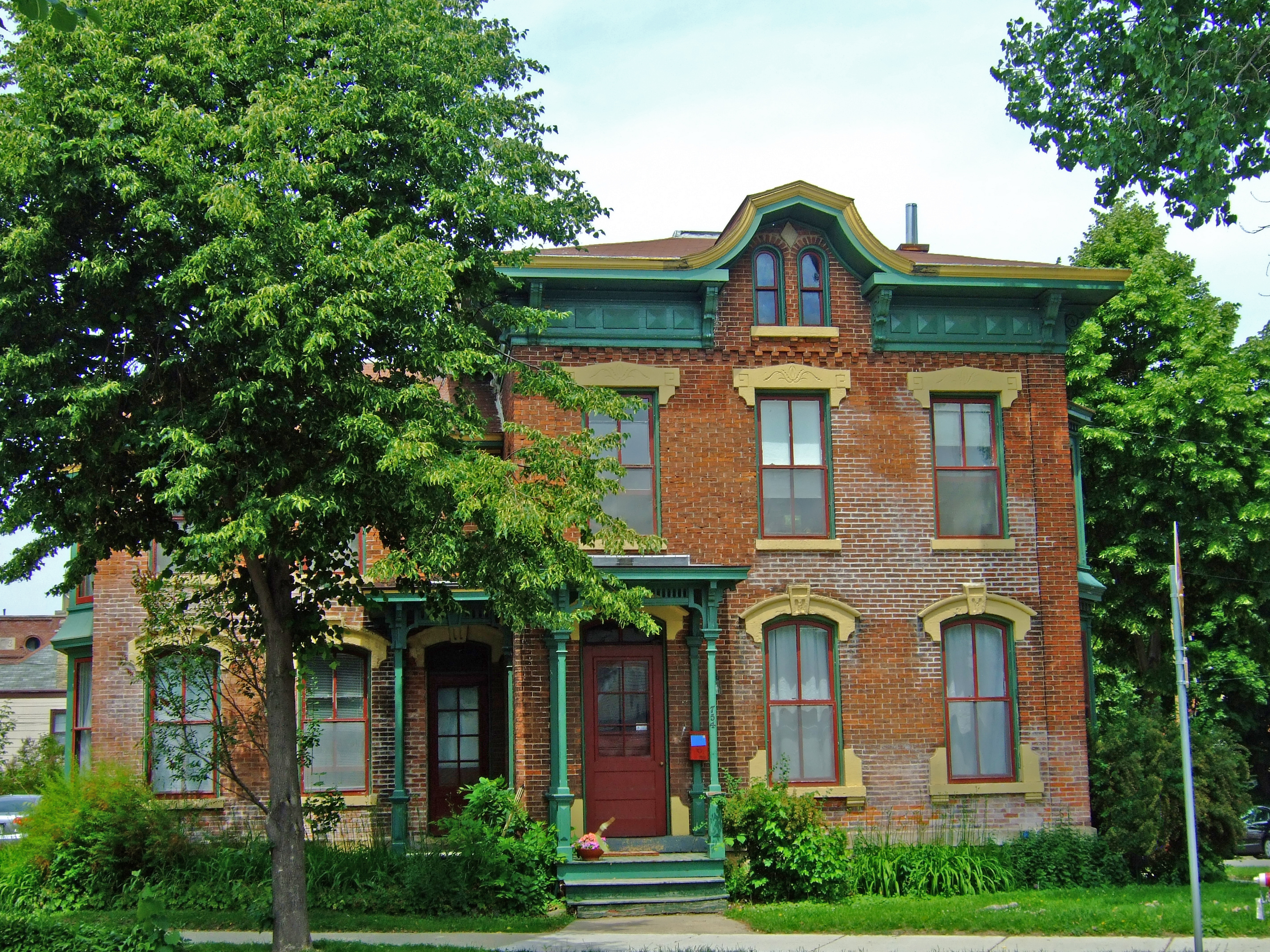
- John George Ott House, June 2009

- Location within Wisconsin Location within the United States
- Location: 754 Jenifer Street; Madison, Wisconsin
- Coordinates: 43°4′39″N 89°22′16″W
- Area: 0.11 acres (0.045 ha)
- Built: 1873
- Architectural style: Italianate
- Part of: Jenifer-Spaight Historic District (ID04001153)
- NRHP reference No.: 82000656

Significant dates
- Added to NRHP: September 23, 1982
- Designated CP: October 13, 2004

The John George Ott House is an ornate Italianate-styled home built in 1873 in Madison, Wisconsin for Swiss immigrant Ott. In 1982, it was listed on the National Register of Historic Places.

== History ==
13-year-old John George Ott immigrated to Madison from Schaffhausen, Switzerland in 1850. He started clerking in a store and in three years managed to save $850. He later recalled that he "was so much encouraged by my phenomenal success, that I undertook to purchase a homestead and built a store in a location which at that time was known as 'in the woods.'" Ott's lot faced onto Williamson Street and he built his store on that side. He ran the store there for fourteen years, selling groceries and items like whiskey by the barrel. In 1868, he started a brickyard, which he operated until 1872. In 1872, he began selling accident insurance, fire insurance, and real estate.

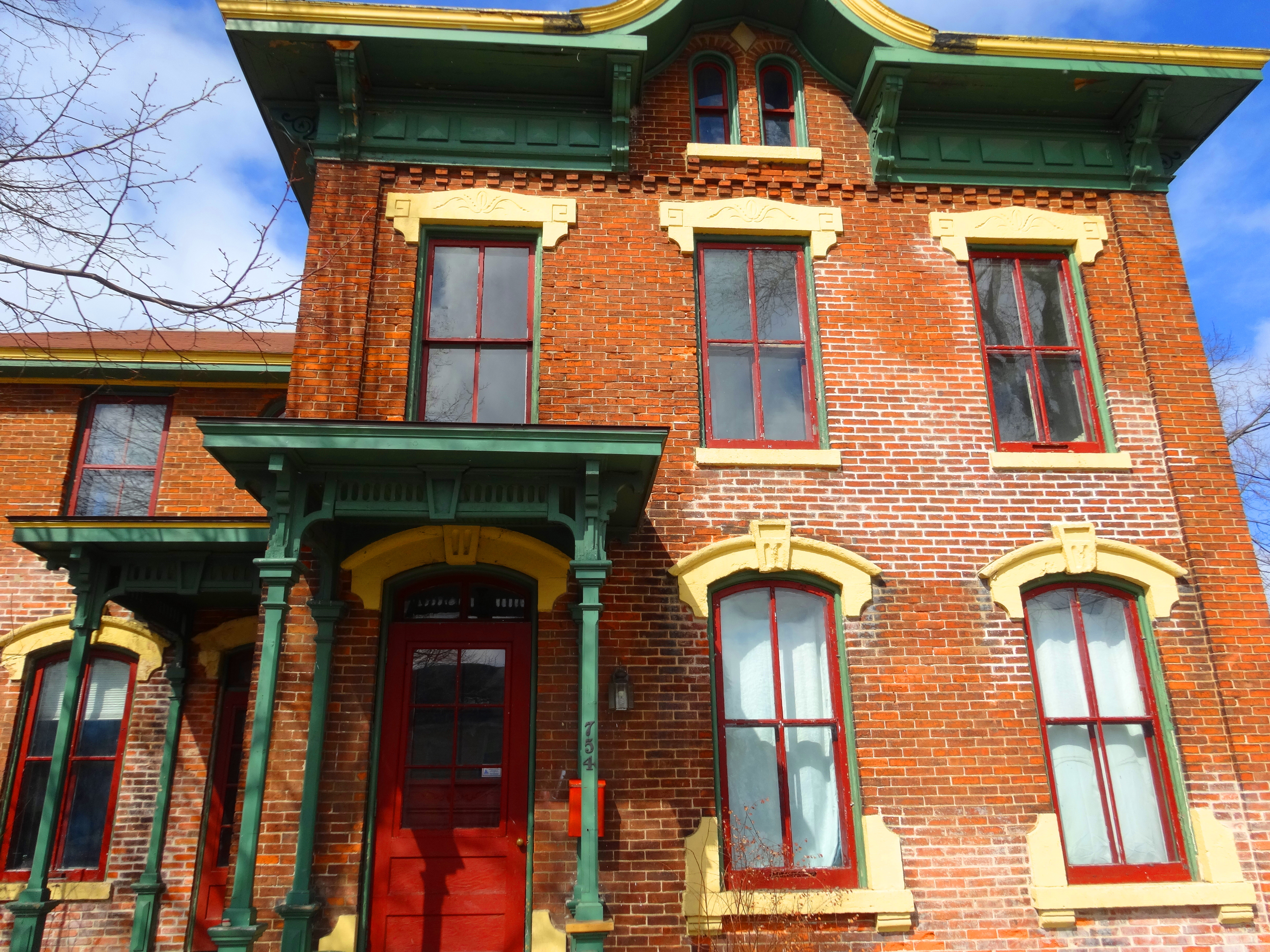
Close up view of the John George Ott House, March 2014

In 1873, Ott started building the house that is the subject of this article, on the Jenifer Street side of the lot where his store was. The house is in High Victorian Italianate style, with walls made of brick that may have come from Ott's own brickyard. The windows are framed in ornate sandstone sills and lintels. A line of brick corbels runs beneath a wooden cornice and eaves. In the front center the straight eaves are interrupted by a curved dormer which shelters two tombstone-shaped windows. The roof is shallow and hipped, and was originally topped with a cupola. Wings and bays flank the central block. The High Victorian subtype of Italianate that this house represents is unusual in Madison, where most other Italianate houses are of the Italian Villa or the square-massed subtypes.

During Ott's years living in the house, he was active in the Old Settlers Club, he helped found Madison's German Masonic Lodge, he helped found Madison's Turnverein, and he was a member of the Maennerchor. He served on the city council, the county board, and as a Justice of the Peace. He also organized his neighbors in the Sixth Ward to create Madison's first public park, converting an old cemetery into Orton Park. After he died in 1914, his family lived in the house on Jenifer Street until 1973.

From 1975 to 1986, R. Richard Wagner lived in the house. He had been involved in historic preservation, helping to establish Madison's Landmarks Commission and then chairing it through its early years. He restored several houses in the Marquette neighborhood and worked toward revitalization of the Williamson Street corridor. In 1980, he was the first openly gay person on the Dane County Board of Supervisors, and went on to serve as its chair for four terms, supporting LGBTQ protections and the development of Monona Terrace and Olbrich Botanical Gardens. Over the years he served on other commissions around Madison.

In 1979, the house was designated a landmark by the Madison Landmarks Commission. In 1982, it was listed on the NRHP, significant as "one of the finest High Victorian Italianate residences in Madison," and as the home of one of the first non-Yankee settlers in Madison, who rose from a penniless immigrant to a prominent community leader. Additionally, the house is located within the Jenifer-Spaight Historic District.

== See also ==
- National Register of Historic Places listings in Madison, Wisconsin
