= Timothy C. and Katherine McCarthy House =

Historic house in Wisconsin, United States

- U.S. National Register of Historic Places
- U.S. Historic district – Contributing property
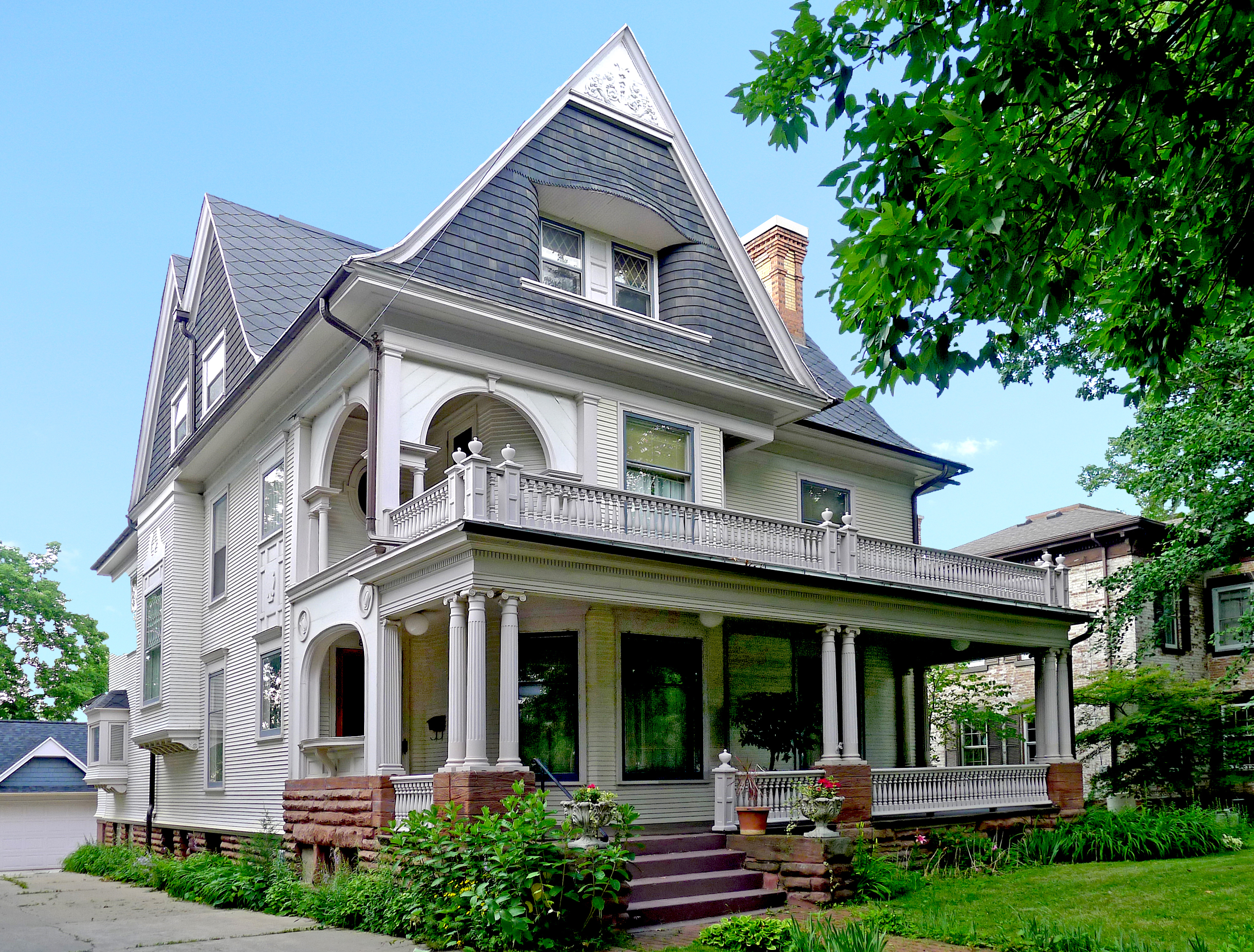
- Timothy C. and Katherine McCarthy House, June 2014
- Location: 848 Jenifer Street; Madison, Wisconsin; United States
- Coordinates: 43°04′41″N 89°22′11″W
- Area: less than one acre
- Built: 1897
- Architect: Lew F. Porter
- Architectural style: Queen Anne
- Part of: Jenifer-Spaight Historic District (ID04001153)
- NRHP reference No.: 02000813

Significant dates
- Added to NRHP: July 17, 2002
- Designated CP: October 13, 2004

The Timothy C. and Katherine McCarthy House is a grand 2.5-story Queen Anne-styled house a mile east of the capitol square in Madison, Wisconsin, United States, built in 1897 for prominent contractor McCarthy, whose firm would build much of the current Wisconsin State Capitol. In 2002 McCarthy's house was added to the National Register of Historic Places.

== History ==
Timothy C. McCarthy was born in 1853 - probably in Buffalo, New York - and came to Madison with his family the following year. He started as a stonemason and expanded his building skills until in 1883 he supervised construction of the Dane County Courthouse, a major project designed by Allan Conover and Lew Porter. Other projects he supervised are the UW's 1885-87 Science Hall, the 1888 St. Patrick's Church, the 1885-1886 UW Chemistry building, the 1891-93 UW Law building, the 1892-94 UW Armory/Gymnasium, and the 1897 Agricultural Dean's house. In that same year, McCarthy began building a new home for himself on Jenifer Street, from a design by Lew Porter.

Porter had been a student at the UW studying civil engineering. He left his studies in his junior year to partner with his professor Allan Conover around 1885. They designed many of the buildings above that Tim McCarthy built: the Dane County Courthouse, Science Hall, the Chemistry Lab, and the Red Gym. McCarthy must have liked Porter's work because he hired him to design his own house.

The house stands 2.5 stories, Queen Anne in style. McCarthy used it as both home and office, and he probably saw it as a showplace for the capabilities of his construction firm in residential architecture. The external foundation is rusticated rose-colored Superior sandstone, aiming to make the whole composition feel solid, as often done in Richardsonian Romanesque style. Above that rise walls clad in narrow clapboard, interrupted by various bays and ornaments. A full-width porch spans the front of the building, supported by graceful grouped Ionic columns, and with a balustrade above. Those columns place the design in the free classic subtype of Queen Anne style. Though the porch is symmetric, the protruding gable end above it is not, which fulfills the typical asymmetric façade of Queen Anne style. The gable ends are shingled - typical of Queen Anne, and some of the windows are recessed behind curved surfaces - a flourish more common in Shingle style. The roof is complex, with various dormers and cross-gables. Elaborate corbelled chimneys top the design. Flares at the eaves-line and the bottom of the siding help tie together the design. Other decorations are described in the NRHP nomination.

Inside, the front door opens into a vestibule which opens into a foyer with the grand staircase. One pocket door leads from there to the living room, with a Rumford fireplace. Another pocket door leads to the music room. The kitchen and dining room are behind the staircase. The dining room has paneled wainscoting and a plate rail. The first floor's flooring is narrow white oak. The woodwork is also white oak. The grand staircase is quite elaborate, with round arches, spindles and panels. (Photos are linked to from the NRHP registration in the references below.) Halfway up the stairs is a window seat. On the second story, the master bedroom has a fireplace with tulip tiles and window seats on each side. Other bedrooms are finished more simply. The third floor was originally unfinished. The basement is divided into nine rooms by load-bearing brick walls.

In 1902 the Wisconsin State Journal judged McCarthy to be "Madison's leading building contractor." After building this house, McCarthy's firm went on to build much of the new Wisconsin State Capitol after the old one burned in 1904. They worked again with Lew Porter, who was Supervising Architect on the project, building the west, south, central and north sections of the new capitol. A 1916 letter from Porter to McCarthy shows their polite working friendship:

Friend Tim, I greatly hesitate to again call your attention to the removal of your shed. I feel sure that if you know how it hampered things and what an annoyance it was to me, you would have attended to it long before this...

McCarthy's firm went on to build the 1909 Capitol Heating and Power Plant (also designed by Porter), the 1908-1910 Lathrop Hall, and the 1909 St. Paul's University Chapel. Building the State Capitol was a huge project, continuing until 1918, and it was one of the last projects for McCarthy's construction firm.

As McCarthy's construction business wound down, he got into banking. He was an original stockholder of the Mercantile and Savings Bank and served as its president from 1913 to 1921, when it merged with First National. At the time of his death in 1928, he was a director of First National Bank and the Central Wisconsin Trust Company.

After McCarthy died, his family lived in the house on Jenifer Street until 1930. In the 1960s it was subdivided into rental apartments. In the 1970s it housed a home for delinquent boys. In 1988 it was restored as a single-family home. In 2002 the house was added to the state and the national registers of historic places. Additionally, it is located within the Jenifer-Spaight Historic District.

== Products of McCarthy's construction firm ==
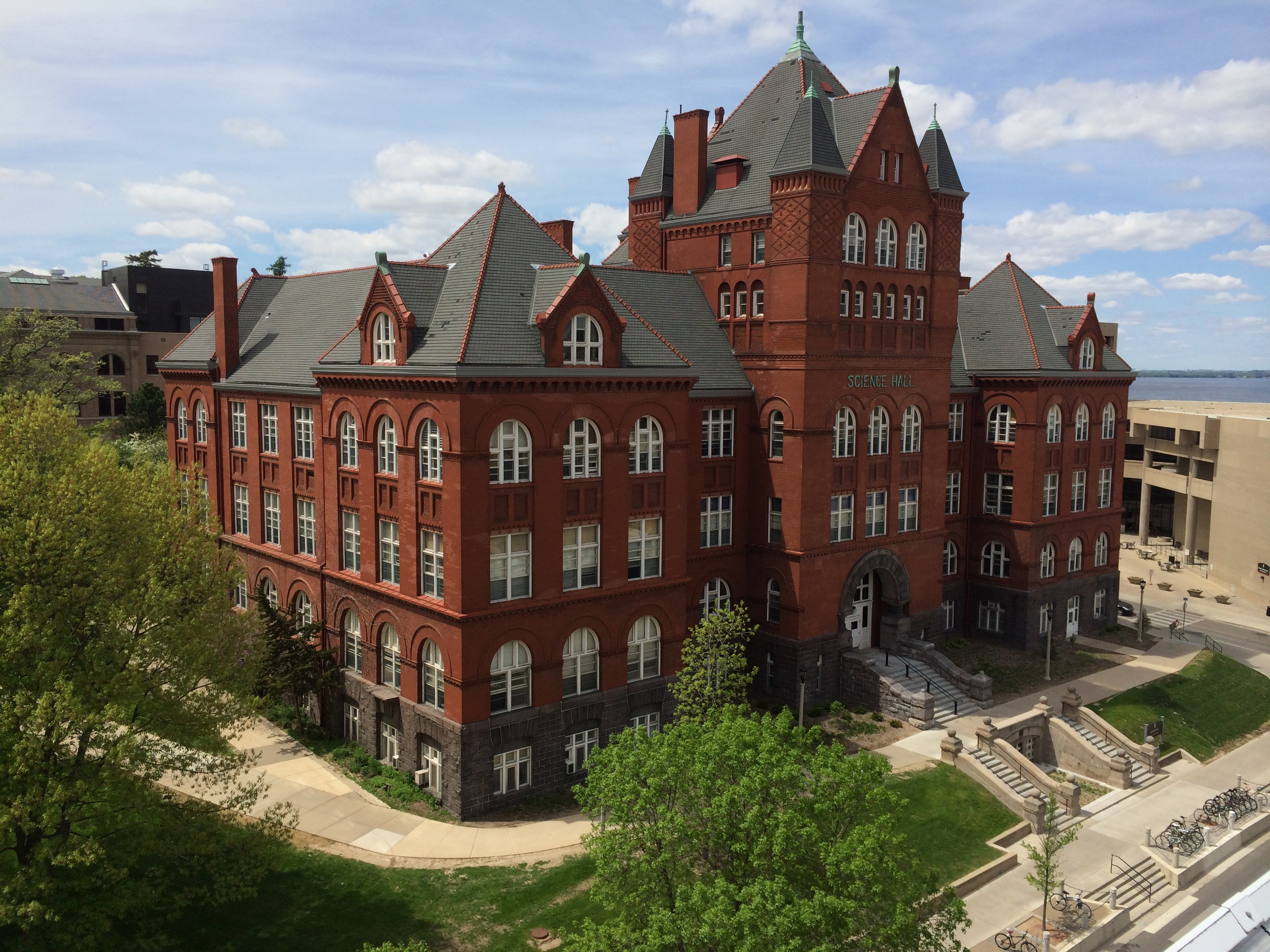
1885–87, UW Science Hall

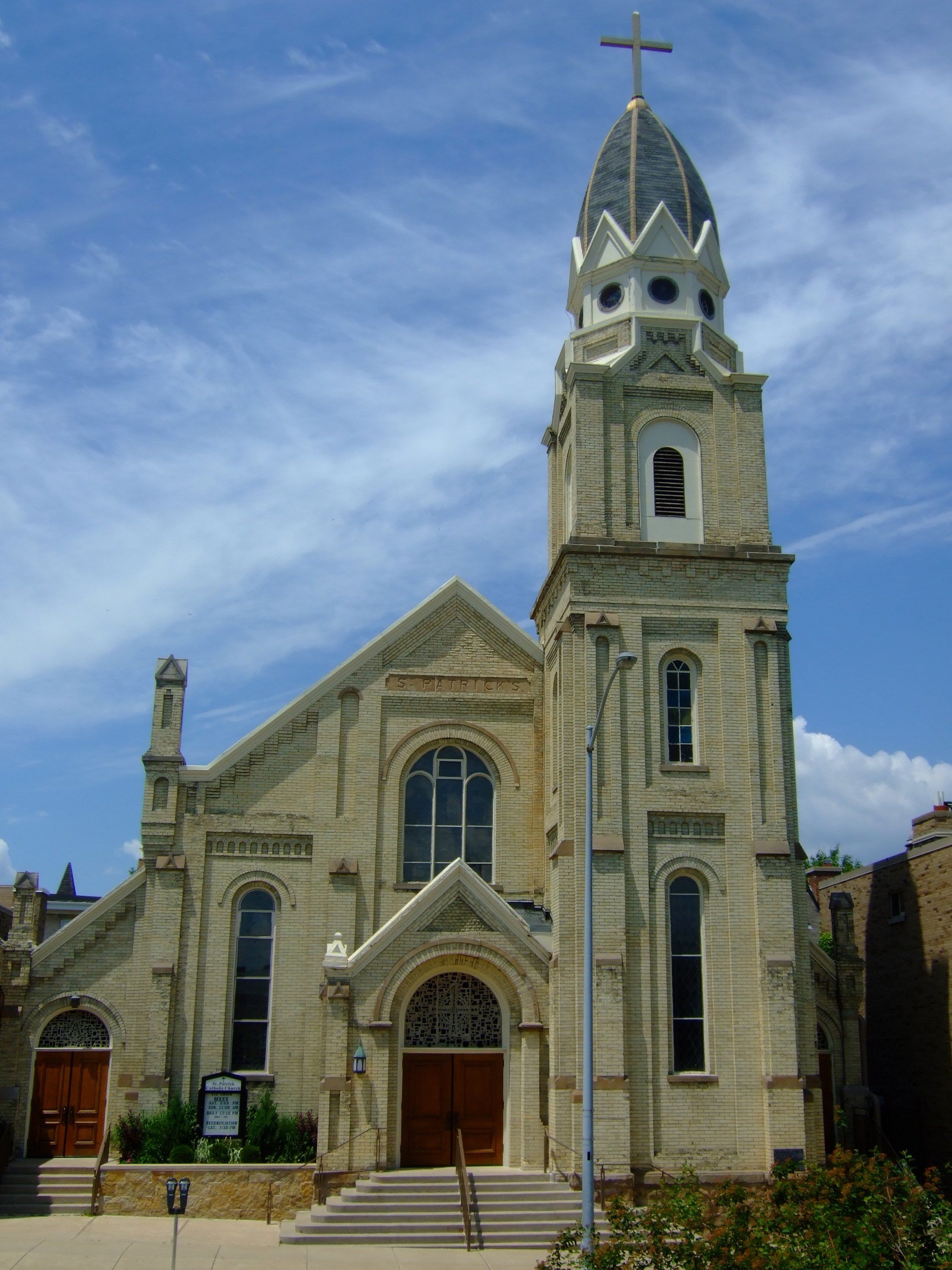
1888, St Patrick's Church, McCarthy's own parish

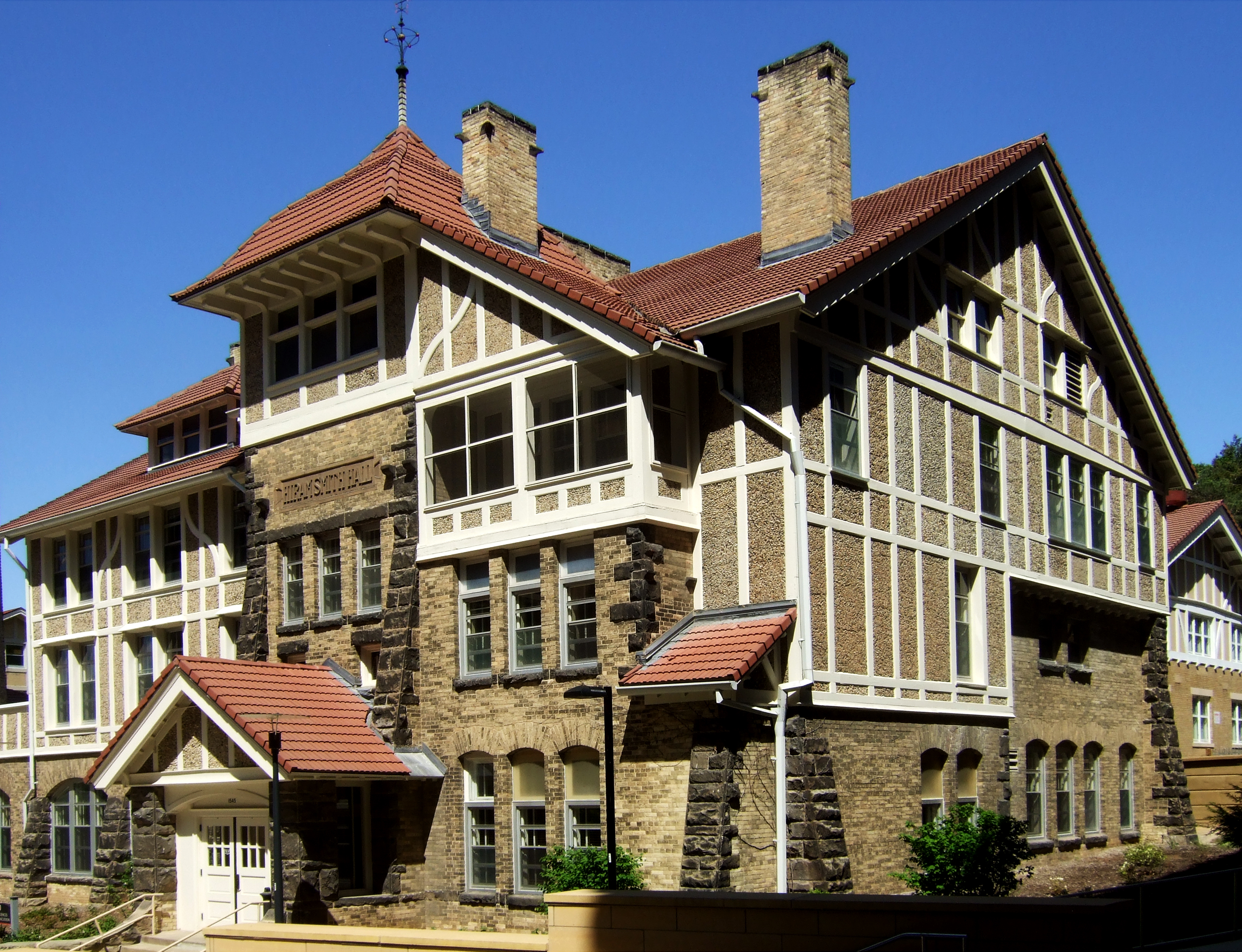
1891, Hiram Smith Hall

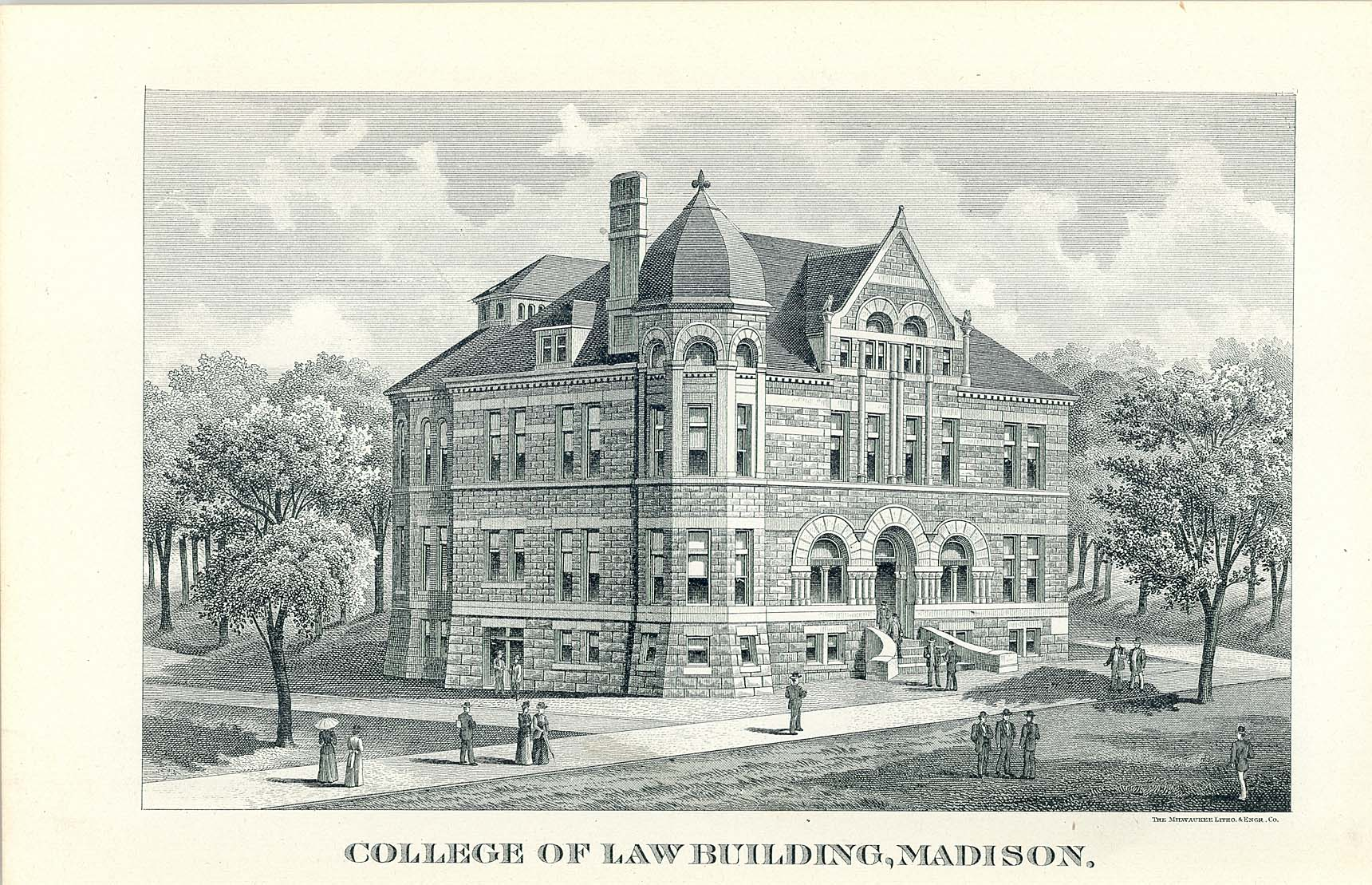
1893, UW Law Building

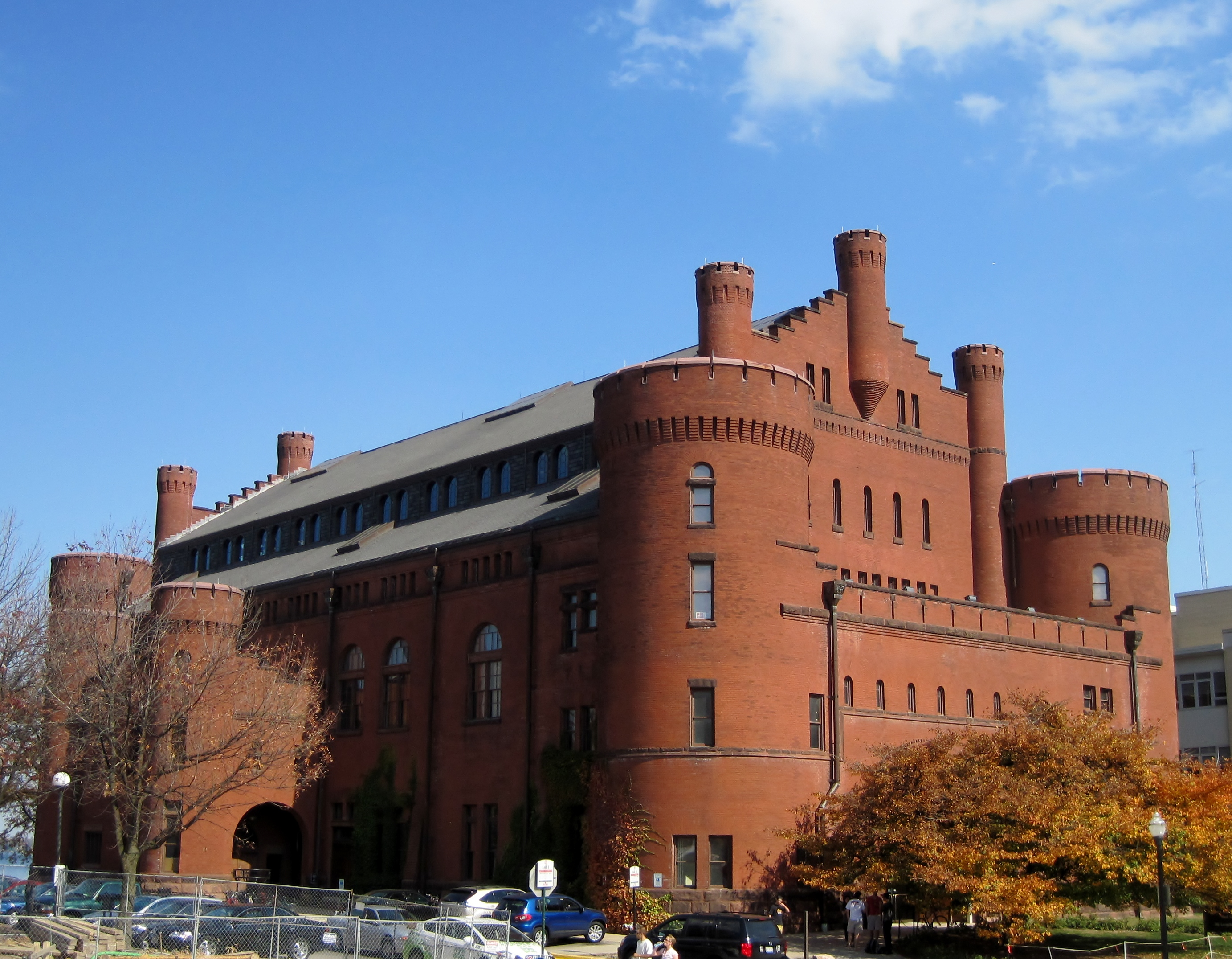
1894, UW Armory and Gymnasium

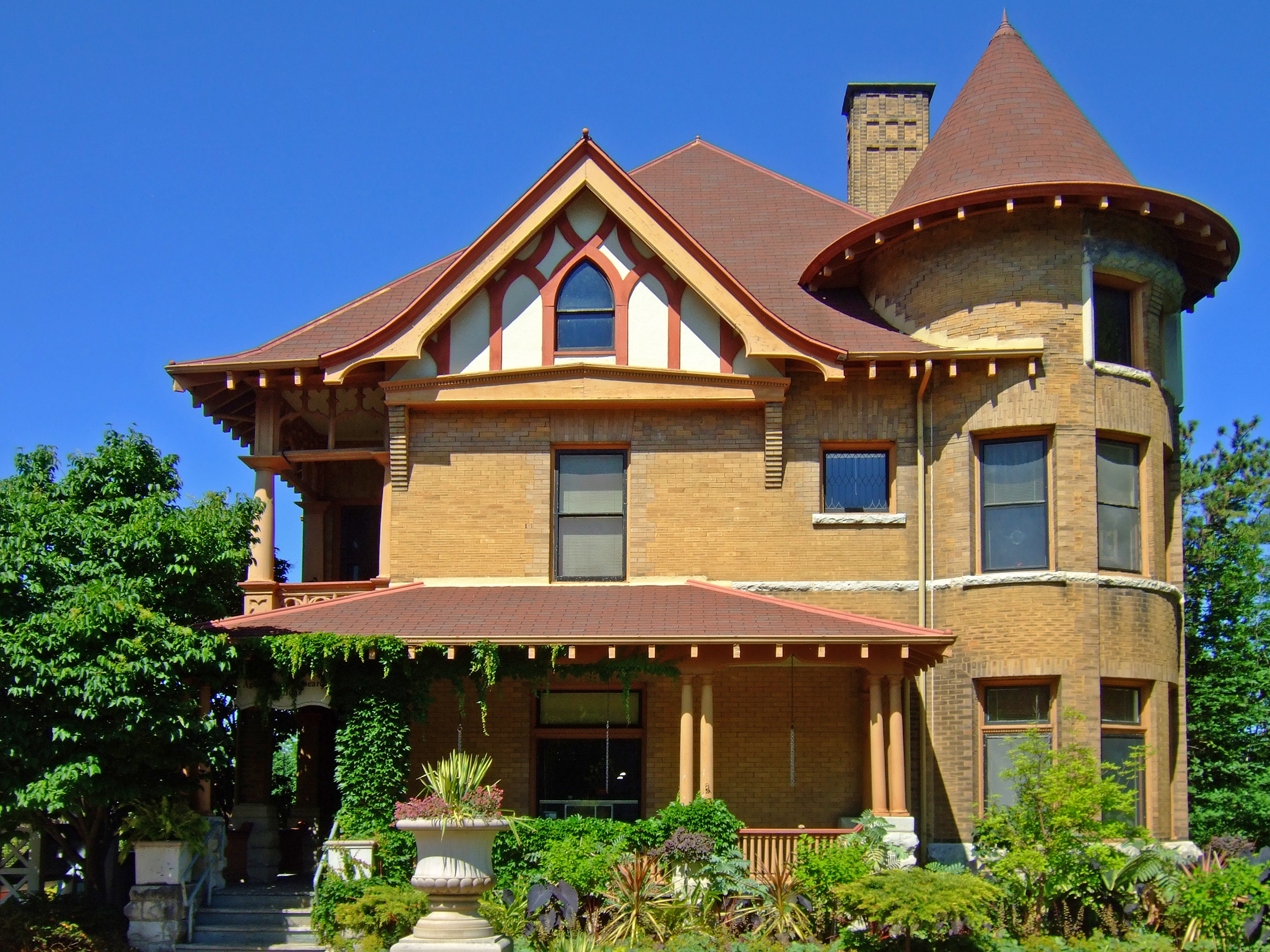
1896, UW Agricultural Dean's House

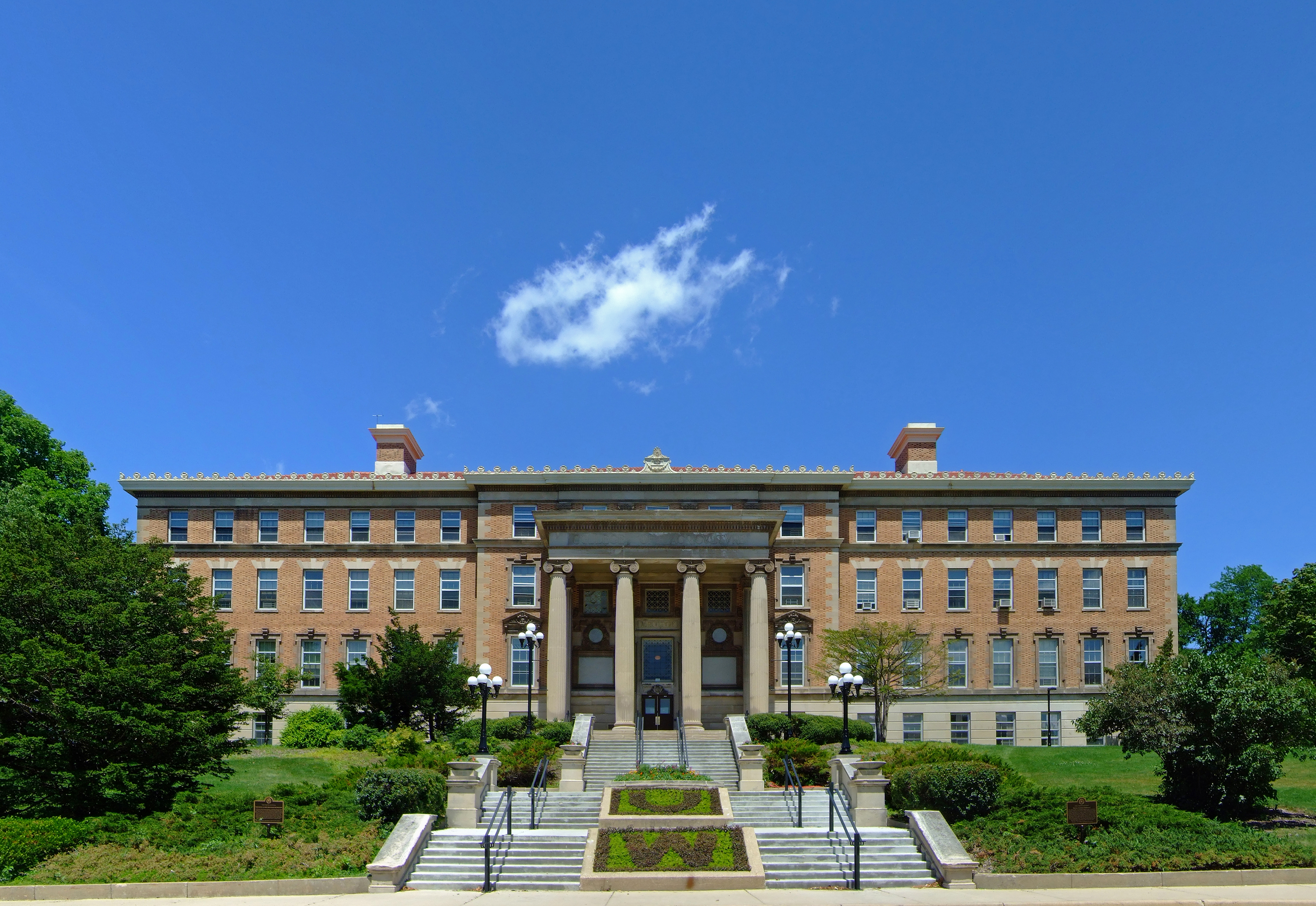
1902–03, UW Agriculture Hall

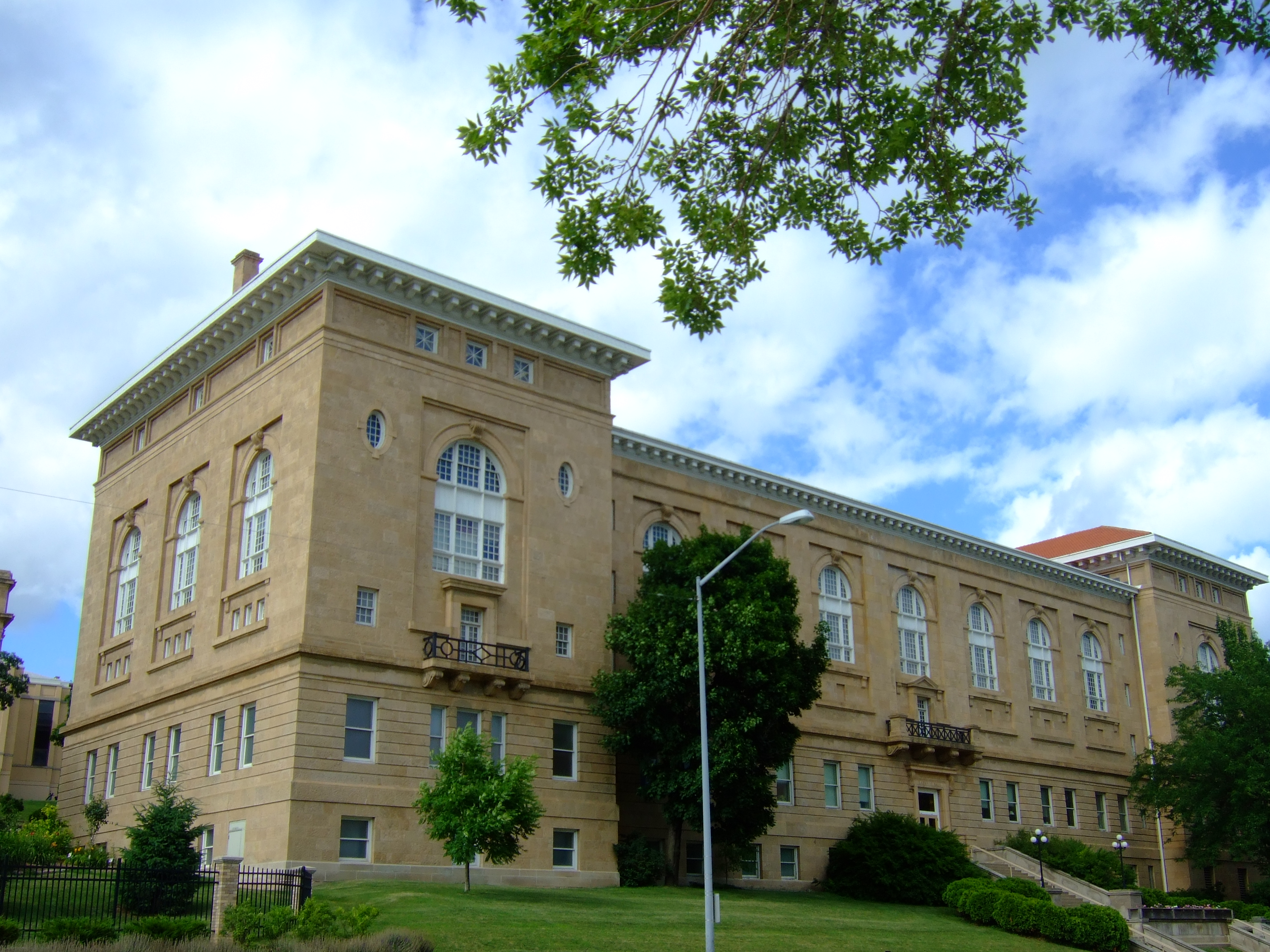
1908, UW Lathrop Hall

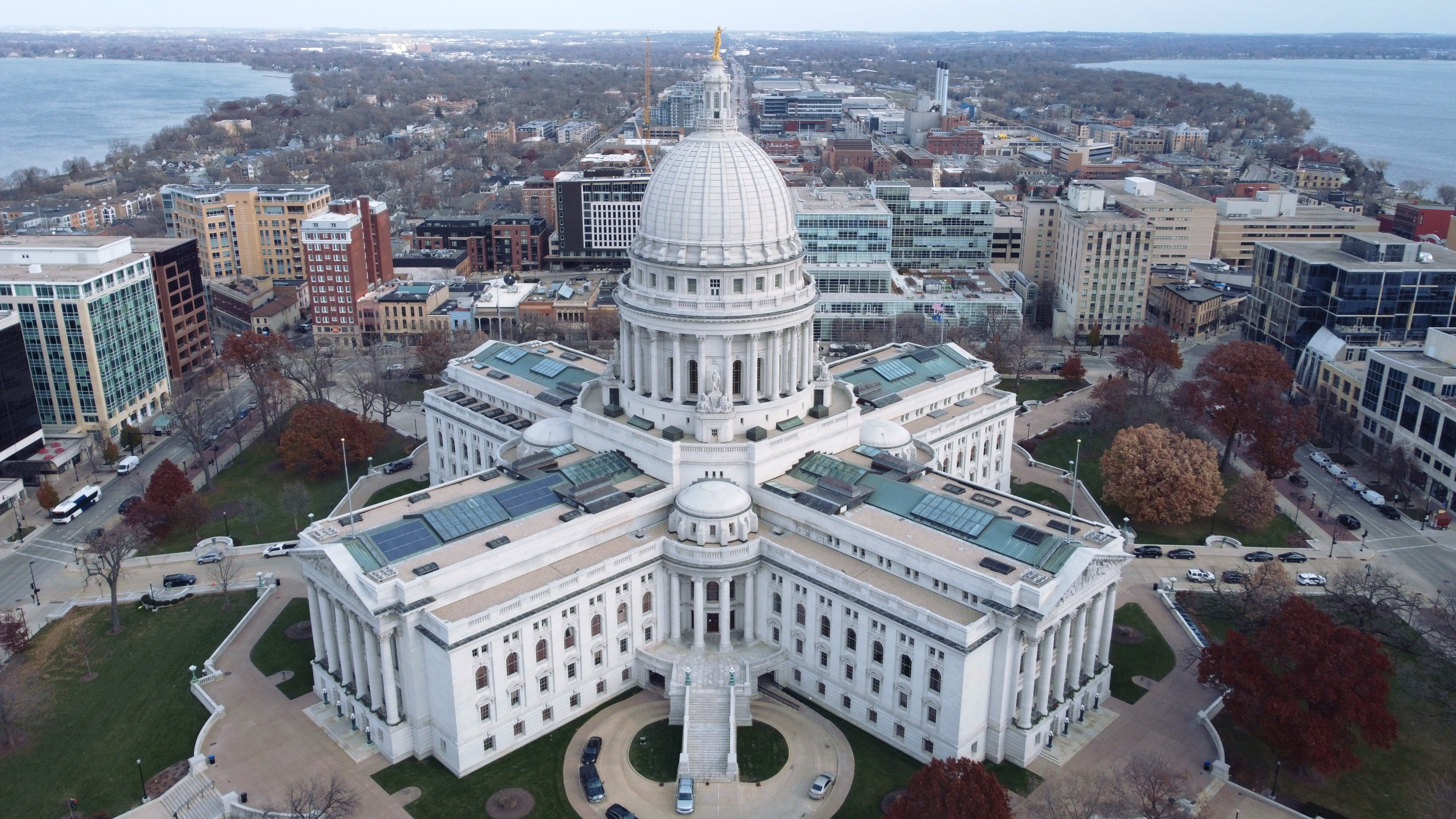
1906–17, Wisconsin State Capitol

== See also ==
- National Register of Historic Places listings in Madison, Wisconsin
