= McCormick–International Harvester Company Branch House =

- U.S. National Register of Historic Places
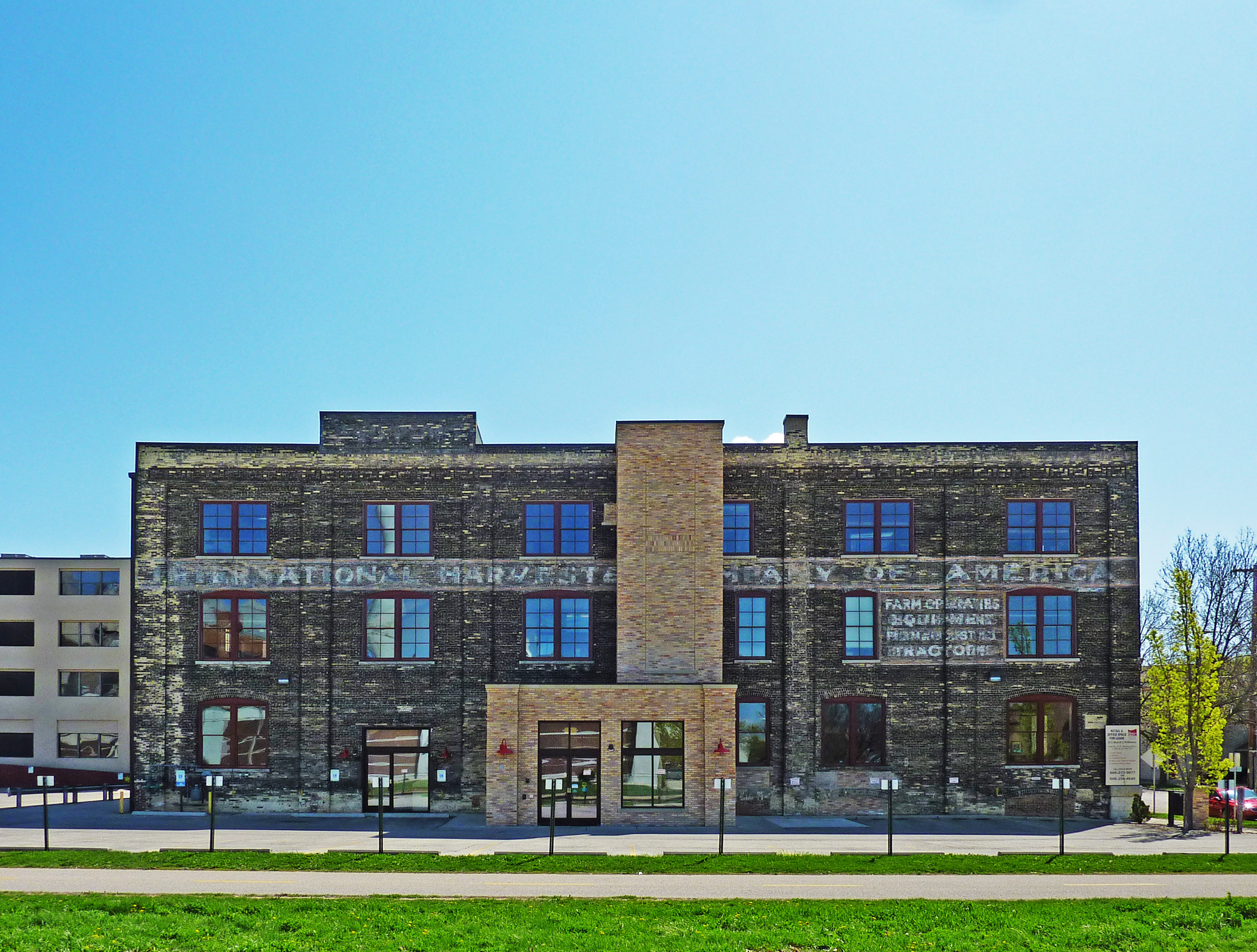
- Location: 301 S. Blount St. Madison, Wisconsin
- Coordinates: 43.077593°N 89.373664°W
- Built: 1898
- NRHP reference No.: 10000231
- Added to NRHP: April 27, 2010

The McCormick–International Harvester Company Branch House was built in 1898 in Madison, Wisconsin as a distribution center for farm implements of the McCormick Harvesting Machine Company. After McCormick merged into the International Harvester Company in 1902, the building was expanded and served the same function for the new company. In 2010 it was added to the National Register of Historic Places.

== History ==
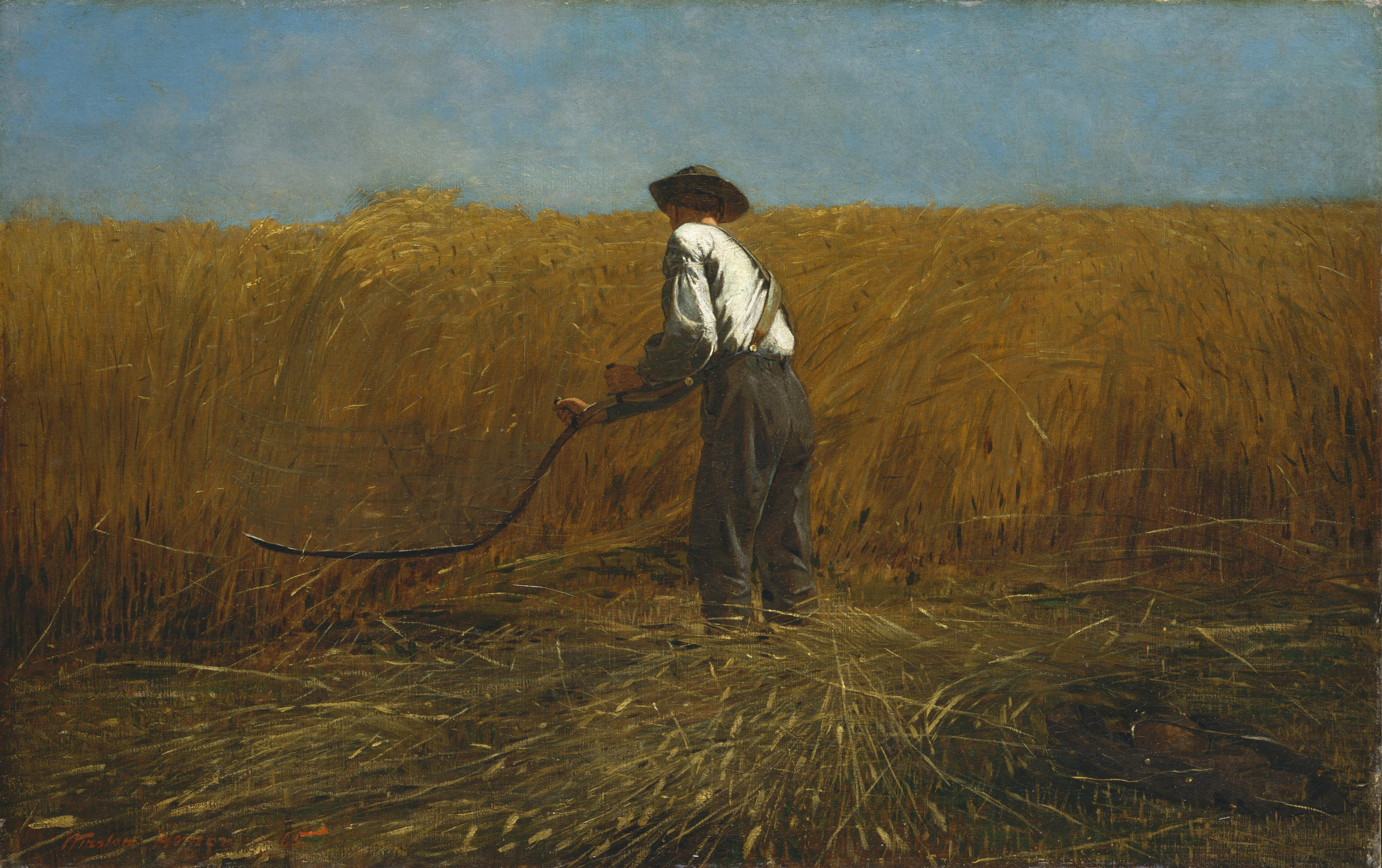
Winslow Homer, The Veteran in a New Field

Prior to industrialization, people harvested small grains like wheat by swinging a scythe and then manually tying the cut stems into bundles to dry. This was slow heavy work, with six people able to harvest about two acres of wheat in a day. With the Industrial Revolution, various people began trying to build machines to speed up the process.

One of those tinkerers was Robert McCormick, a prosperous Virginia farmer. In the early 1800s he constructed a horse-drawn machine for cutting (reaping) grain. Robert was an inventor, but not a businessman. Though he patented some ideas, they never got far from his farm. His son Cyrus, however, was a promoter and businessman.

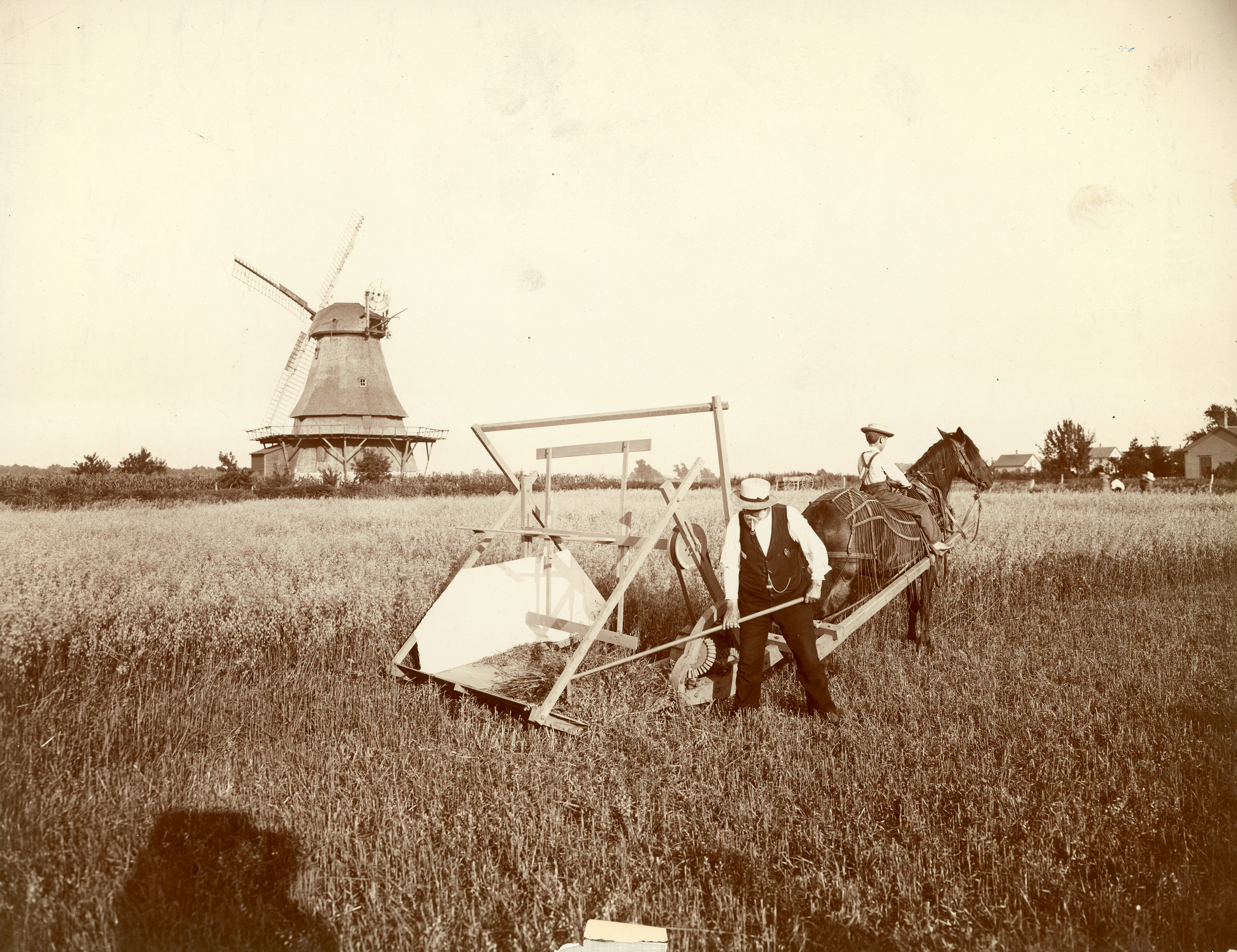
McCormick's reaper in mid-1800s

In 1831 and 1832 Cyrus staged demonstrations of what the family reaper could do near his home. It impressed people on flat land, but did less well on hills. Obed Hussey of Ohio patented a reaper in 1833, which may have pushed Cyrus to patent his in 1834, but instead of rushing to sell, the McCormicks improved their design through the 1830s. Cyrus resumed public demonstrations in 1839 and sold two homemade reapers in 1840 for $110 each. They sold seven more in 1841. In 1843 a competition was held in which Hussey's reaper cut two acres and McCormick's larger reaper cut seven.

Until 1843 the reapers were produced in the shop on the McCormick farm. In 1844 Cyrus began licensing the McCormick design to others to produce, including a company in upstate New York, but quality problems emerged at these other shops. In 1847 Cyrus consolidated production at one factory in Chicago, which was then a frontier town, but closer to the grain-growing prairies and water transportation. In 1849, the factory in Chicago made 1,500 reapers. The factory was destroyed in the Great Chicago Fire of 1871, but McCormick rebuilt and branched out into new products, mostly by buying patents from other inventors. For example, they bought the rights to a "harvester" attachment for bundling the grain from a reaper from the Marsh Brothers. In 1884 McCormick's one factory in Chicago built 55,000 machines. In 1902 it built 35% of the US's farm machinery.

In the 1880s McCormick shifted from a jobber system of distributing their equipment to a branch house system, in which McCormick itself established regional outlets which acted as agents for the manufacturer, selling a full line of products to independent retailers, who sold direct to farmers. Each branch house employed "blockmen" salesmen who each covered a chunk of territory; canvassers who tried to interest farmers in the product, helping both the blockmen and the dealers; and machinery experts who helped install, adjust and repair machines. The branch houses also provided credit to finance dealers' inventories, along with collection services. The regional branch houses were a step closer to the customer than McCormick's headquarters in Chicago.

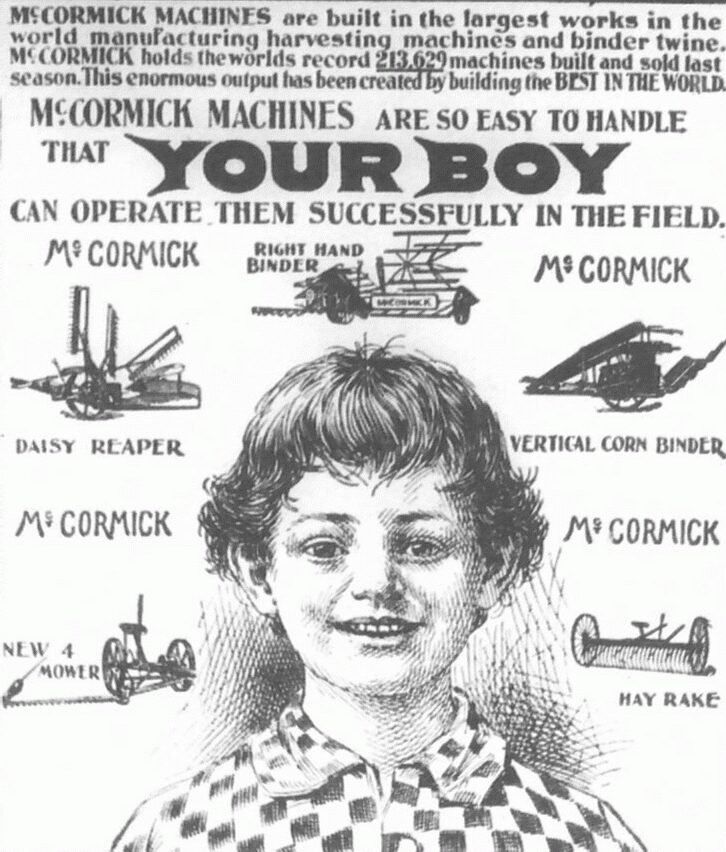
This advertisement from around 1900 gives an idea of the range of McCormick's products at the time this branch house was built: grain reapers, grain reaper-binders, corn binders, hay mowers, and hay rakes.

In 1895 McCormick established its first branch house in Madison. Madison by then had nine rail lines radiating out to various smaller towns in the farm country of southern Wisconsin and Illinois. That first branch house was in rented space, but two years later, in 1897, McCormick bought lots on S. Blount Street near the Madison and Watertown Railroad tracks, and build the first section of the Branch House building that is the subject of this article, for $4,500. It is a simple three-story cream brick building with a Greek key design circling the top, and a flat roof. The original windows were double-hung with wood frames. Other implement dealers were nearby - notably in the Machinery Row on Williamson Street - but McCormick's building must have been impressive, because it was at times called the "King of Implement Row."

In 1902 McCormick merged with Deering Harvester Company, Plano Harvester Company, Milwaukee Harvester Company, and Warder, Bushnell & Glessner Company to form the International Harvester Company. Cyrus McCormick Jr. was the President. In 1909 the new company began expanding the Branch House in Madison, doubling its size. Offices were moved to the second floor alongside a showroom. The third floor warehoused parts.

IH used the building until 1953. By then better shipping had reduced the need for the branch houses, and IH moved to a smaller building near the airport. Reynolds Transfer and Storage bought the building. Some windows were filled with brick in 1978 and offices were redone. In 2008 another refurbishment undid some of the changes from the '70s. Several painted ghost signs remain visible on the outside of the building: "OIL TRACTORS," "INTERNATIONAL HARVESTER COMPANY OF AMERICA," and "FARM... TRACTORS."
