= Christian Dick Block =

- U.S. National Register of Historic Places
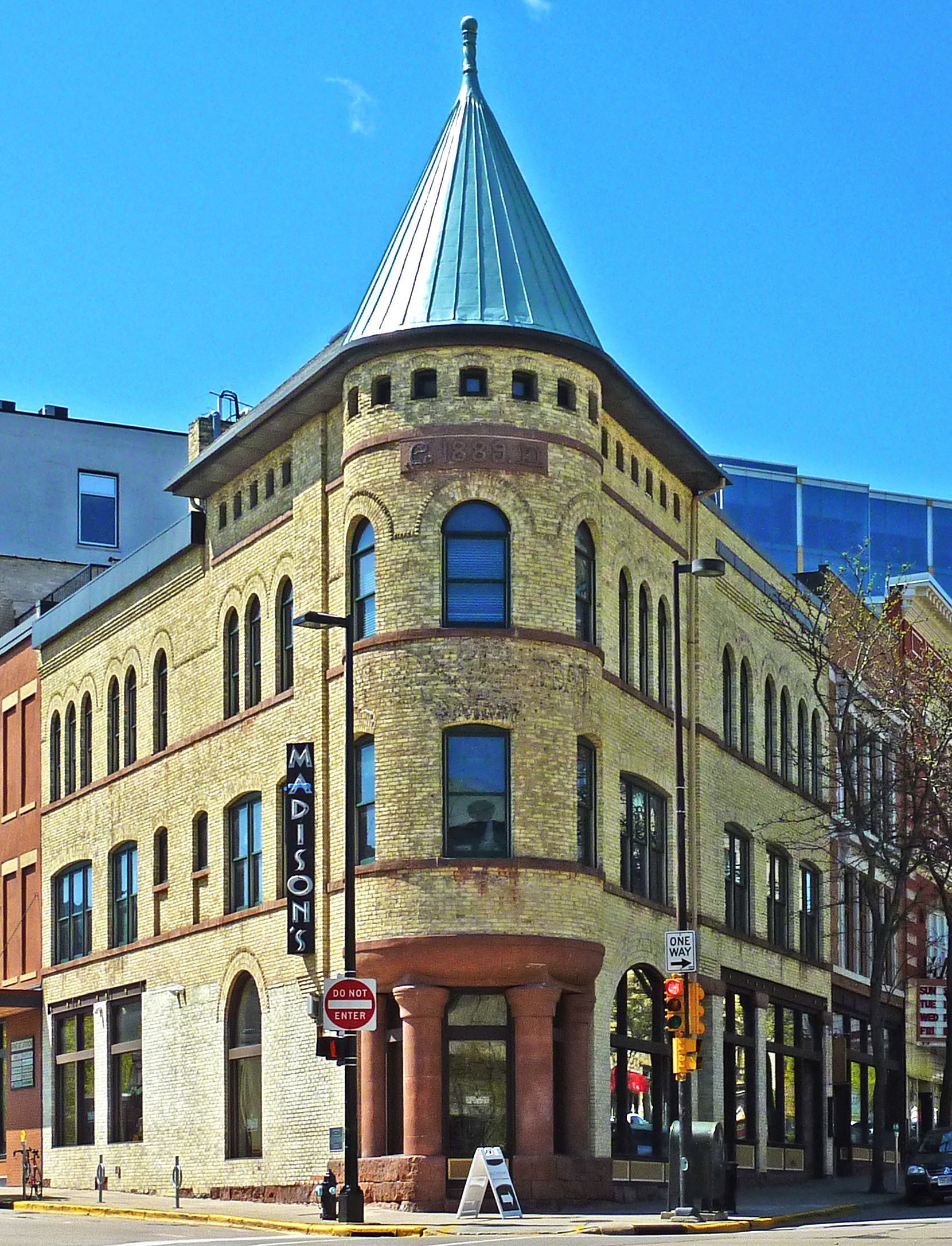

- Location within Wisconsin Location within the United States
- Location: 106 E. Doty St., Madison, Wisconsin
- Coordinates: 43°4′28″N 89°22′50″W
- Area: less than one acre
- Built: 1889
- Architect: Allan Conover and Lew F. Porter
- Architectural style: Richardsonian Romanesque
- NRHP reference No.: 02001572
- Added to NRHP: December 19, 2002

The Christian Dick Block is a historic commercial building located at 106 East Doty Street in Madison, Wisconsin. The building was constructed in 1889 for liquor wholesaler Christian Dick. The prominent Madison architectural firm of Conover & Porter designed the Richardsonian Romanesque style building; it is one of the city's earliest extant examples of both the firm's work and the style. The building was added to the National Register of Historic Places in 2002.

== History ==
Born in Cologne, Germany in 1845, Christian Dick immigrated to Madison in 1878 and established a wholesale liquor business. Dick purchased the triangular lot at the corner of King and East Doty Streets in March 1889 to be the new site of his business. He hired the architectural firm of Conover & Porter to plan the three-story building; while Dick had originally intended to build a two-story building, dance teacher F. W. Kehl convinced him to build the third floor and subsequently rented it as a studio. The building was finished later in the year; at the time, Madison's newspapers regarded it as a significant contribution to the city's commercial architecture. Dick ran his liquor business from the building's basement and leased the corner storefront to the Schlitz Brewery, which opened a saloon in the space; the second floor was used as a hotel until the 1920s.

The building was added to the National Register of Historic Places on December 19, 2002. Shortly before its nomination to the Register, the building was extensively restored; in the restoration process, it was connected to the neighboring E. W. Eddy Block.

== Architecture ==
The Madison architectural firm of Allan Darst Conover and Lew Foster Porter designed the Dick Block. The two architects became partners in the mid-1880s, while Conover was a professor and Porter a student at the University of Wisconsin–Madison. Until the firm broke up in 1899, the two were among Madison's most prolific architects, designing over 50 public buildings and around 100 residences. The firm tended to use the Queen Anne and Shingle styles for homes and the Richardsonian Romanesque for larger buildings, including the Dick Block; both were popular styles in the late nineteenth century. Many of the firm's works have since been demolished, and the Dick Block is one of its oldest surviving designs.

Built on a triangular plot of land, the building is roughly lozenge-shaped with a flatiron appearance from the front. Its Richardsonian Romanesque design is one of the oldest extant examples of the style in Madison; as many of the city's Richardsonian Romanesque buildings were later demolished, it is also one of the best-preserved. The building has a cream-colored brick exterior and a stone foundation; a buttress and groupings of windows are used to visually separate the building into its functional partitions. A conical tower marks the front corner of the building; the original main entrance is below the tower and is flanked by two sets of stone columns, one of the building's most prominent Romanesque features. The upper-story windows are topped by brick arches, a common Romanesque element; the second-story windows have segmental arches, which the third-story windows have round arches.
