= Security Savings Bank Building =

- Security Savings Bank
- U.S. National Register of Historic Places
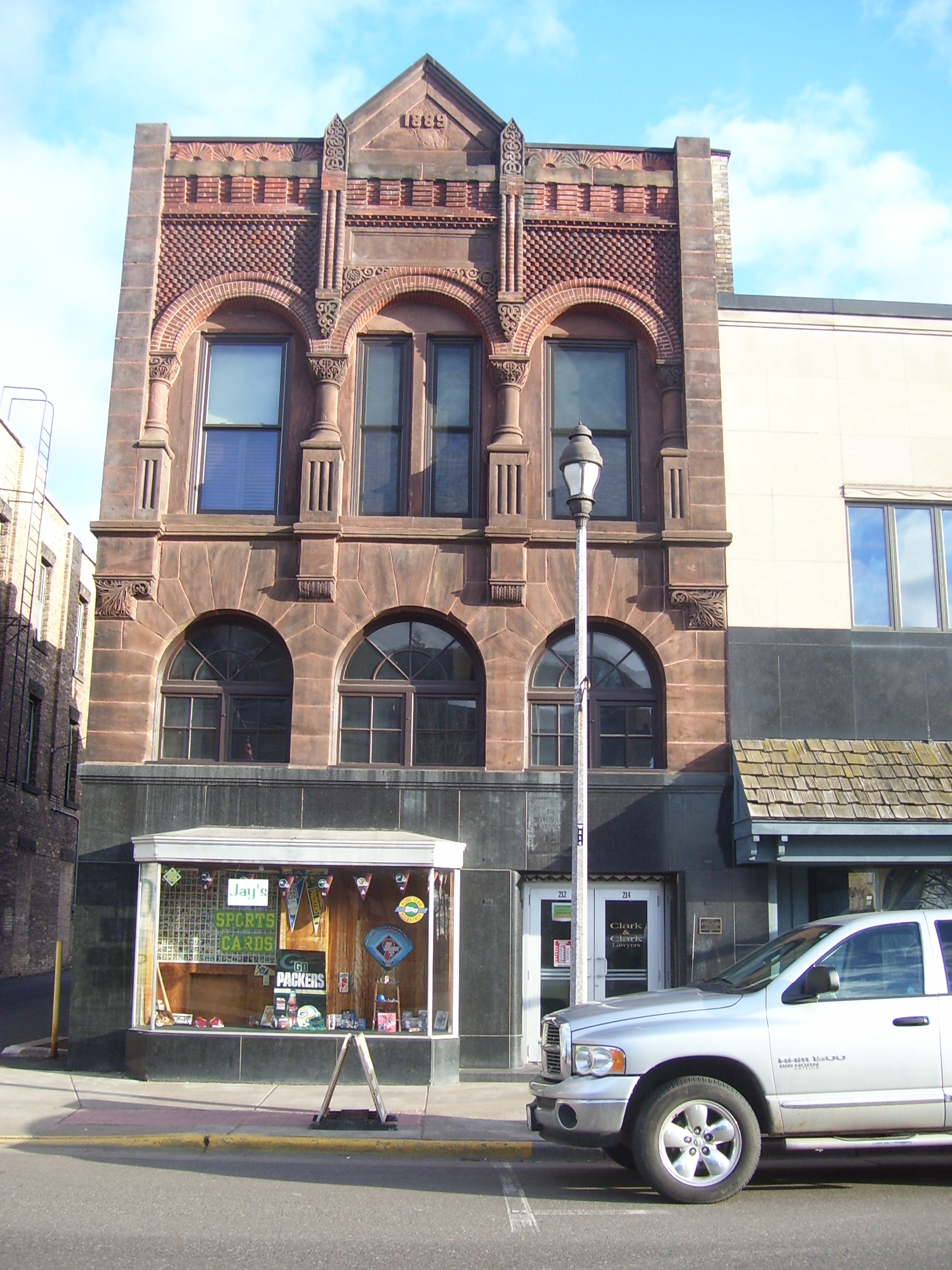
- Location: 212 West Main Street; Ashland, Wisconsin
- Coordinates: 46°35′25.5″N 90°53′6″W
- Built: 1889
- Architect: Allan Conover and Lew F. Porter
- MPS: Security Savings Bank
- NRHP reference No.: 74000055
- Added to NRHP: December 27, 1974

The Security Savings Bank, also known as the Appleyard Building, is a historic building in Ashland, Wisconsin, United States. In 1974, it was added to the National Register of Historic Places. It was designed in the Richardsonian Romanesque Style by the architectural firm Conover and Porter, of Madison.

The building is a contributing resource within the West Second Street Historic District, of downtown Ashland.

The two-story commercial building features brick and brownstone arches as the primary motif on both floors. The first floor was altered in 1935, when polished black granite was applied to the front exterior, with material provided by the American Black Granite Company.

Today, the building is located directly next door to the Ashland Historical Society Museum.

== See also ==
- National Register of Historic Places listings in Ashland County, Wisconsin
