= Madison Candy Company =

- U.S. National Register of Historic Places
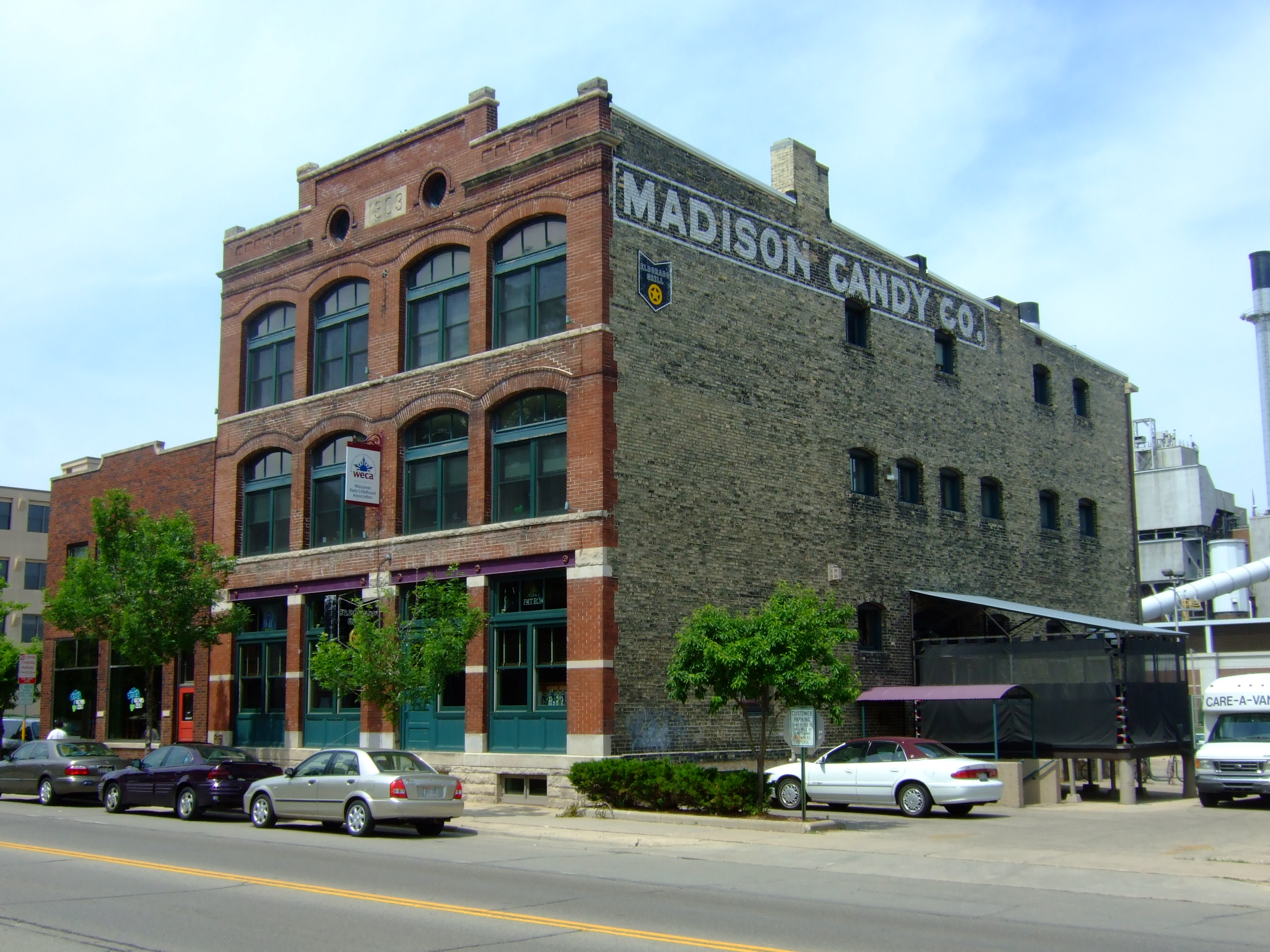
- Madison Candy Company
- Location: 744 Williamson St. Madison, Wisconsin
- Coordinates: 43.078083°N 89.371989°W
- Built: 1903
- Architect: John Nader
- NRHP reference No.: 97000294
- Added to NRHP: March 28, 1997

The Madison Candy Company is a candy factory built in 1903 a half mile east of the capitol in Madison, Wisconsin. In 1997 it was added to the National Register of Historic Places.

== History ==
Industry developed rather slowly in Madison. Many early jobs were in government and education and some city leaders were reluctant to dirty their clean city with smokestacks and workers' tenements. The city also was short on skilled labor, and rail freight rates made shipping to and from inland cities like Madison more expensive than lake-side cities like Milwaukee. Nevertheless, views changed and by the 1890s the Madison Businessman's Association was trying to attract industry, as long as it was "high grade" and concentrated in the factory district on the east side.

The Madison Candy Company was started by Joseph E. Kleiner in 1899, initially operating at 623 Williamson Street in one of the shops in the long Machinery Row block. In 1903 the company built a new factory, the subject of this article, nearby at 744 Williamson Street.

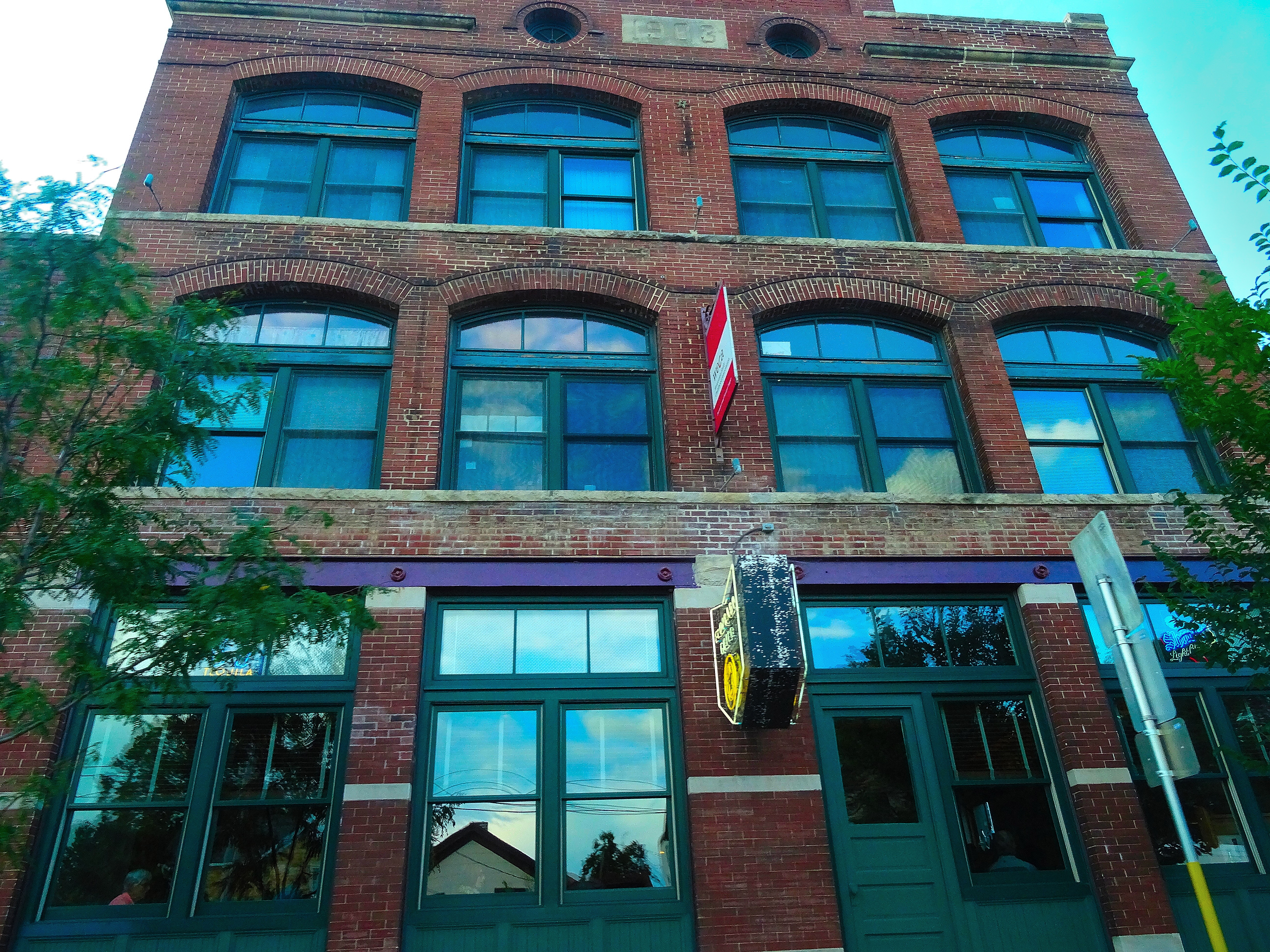

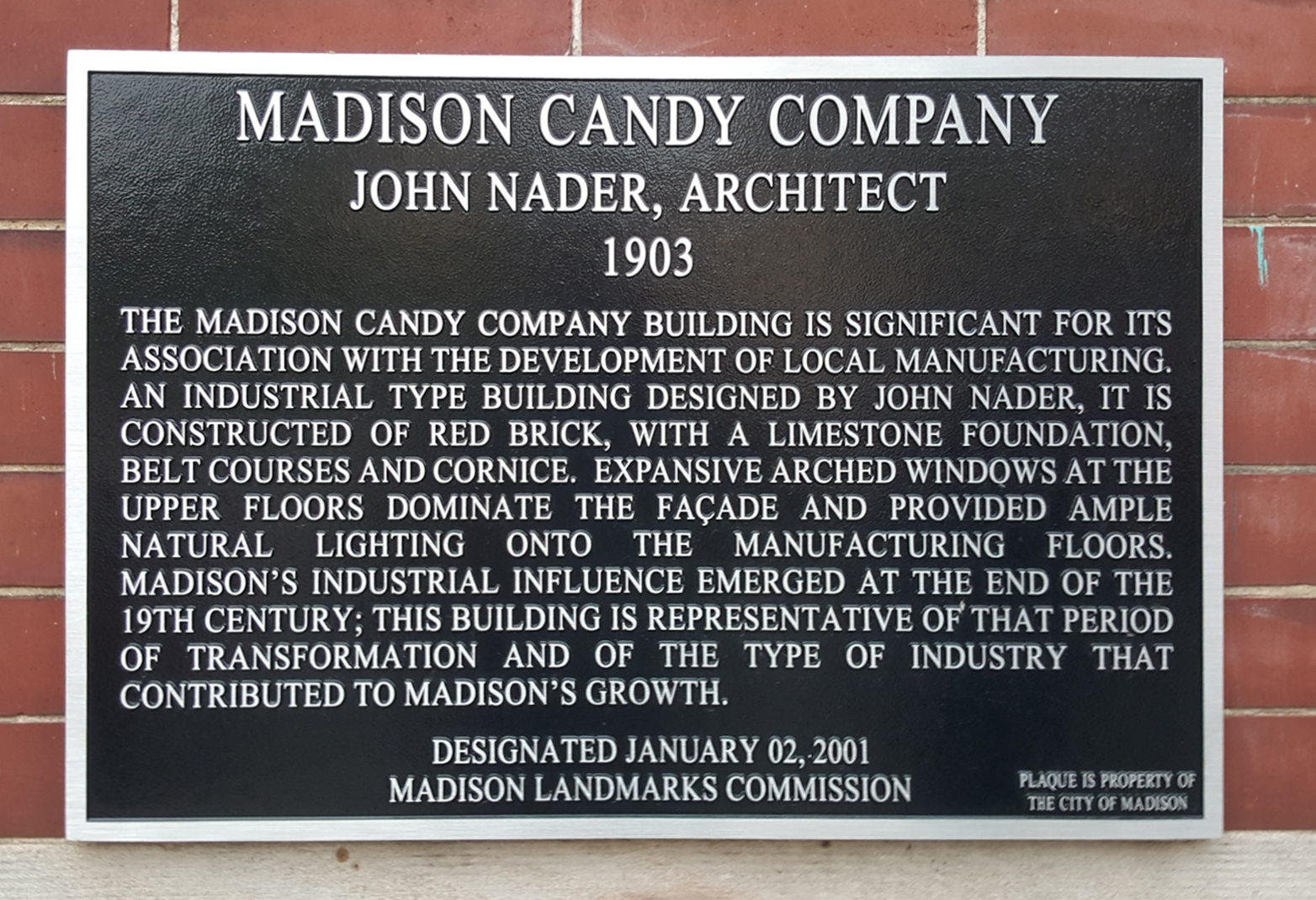
Landmark plaque

John Nader, a Madison architect and engineer, designed the new factory with a red brick front, three stories with a parapet at the top of the front, behind which a shed roof slopes to the back. The front is divided into four bays. On the first story the windows are all rectangular, with concrete trimming the columns between the bays. On the second and third floor, each window has a low-arched top. The large windows admitted light into the work areas. The cornice is stepped, with a datestone saying "1903" in the middle and a circular window on each side. The street level story has been modified somewhat, but the front above that is largely as originally built.

The original candy-making equipment has long been removed from the factory, but an article in the Wisconsin State Journal in 1903 tells a bit of what went on there:

It is interesting to spend an hour at the factory watching the process of candy making, from the time the white, granular sugar leaves the barrell till the finished product - the delicate, appetizing, finished chocolate creams are packed away in boxes of pretty design. In the manufacture of candies the Company requires sugar by the carload.

That same article described Madison Candy Co. as manufacturing a "general line of Candies, and [it] does a jobbing business in Crackers, Cigars, Cheese and Nuts." It goes on:

The leading thing in the candy world just now is Chocolate Creams and of this the Madison Candy Company makes an excellent article which is rapidly growing in popularity. It also makes a fine line of Mixed Candies and a large line of novelties in sweets. The Company's output is marketed in all parts of Wisconsin.

Along with Joseph Kleiner, the Prendergast family was heavily involved in the company. James J. Prendergast was the manager and VP. His brother Thomas was the Secretary, his sister Mary was the "forelady," and his brother Charles was probably a travelling salesman for the company. The Prendergast parents had immigrated from Ireland in 1847, settling in Dodge County. James worked for a steam bakery in Watertown until around 1900, when that bakery was bought by the National Biscuit Company, which may have caused their move to Madison.

The Candy Company operated in the building until 1927. In 1935 the Wisconsin Farm Bureau moved in, then Ela Welding Supplies in 1946. In 1950, the building underwent remodeling.

The site was designated a landmark by the Madison Landmarks Commission in 2001, and is also listed on the Wisconsin State Register of Historic Places. The NRHP nomination considers the Candy Company building one of the few intact representatives of the development of industry in Madison in the 1900s. It is also Madison's best example of a historic confectionary facility, and its location in the east-side industrial district is a reminder of the anti-industry attitudes that some in Madison once held. The building is also a good example of industrial design and the work of local designer John Nader.

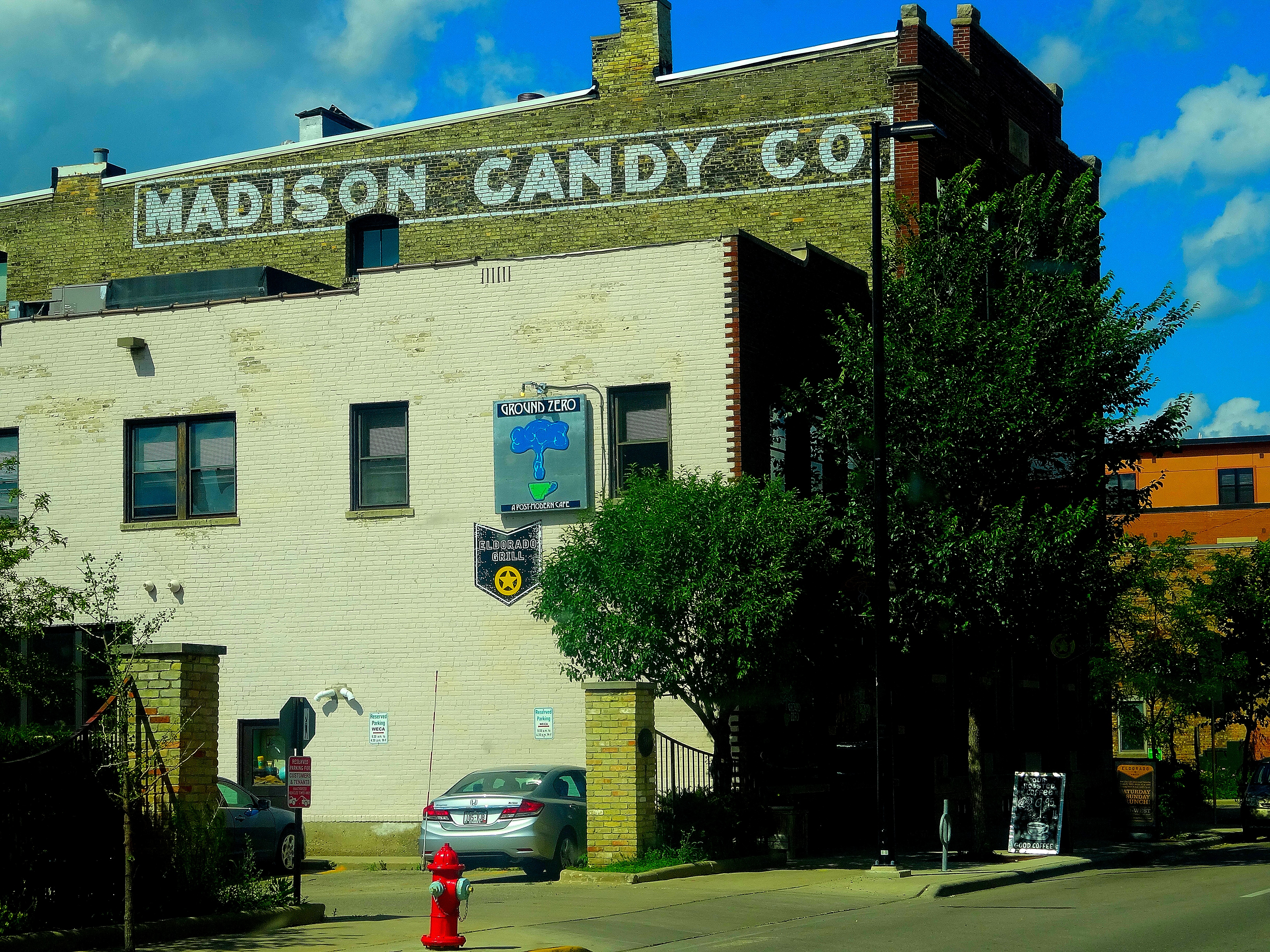
