= University of Wisconsin Science Hall =

- U.S. National Register of Historic Places
- U.S. National Historic Landmark
- U.S. Historic district – Contributing property
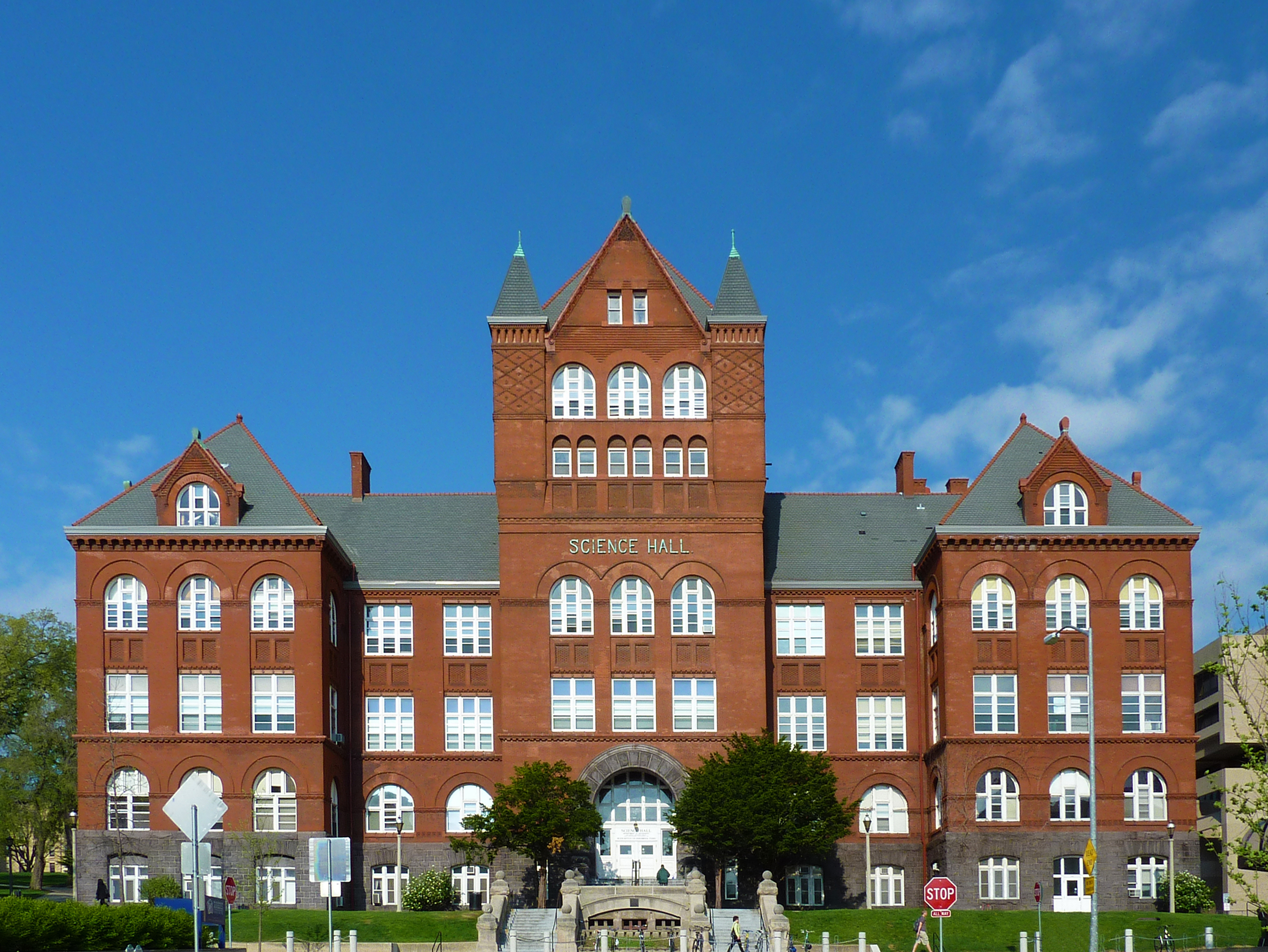

- Location within Wisconsin Location within the United States
- Location: 550 N. Park St., Madison, Wisconsin
- Coordinates: 43°4′33″N 89°24′4″W
- Built: 1888
- Architect: Henry C. Koch, Allan Conover
- Architectural style: Romanesque
- Part of: Bascom Hill Historic District (ID74000065)
- NRHP reference No.: 93001616

Significant dates
- Added to NRHP: November 4, 1993
- Designated NHL: November 4, 1993

University of Wisconsin Science Hall is a building on the campus of the University of Wisconsin–Madison. It is significant for its association with Charles R. Van Hise, "who led the Department of Mineralogy and Geology to national prominence" and then served as president of the university. The building was constructed in 1888. It was declared a National Historic Landmark in 1993.

== Architecture ==
Science Hall is a U-shaped, three story building built in a Romanesque Revival motif. It was designed by Milwaukee architect Henry C. Koch and was later altered during construction by Allan D. Conover, a professor of civil engineering at the school. Rhyolite ashlar provides a bright red exterior. The main facade of the building is 205 feet (62 m) long and overlooks Park Street. It features a five-story tower with a hipped roof. Wings stretch to the west from the north and south. There are four three-story towers on each corner of the wings. A small, three-story round tower is found on each courtyard side of the two wings on the western extremity. Roofs were originally slate, but were replaced with asphalt shingles in 1992. A terra cotta hip roll decorates the towers below the roofs. There are sixteen brick chimneys throughout the building, all featuring a corbelled top.

== History ==
When completed in 1888, Science Hall was one of three instructional facilities at the University of Wisconsin. It originally hosted courses in geology, geography, physics, zoology, limnology, botany, anatomy, bacteriology, and medicine. The building helped to cement the university as one of the nation's leading geology schools. Science Hall was home to the first American courses in sedimentation, oceanography, and engineering geology. This was due in large part to its leading geologist, Charles R. Van Hise.

Other prominent scientists associated with the building are Van Hise's mentor, geologist Roland Irving, geologist Charles Leith, geologist Eliot Blackwelder, geologist Warren J. Mead, geologist William H. Twenhofel, geographer Arthur H. Robinson, geographer Lawrence Martin, geographer Yi-Fu Tuan, geomorphologist Armin K. Lobeck, geographer Vernor C. Finch, physicist Benjamin W. Snow, physicist Robert W. Wood, physicist Augustus Trowbridge, physicist Charles Mendenhall, physicist Edward Bennet, limnologist Edwin Birge, and anatomist Charles Russell Bardeen. In this building H.L. Russell carried out research that eventually led to the elimination of tuberculosis in U.S. dairy cattle. And from this building physicist Earle M. Terry and his students transmitted the first audio from their pioneering radio transmitter 9XM in 1917.

== Images ==
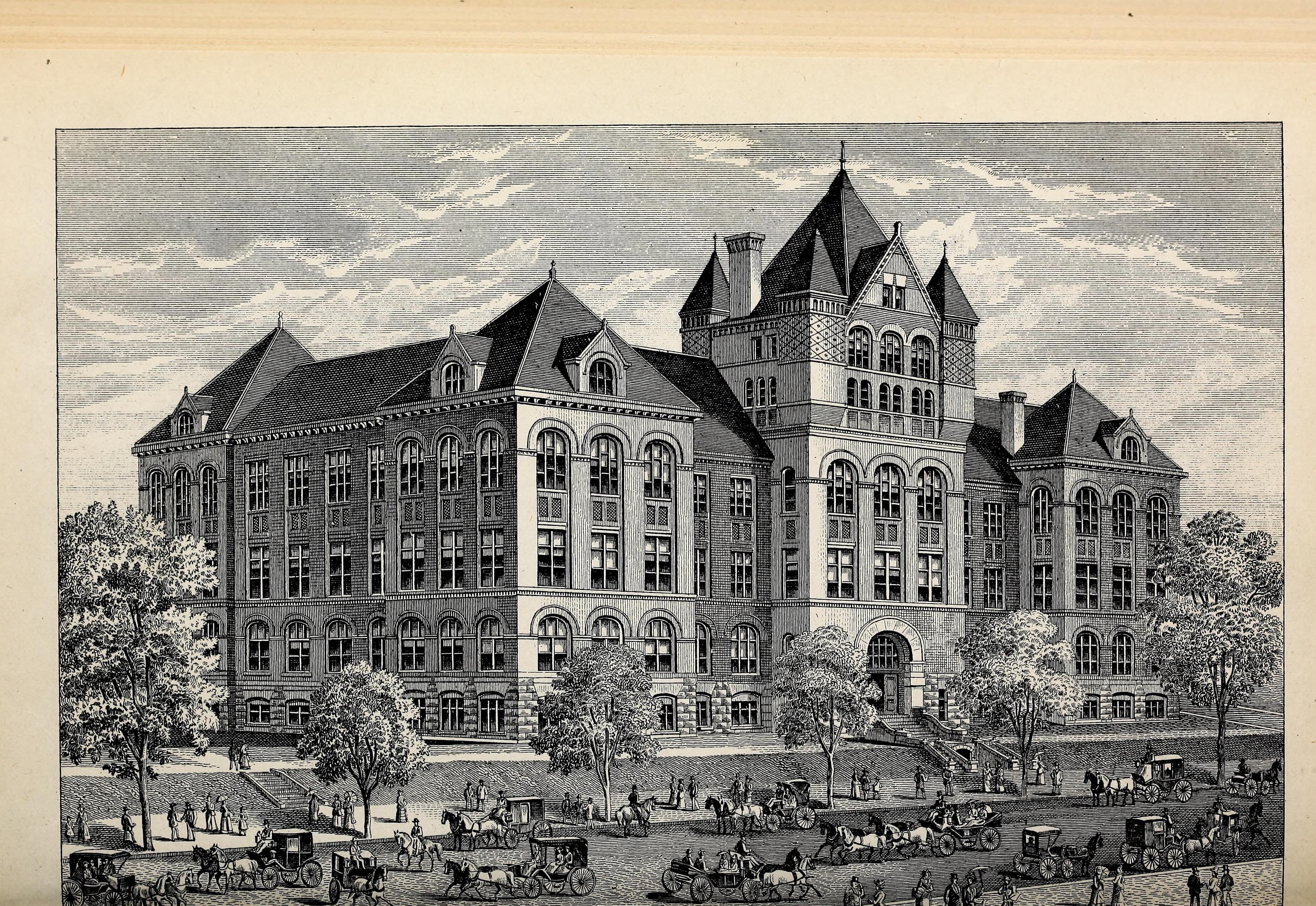
from the 1893 Blue Book

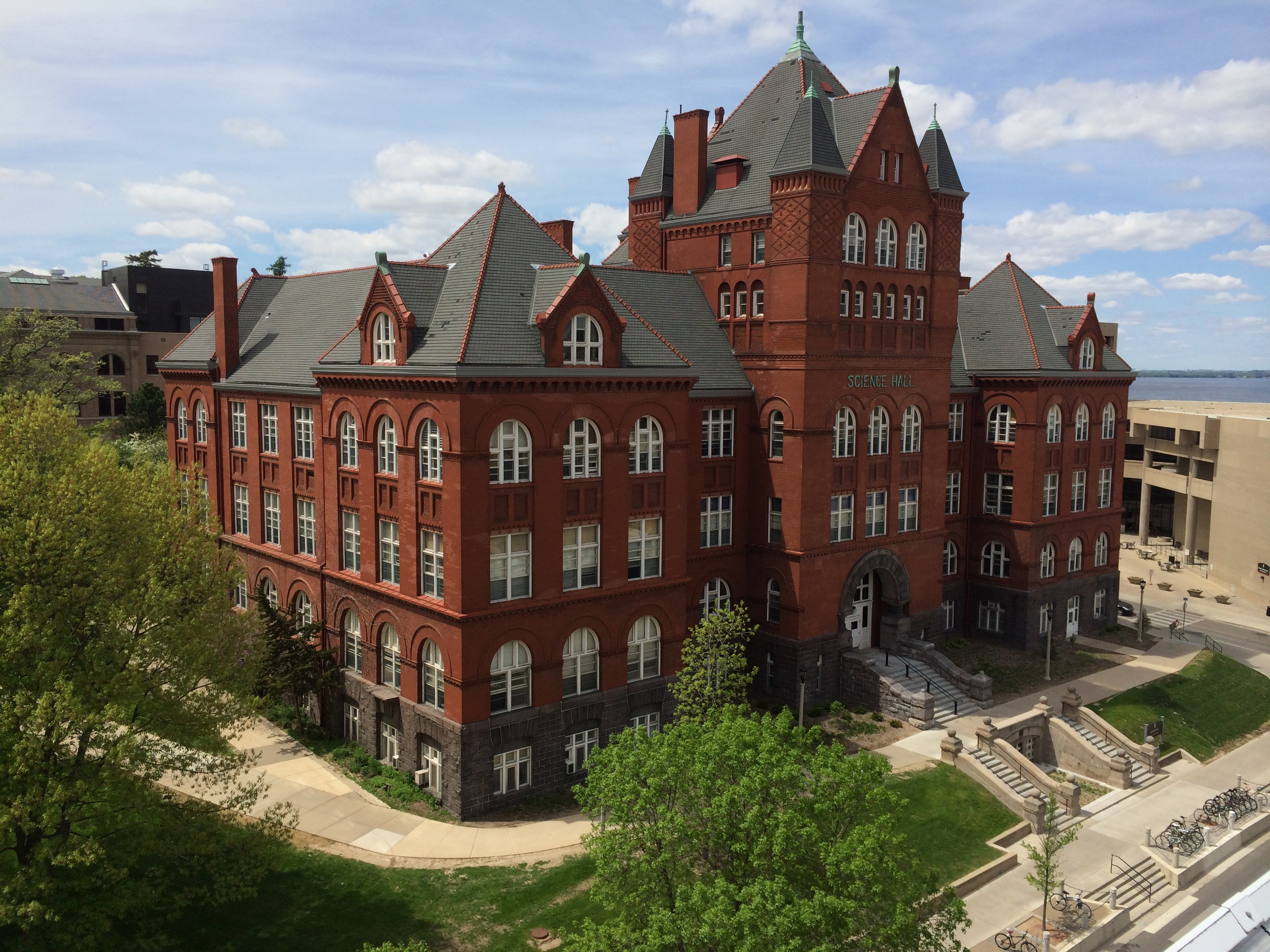
2014

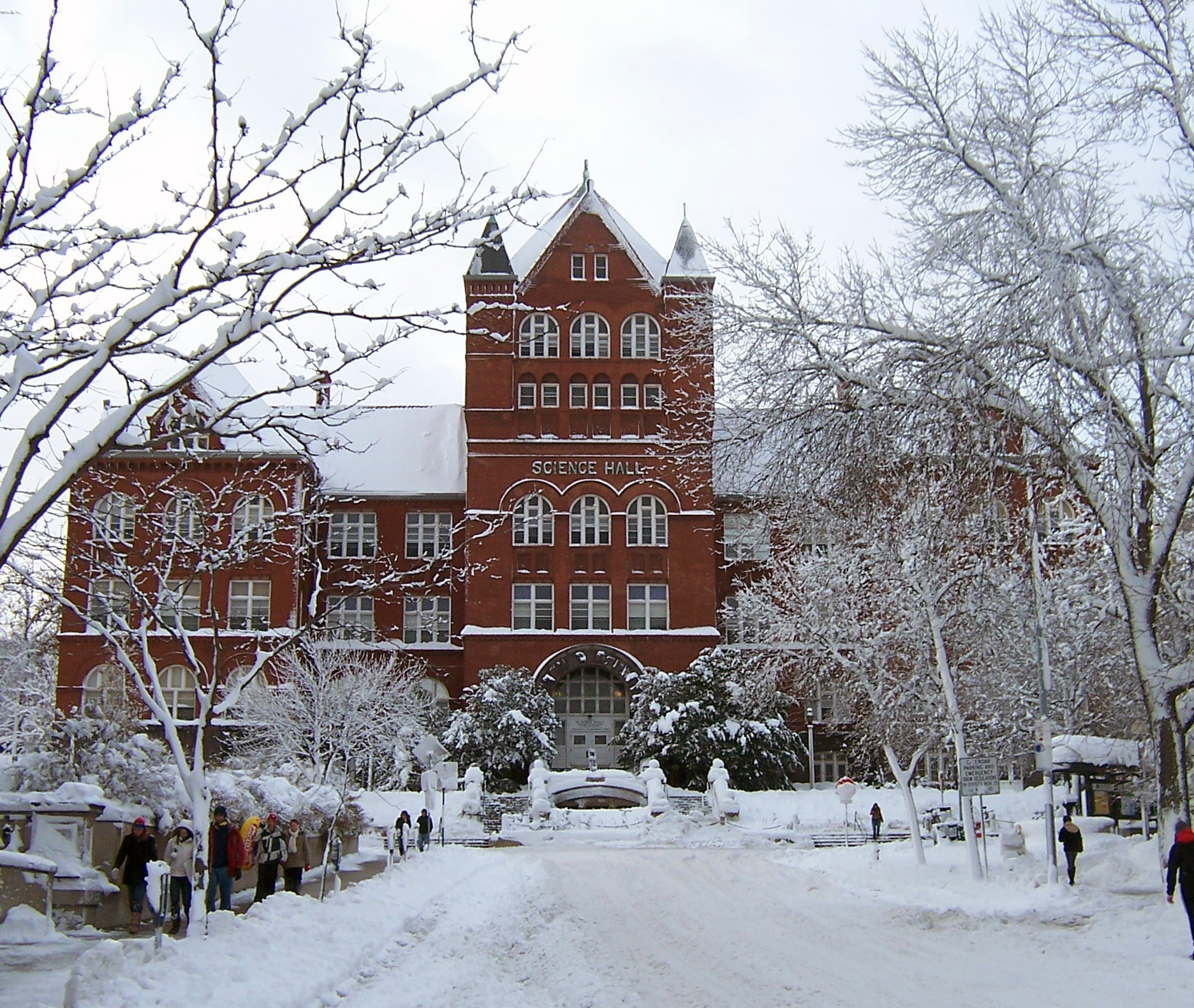
Science Hall, December 2009

== See also ==
- List of National Historic Landmarks in Wisconsin
- National Register of Historic Places listings in Madison, Wisconsin
