= Allan Conover =

Wisconsin architect (1854-1929)

Allan Darst Conover
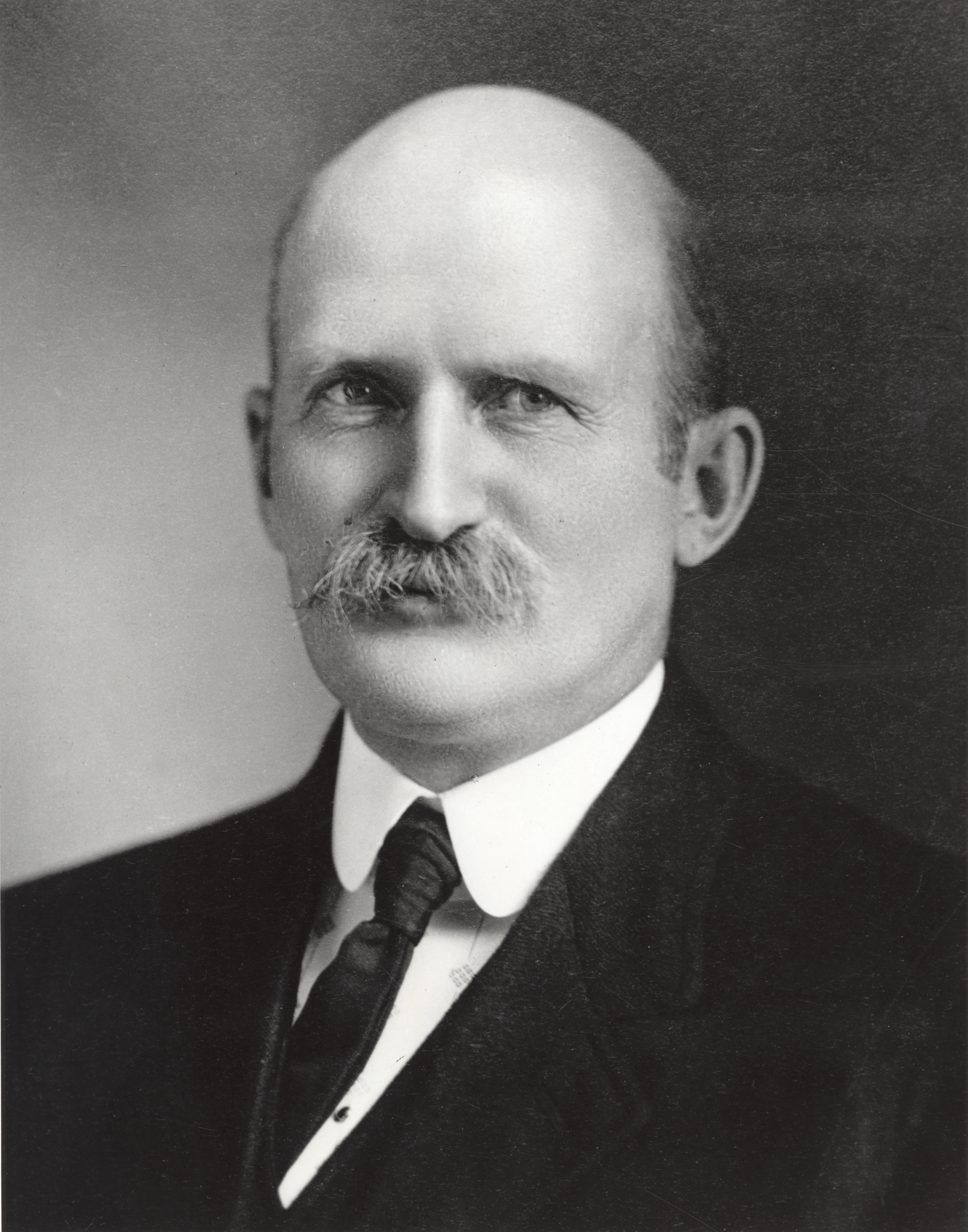
- Conover c.1900
- Born: Allan Darst Conover; September 9, 1854; Madison, Wisconsin, U.S.
- Died: May 23, 1929 (aged 74); Madison, Wisconsin, U.S.
- Education: University of Wisconsin-Madison
- Occupation: Architect
- Spouse: Ella Elizabeth Stone
- Buildings: Christian Dick Block; University of Wisconsin Armory and Gymnasium; University of Wisconsin Science Hall; Machinery Row; Security Savings Bank Building

Allan Darst Conover (September 9, 1854 - May 23, 1929), also spelled as Alan Conover, was an American architect and civil engineer from Wisconsin. During his career Conover was responsible for building a number of notable buildings in Wisconsin. Conover was the employer and longtime business partner of Lew F. Porter, together they established the architectural firm Conover & Porter which constructed a variety of notable buildings around Madison, Wisconsin. Conover, along with Porter, were both mentors of Frank Lloyd Wright, who worked as an apprentice for their firm.

== Early life ==
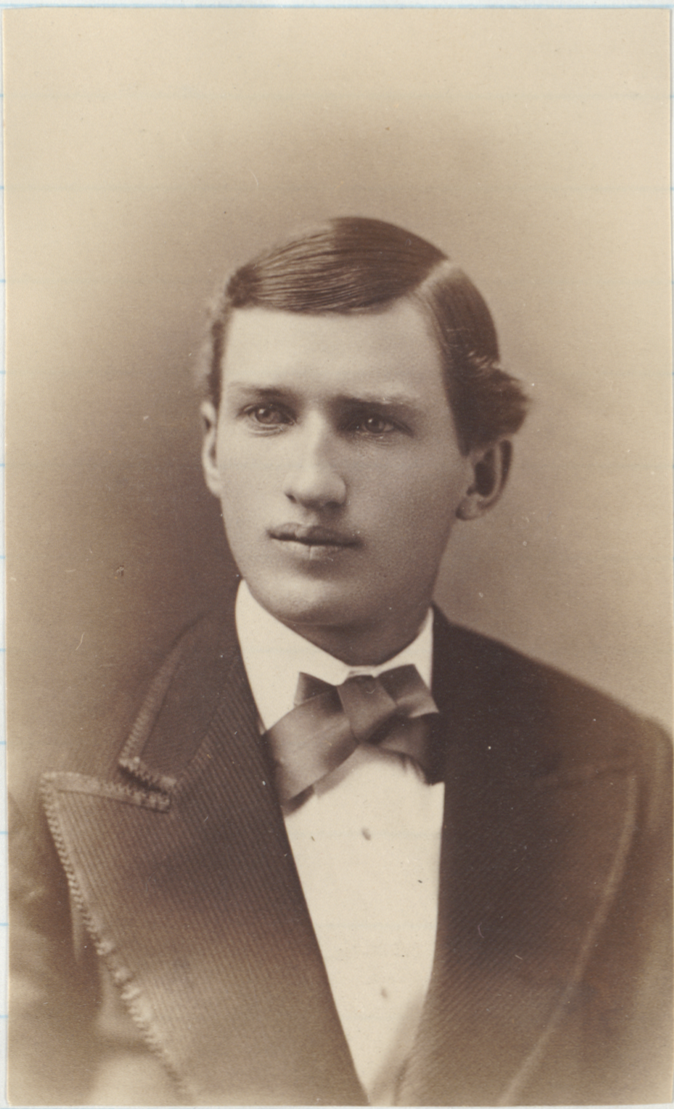
Conover's graduation photograph for the University of Wisconsin-Madison's class of 1874

Allan Darst Conover was born on September 9, 1854 in Madison, Wisconsin to parents Obediah Milton Conover and Julia Ann Darst (1827-1863). His family was of Dutch heritage. Conover's father Obediah was the editor of The Northwestern Journal of Education, Science and General Literature, as well as being a university professor. Obediah was also the official reporter of the Wisconsin Supreme Court. Conover studied civil engineering and architecture at the University of Wisconsin–Madison and graduated in 1874 with a Bachelors degree in civil engineering (BCE).

== Career ==
Conover began his career in civil engineering and architecture in 1875 working for the Wisconsin government on the Wisconsin River. From 1877 to 1878 Conover was engaged in general engineer in Madison before becoming the professor of civil engineering and mathematics for the University of Wisconsin-Madison from 1878 to 1879. From 1882 to 1884 Conover served as the city surveyor of Madison along with working as a topographer for the State Geological Society.

Beginning in 1885 Conover hired one of his previous students, Lew F. Porter as a business partner and created the architectural and engineering firm Conover & Porter. Together the two architects built a variety of structures in and around Madison and Dane County, Wisconsin. Conover's first major projects as a general contractor was building the University of Wisconsin Science Hall in 1885. A fire the previous year in 1884 destroyed much of the original hall. During this time Conover and Porter hired several apprentices, among them were Frank Lloyd Wright who worked with their firm for two years from 1885 to 1887 as a junior draftsman. According to William Allin Storrer, author of The Architecture of Frank Lloyd Wright: A Complete Catalog, Conover was not always pleased with Wright's work as a junior draftsman and often critiqued him.

== Personal life and death ==
Conover married Ella Elizabeth Stone, originally from Chicago, on June 23, 1881. They did not have children, and Mrs. Conover predeceased her husband. Conover died on May 23, 1929 in Madison, Wisconsin after a brief illness.

== Partial list of works ==
- The University of Wisconsin Science Hall in Madison, Wisconsin.
- The Second Ward School in Baraboo, Wisconsin.
- The South School in Stoughton, Wisconsin.
- The Security Savings Bank Building in Ashland, Wisconsin.
- The Christian Dick Block in Madison.
- The Antigo Public Library in Antigo, Wisconsin.
- The Agricultural Dean's House in Madison.
- The University of Wisconsin Armory and Gymnasium in Madison.
- Machinery Row in Madison.

== Gallery ==
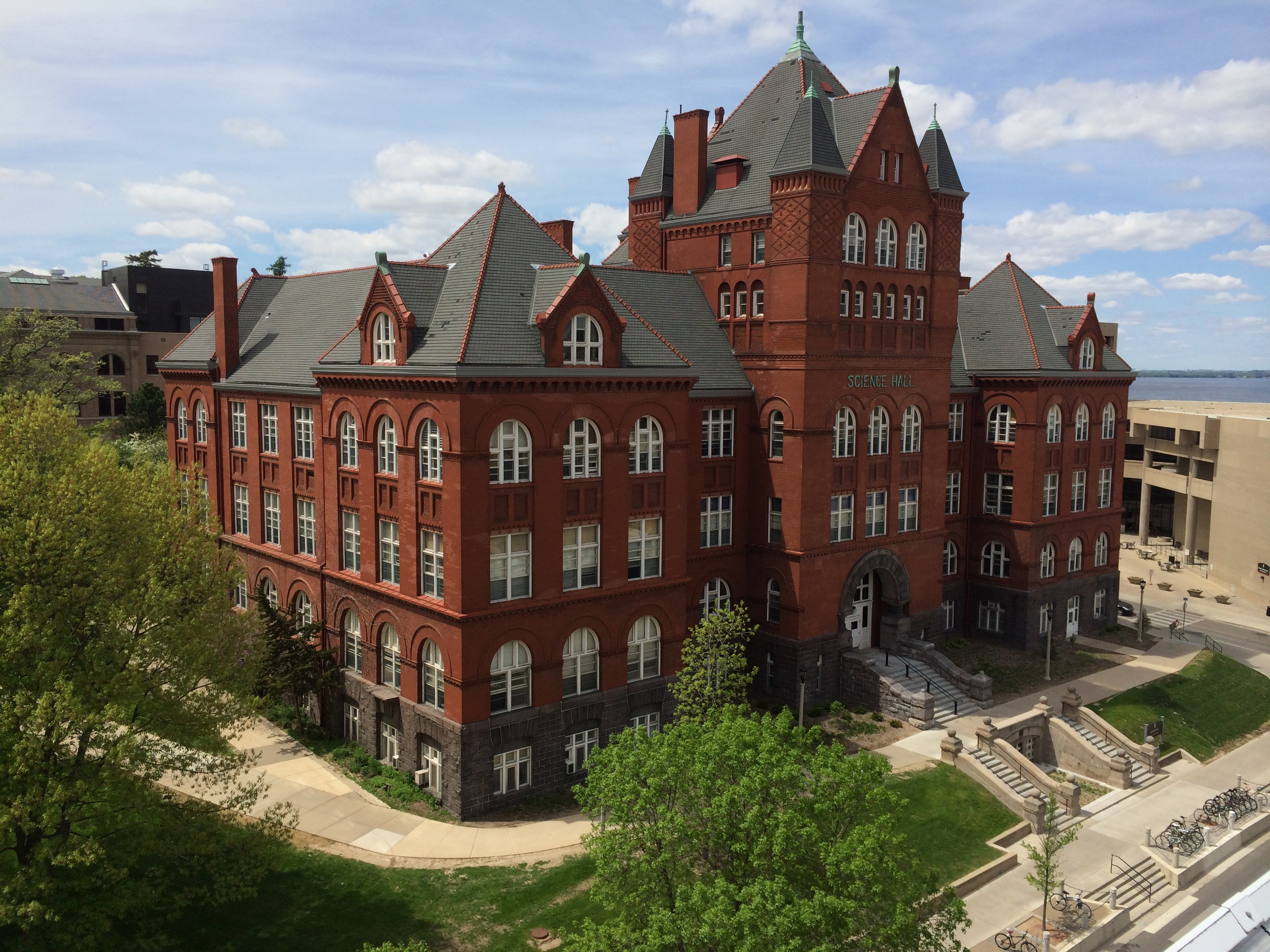
University of Wisconsin Science Hall (1885-1888)

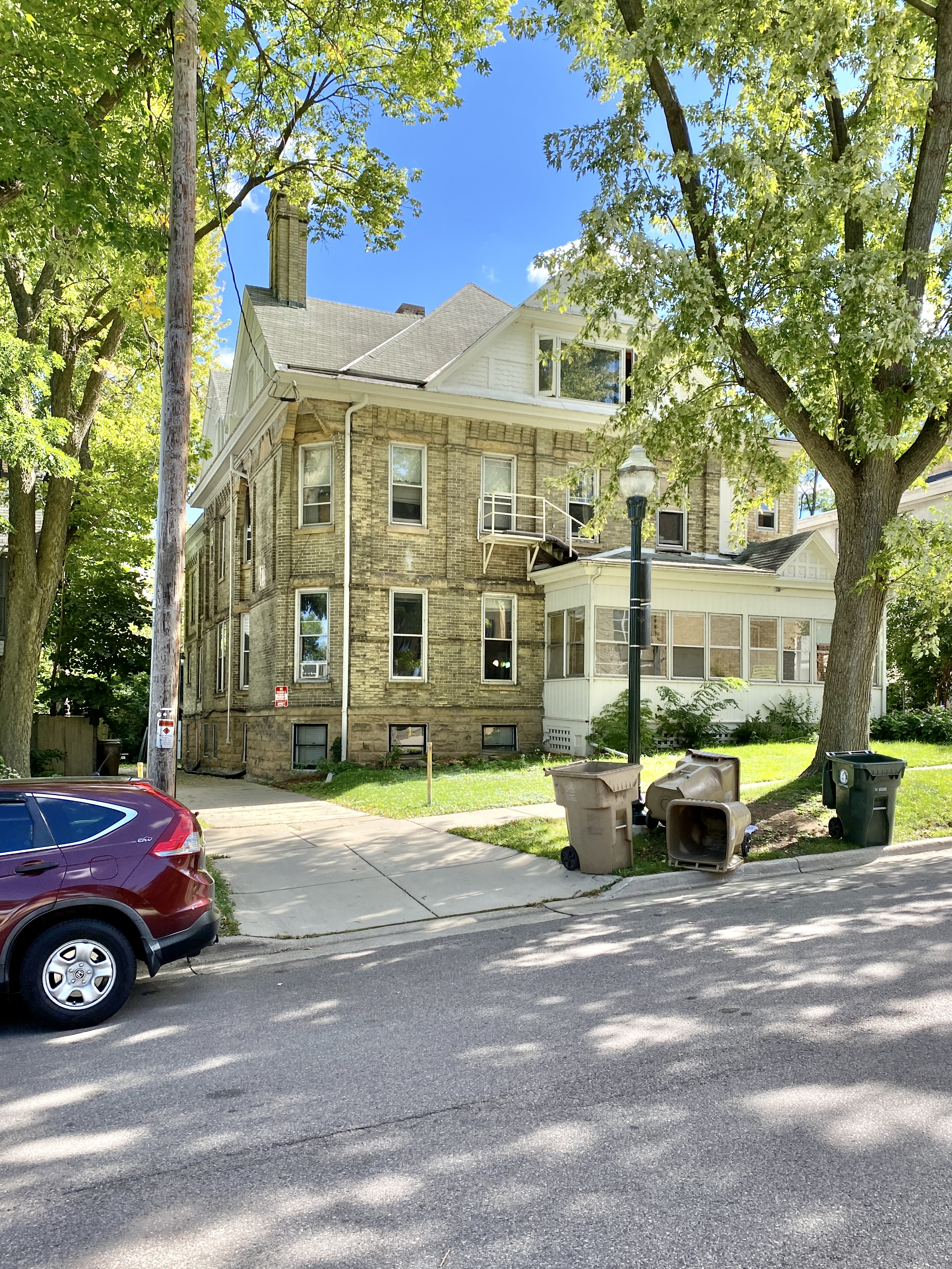
Fred and Annie Brown House at the Mansion Hill Historic District (1888)

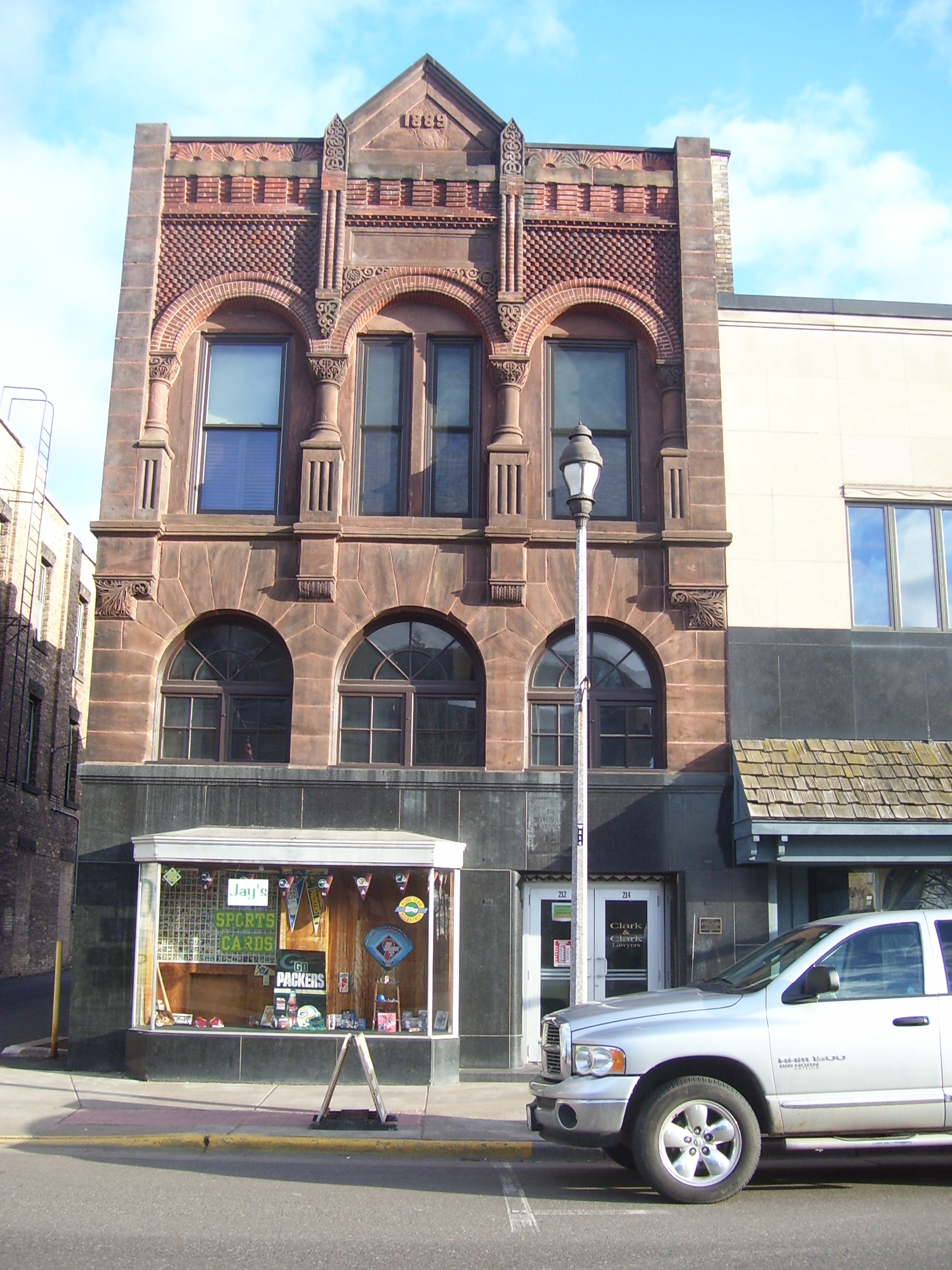
Security Savings Bank (1889)

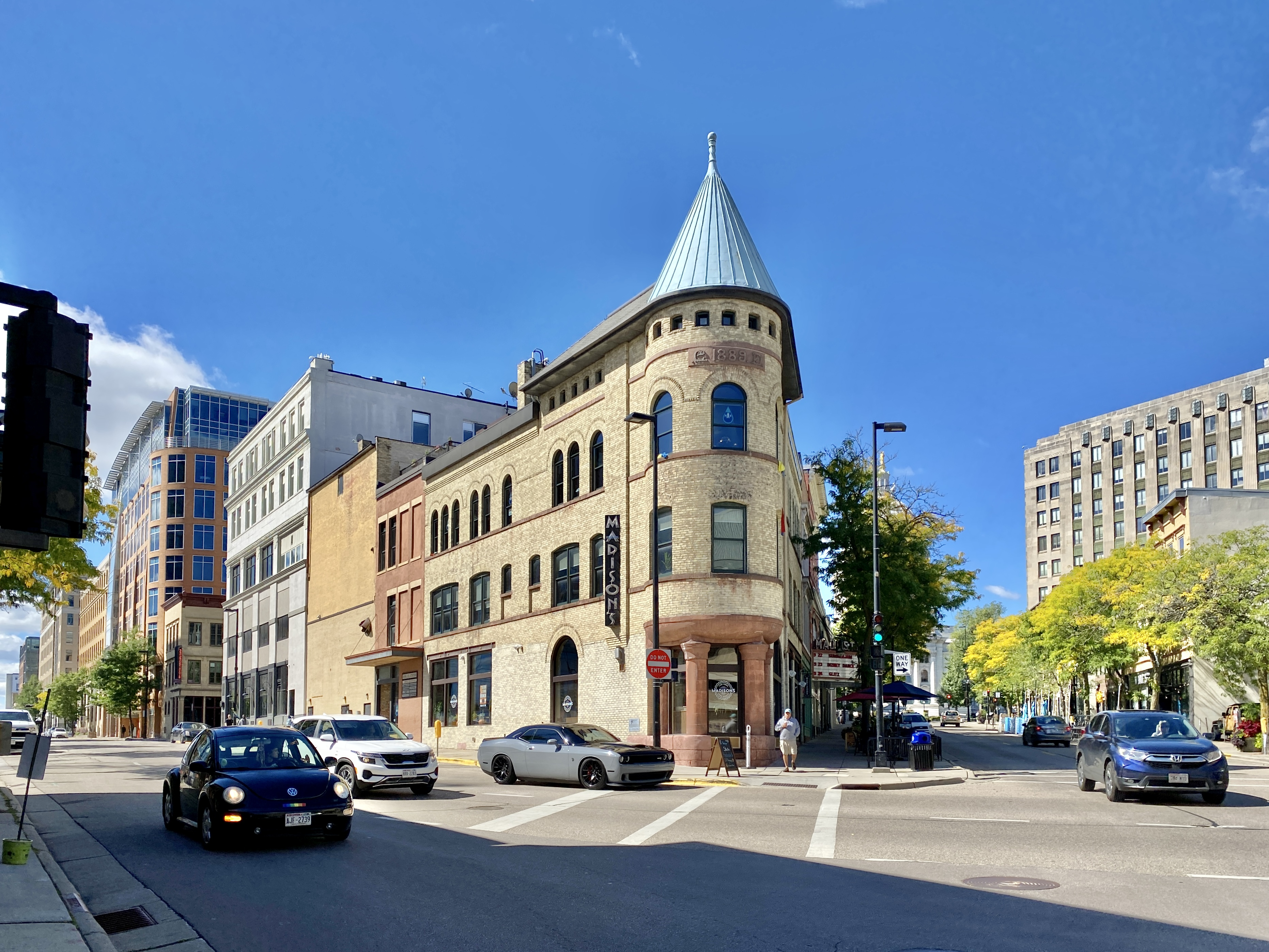
Christian Dick Block (1889)

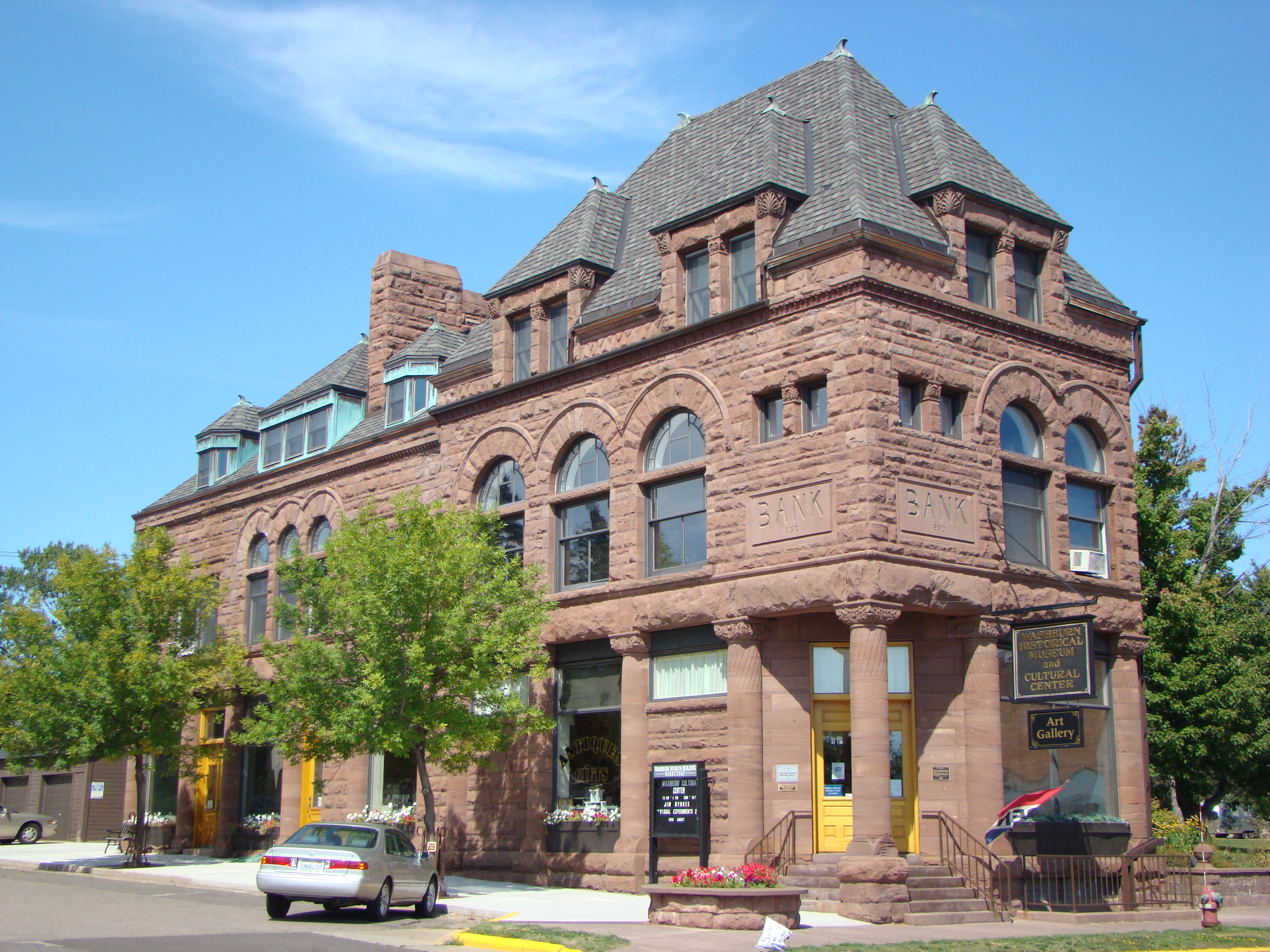
Bank of Washburn (1890)

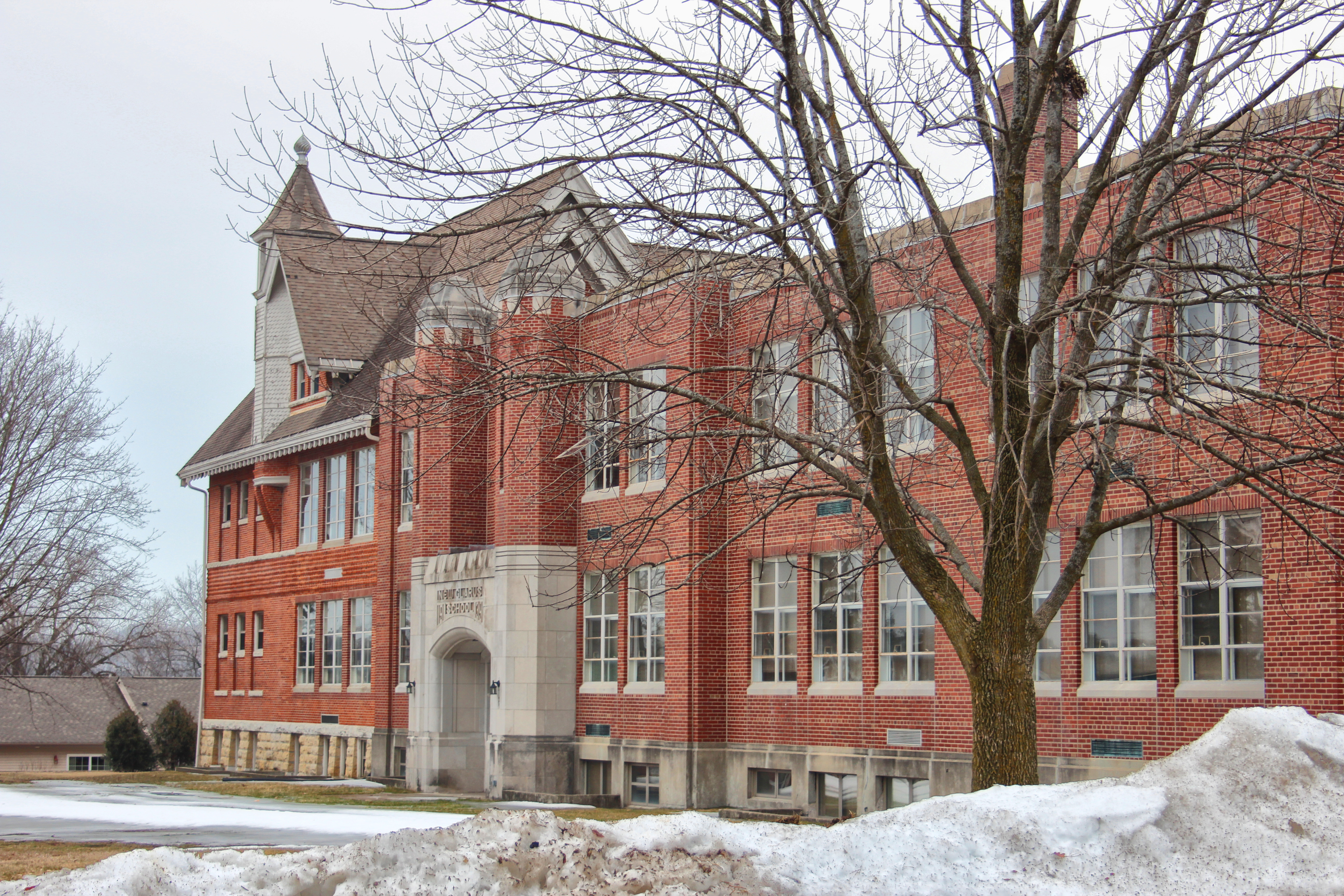
New Glarus Public School and High School (1890's)

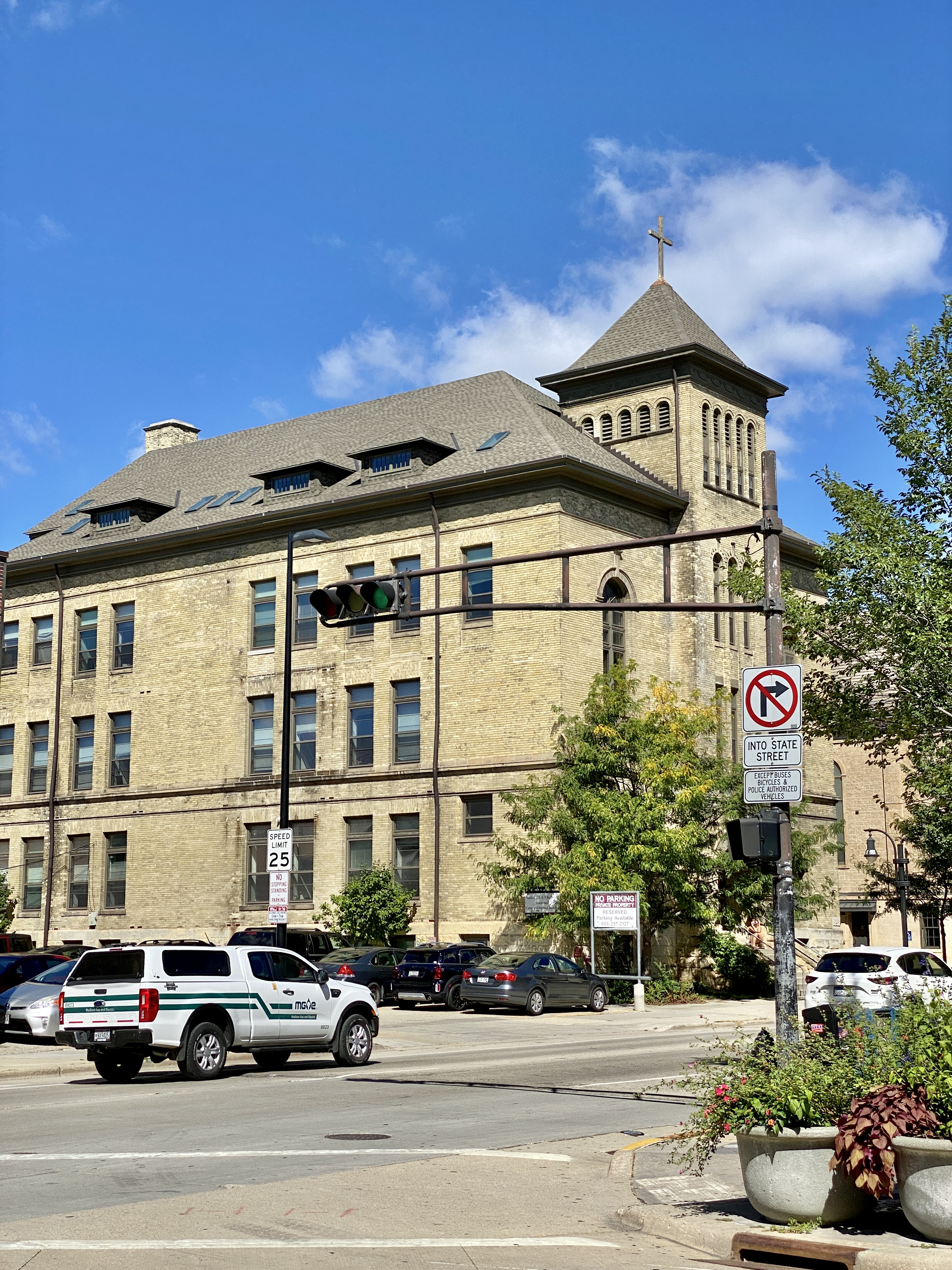
Holy Redeemer Parochial School (1892)

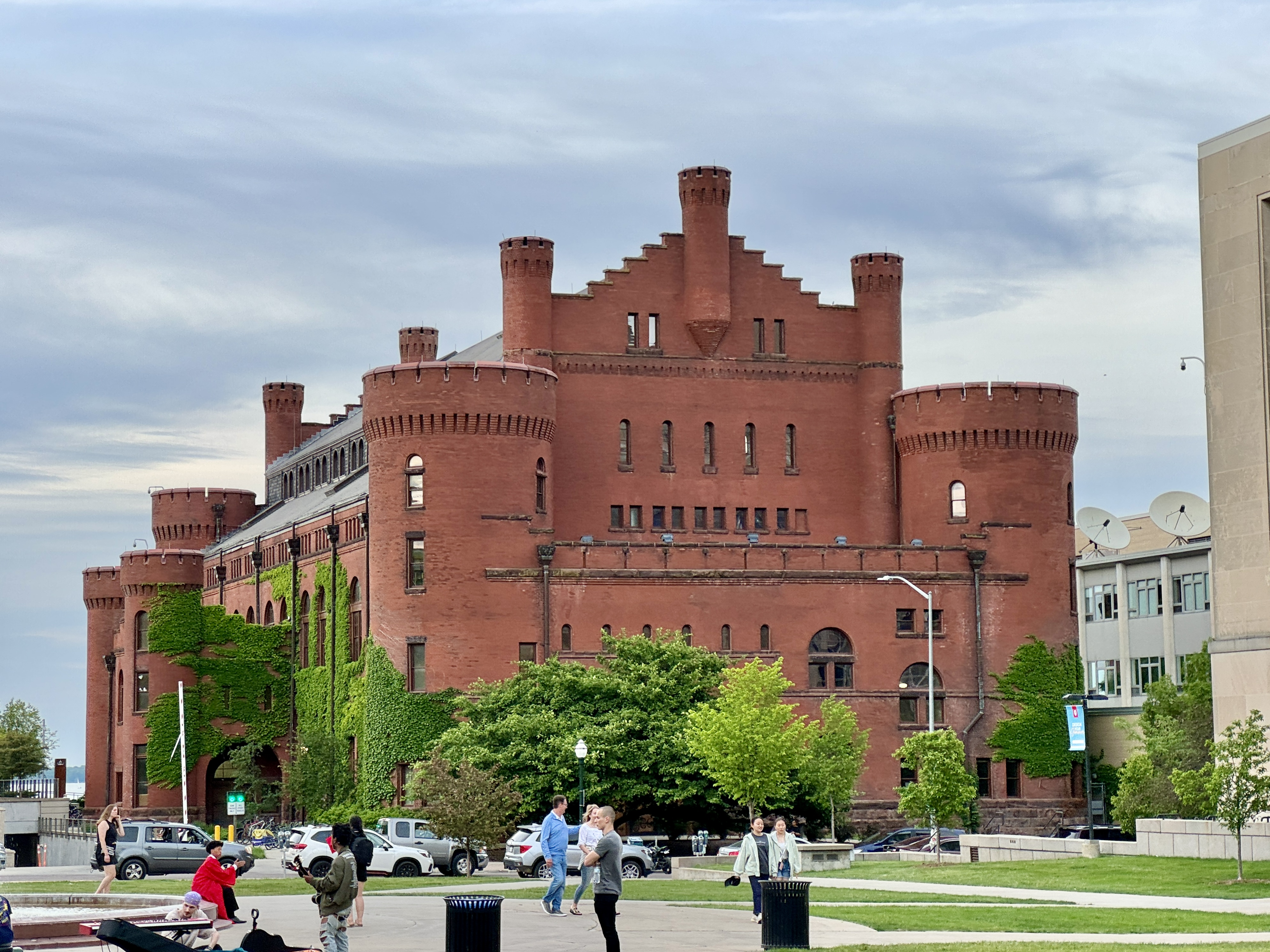
University of Wisconsin Armory and Gymnasium (1894)

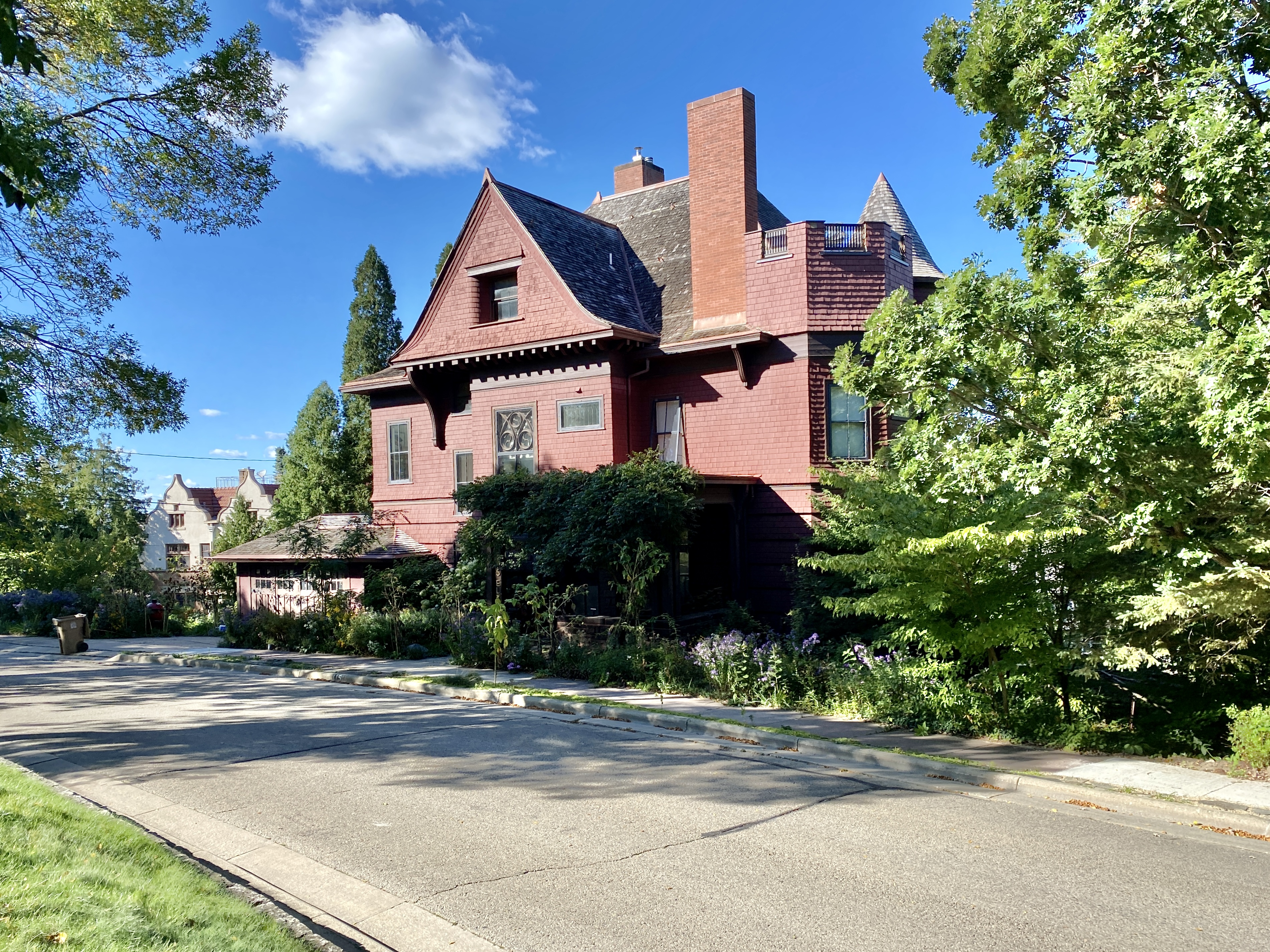
Charles E. Buell House (1894)

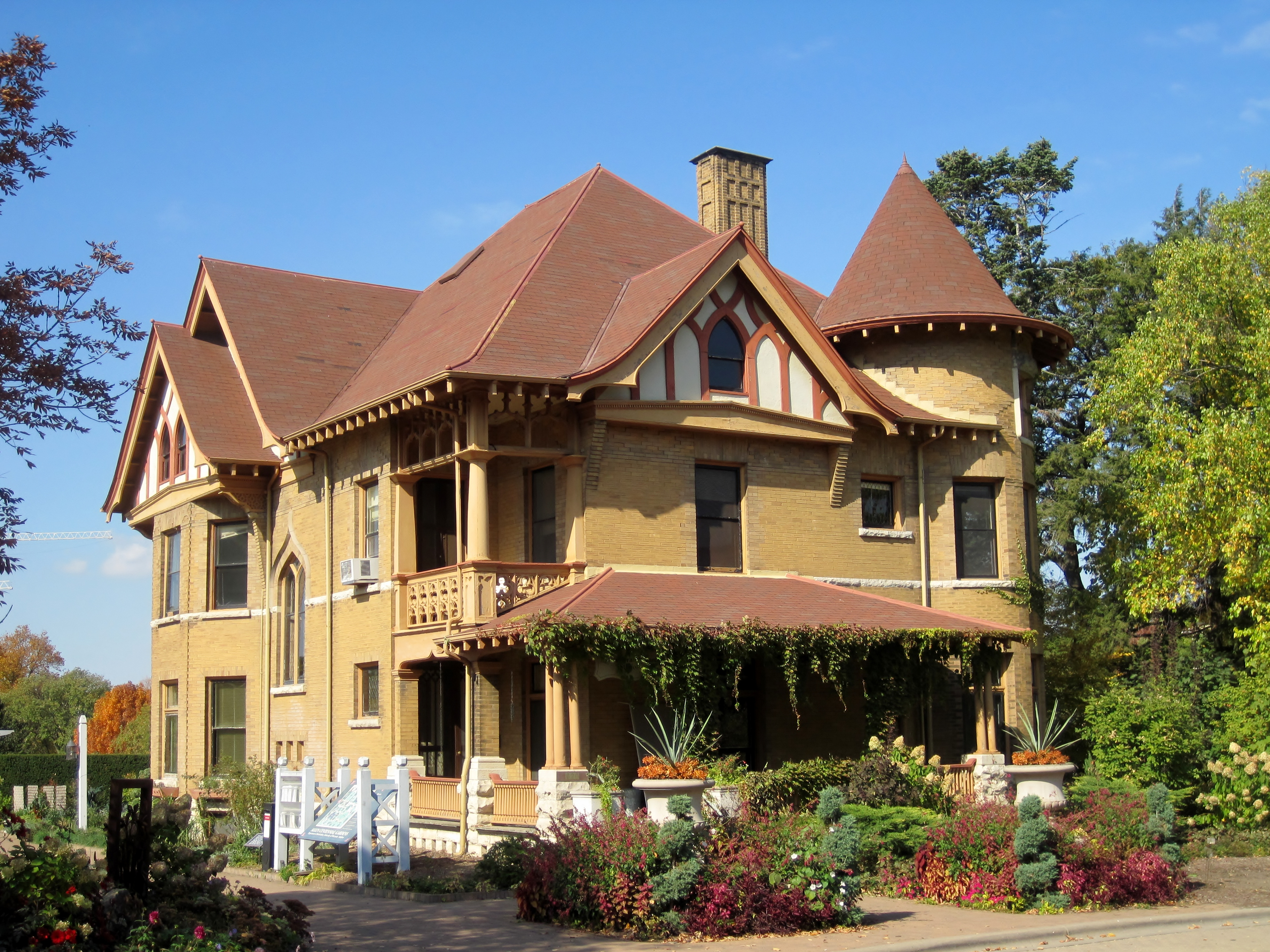
Agricultural Dean's House (1896)

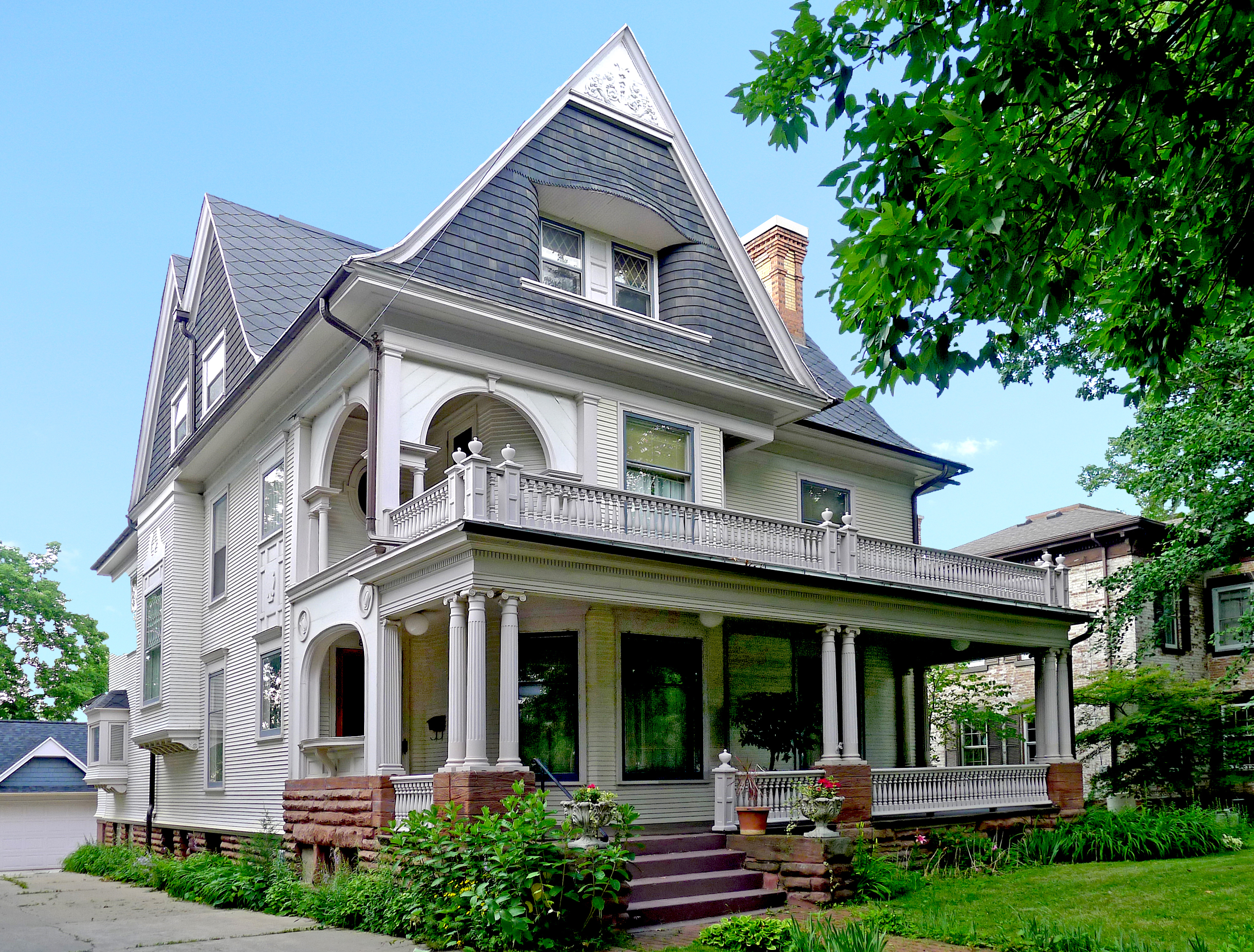
Timothy C. and Katherine McCarthy House (1897)

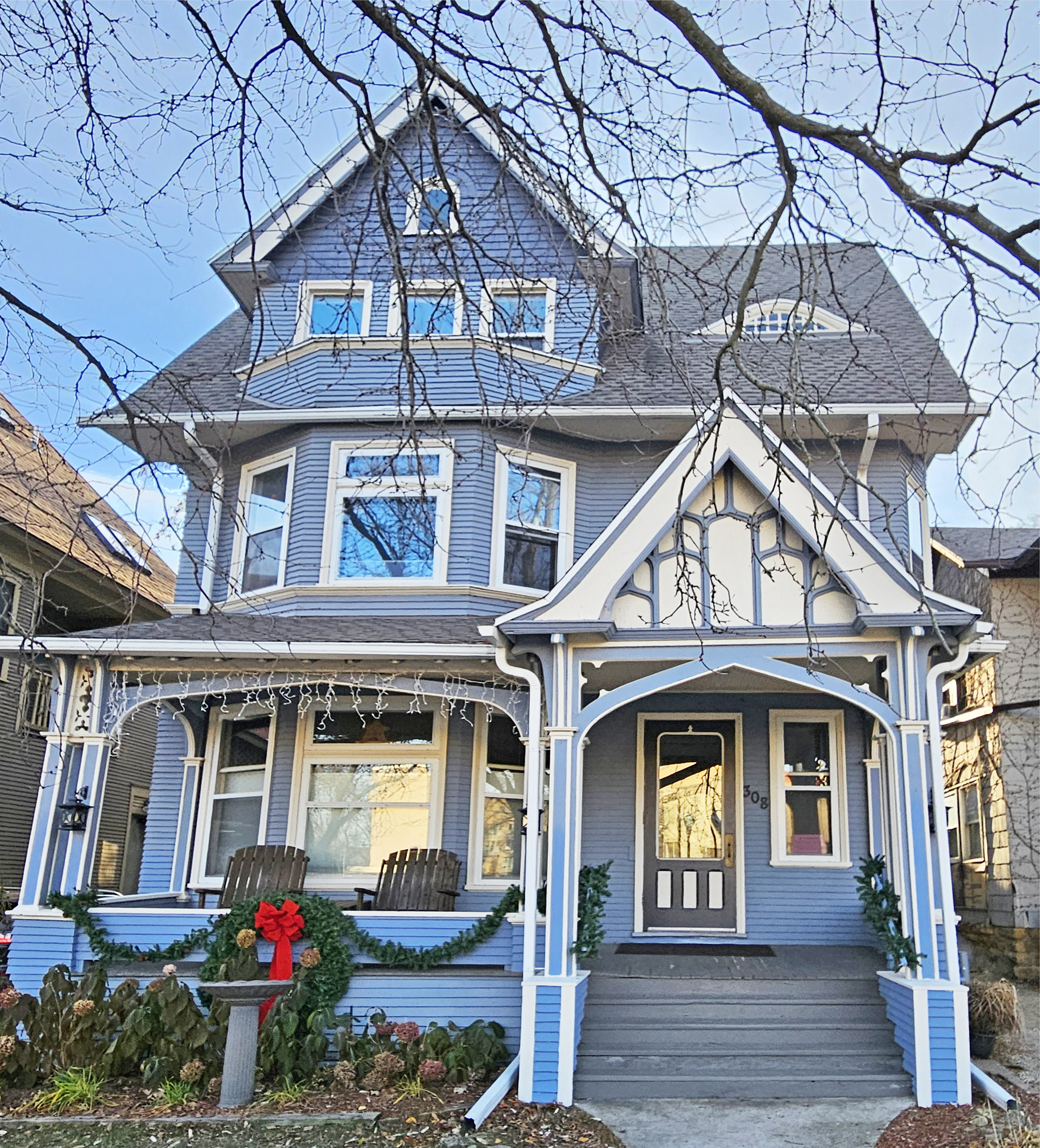
Cornelius and Elizabeth Harper Residence (1898)

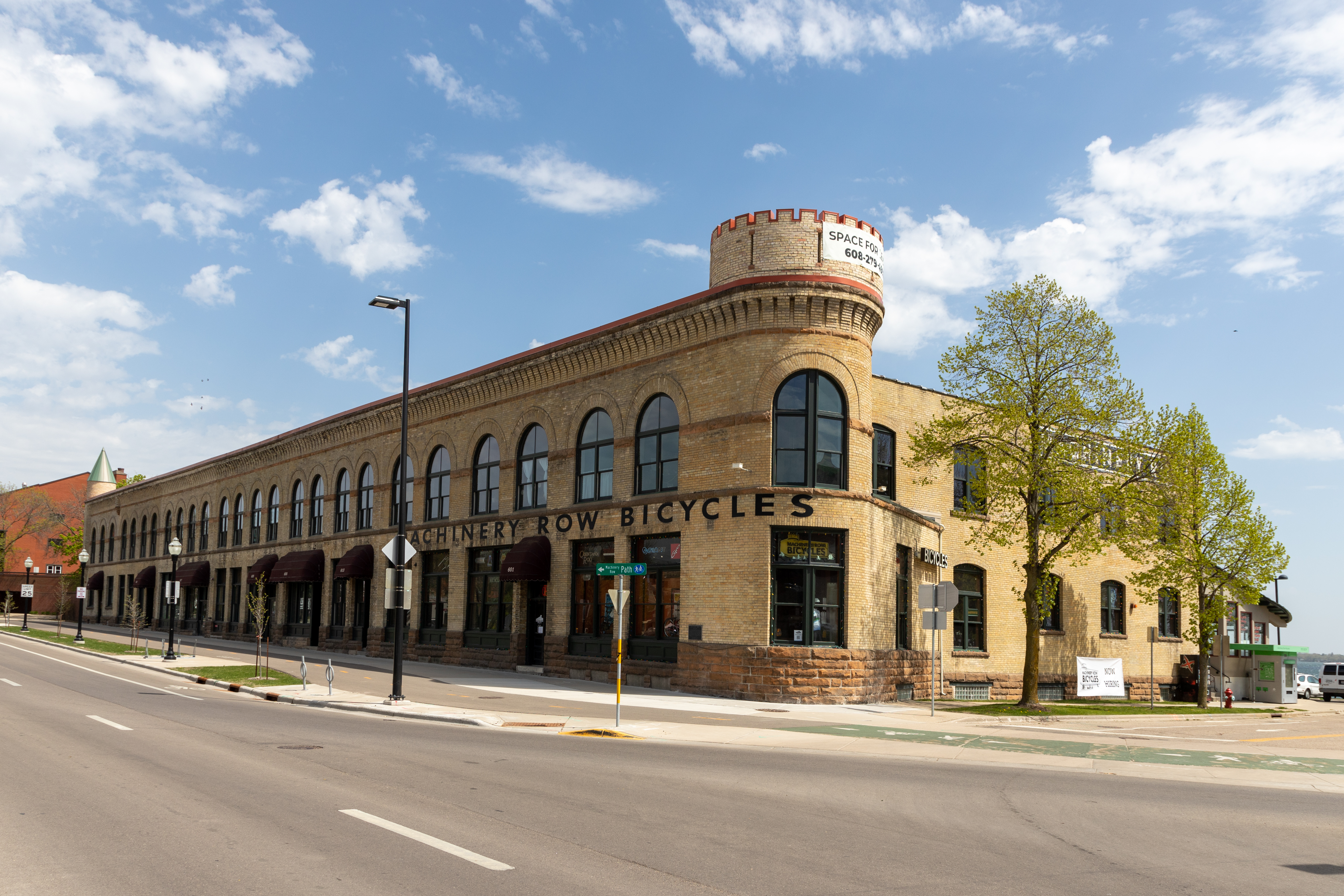
Machinery Row (1898–1912)

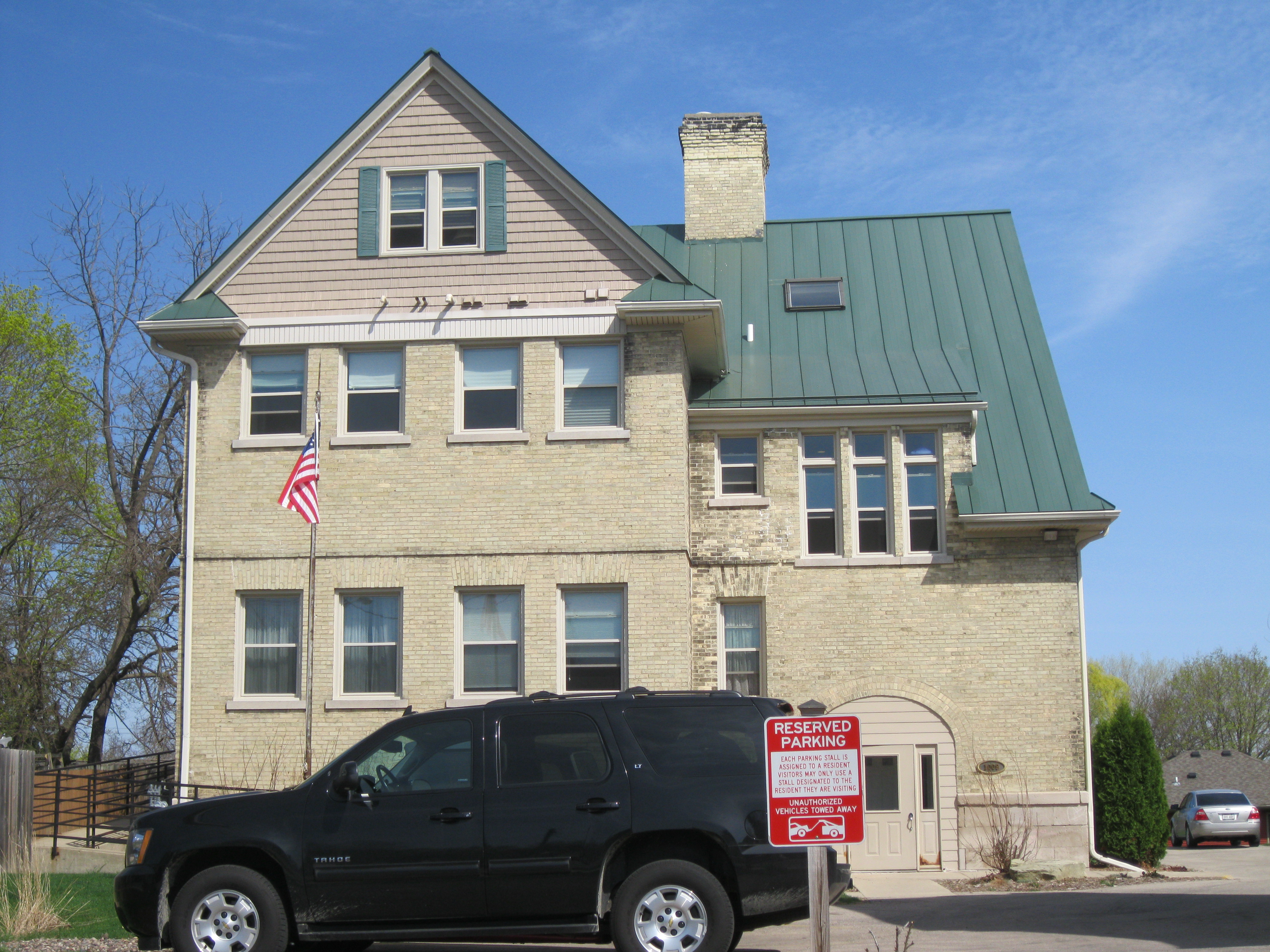
South School in Stoughton, Wisconsin (1900)
