= South School (Stoughton, Wisconsin) =

- U.S. National Register of Historic Places
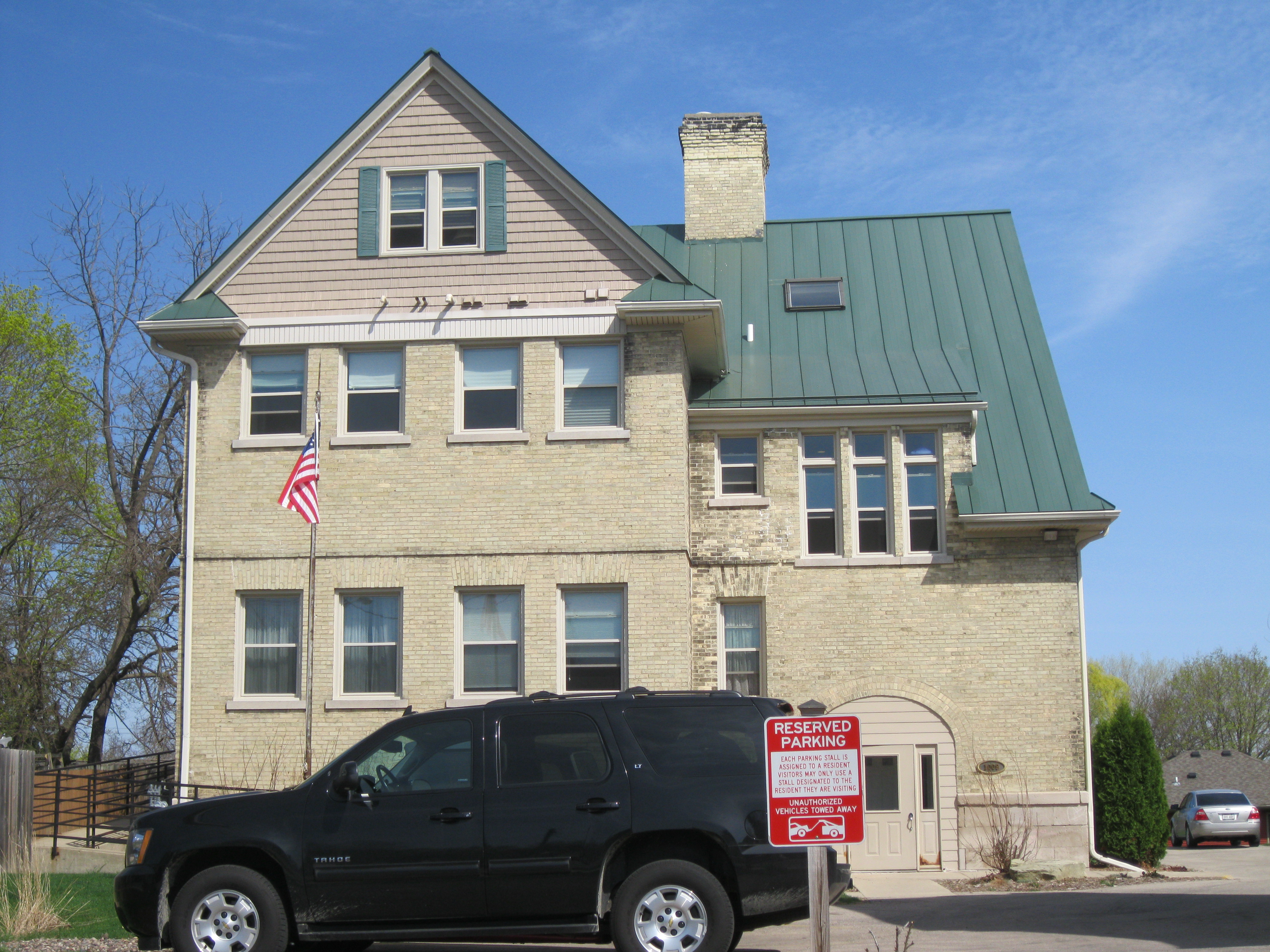

- Location within Wisconsin
- Location: 1009 Summit Ave., Stoughton, Wisconsin
- Coordinates: 42°54′37″N 89°13′08″W
- Area: 1 acre (0.40 ha)
- Built: 1900
- Architect: Allan Conover
- Architectural style: Queen Anne
- NRHP reference No.: 85002319
- Added to NRHP: September 12, 1985

South School is a historic school building at 1009 Summit Avenue in Stoughton, Wisconsin. The school was built in 1900; it is one of five school buildings in Stoughton built between 1886 and 1916, a period of rapid growth for the city. Prominent Madison architect Allan D. Conover designed the school in the Queen Anne style. The school was designed to blend into its residential neighborhood, and its house-like shape and relatively plain exterior minimize its size. Stoughton used the building as an elementary school until 1983, though it was closed between 1943 and 1954 due to budget constraints. The building has since been converted into the South School Condo Association condominiums.

The building was added to the National Register of Historic Places on September 12, 1985.
