= Machinery Row =

- U.S. National Register of Historic Places
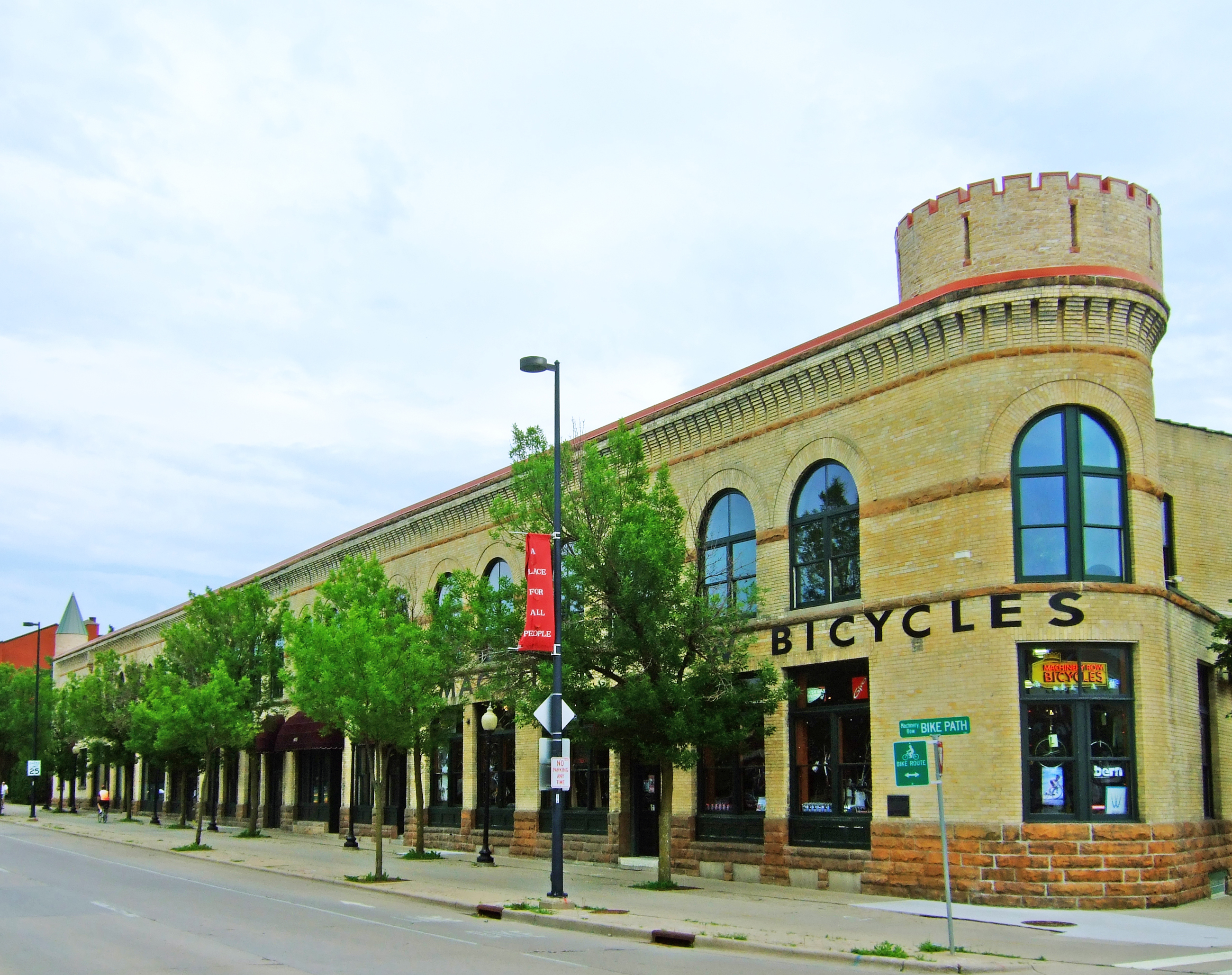
- Machinery Row
- Location: 601-627 Williamson St. Madison, Wisconsin
- Coordinates: 43.07601°N 89.37467°W
- Built: 1898-1912
- Architect: Allan Conover and Lew F. Porter
- Architectural style: Romanesque Revival
- NRHP reference No.: 82000654
- Added to NRHP: April 12, 1982

Machinery Row is a long brick commercial block a half mile east of the capitol in Madison, Wisconsin. It was built in stages from about 1898 to 1914 to house businesses that wanted good access to the east-side railroad depots. Many of the businesses housed in the block distributed agricultural implements, hence "Machinery" in the name. In 1982 the block was added to the National Register of Historic Places.

== History ==
Madison's earliest development focused around the capitol square, but by the 1850s another business district was developing on the east side around Williamson Street. The arrival of the Chicago & Northwestern Railroad in 1864 and the placement of its depot a block away at the intersection of Blair and E. Wilson increased the business activity, as did the arrival of the Chicago, Milwaukee and St. Paul Railroad in 1869.

With rail connections, Madison became a hub for shipping farm equipment from manufacturers to the east to farms west, which were the frontier of American agriculture at that time. It was reported in 1866 "that agricultural implement shipments from Madison had reached 70,760 pounds eastward and 2,686,330 pounds westward. From its small beginnings, Madison was recognized for its central location and it developed into a major distributing center for agricultural implements. Railroad lines reaching in nine directions tied it to the prosperous communities and fertile farmlands of Wisconsin and northern Illinois. The large manufacturers found it more profitable to have branch locations from which their stock could be supplied without delay, rather than shipping directly from the factory." Various branch offices of machinery manufacturers settled around the east Madison depots, and the area was called "Implement Row."

Before Machinery Row was built, Daggett and Gill owned some wooden buildings on the site that housed tobacco warehouses, ice houses, and produce storage. They began to convert some of their buildings for implement distributors as that business grew. In 1889 Advance Thresher Company moved into one of Dagget and Gill's wooden buildings, and there were others.

In 1898 Frank and Frederick Brown bought the Daggett and Gill property. Their father had made a fortune in banking and utilities and their business was listed in 1902 as paying the second highest taxes in the city. The Browns had architects Conover and Porter design a unified brick block for them, the length of the full block, and immediately in 1898 began razing sections of old wooden buildings and replacing them with segments of the new brick one. That same year the railroad improved the spur track behind Machinery Row. The first new section (601-607 Williamson) was complete in 1899 and Advance Thresher moved in. It was described as a "magnificent building... which is the finest and most complete of any implement branch house in the country,... sufficient to stock ten ordinary implement houses." Wooden buildings along the block were replaced by brick one by one until the last remaining wooden structure burned in 1912, and was replaced with brick, completing the unified design of the whole block.

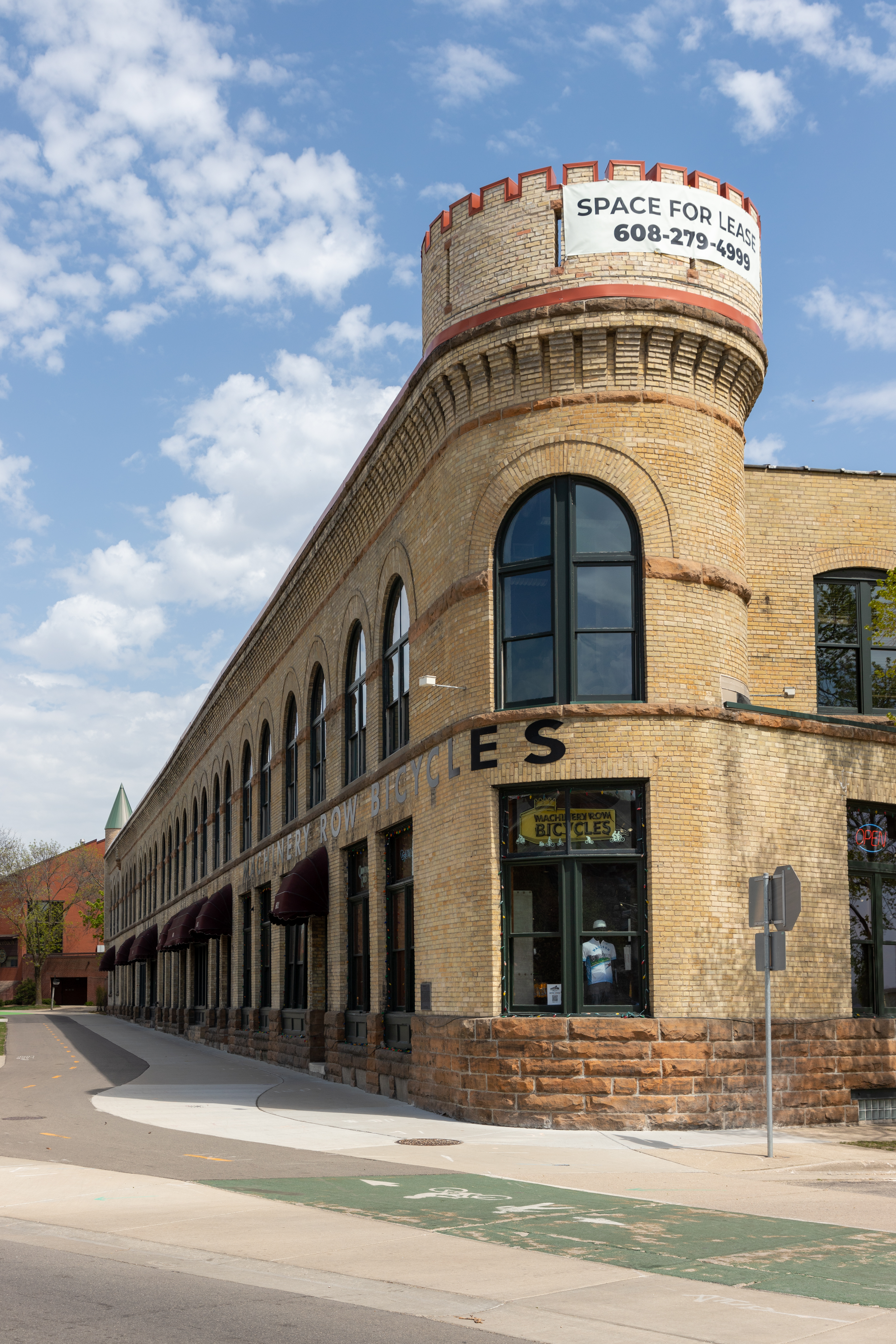
May 2021

Conover and Porter designed the long side of the building facing Williamson Street in Romanesque Revival style, with the base clad in blocks of rusticated sandstone, which was felt to make a building feel grounded. The other hallmark of Romanesque is the round tops above the windows on the second story. The walls are clad in white brick trimmed with "Abelman stone and tile," and rise to a brick corbelled cornice. A round tower rises from the cornice at the northwest corner of the building, suggesting a castle watchtower topped with battlements, rather like the UW's Red Gym which the same architects designed four years earlier. Atop the far end of the block stands a smaller turret with a conical roof.

From the start Machinery Row housed other businesses along with the implement distributors: "fruits and produce, building materials, plumbing and heating, engines and machines, tools, ladies' underwear, printing, electrical supplies, chemicals, paint and candy facilities." The Madison Candy Company rented space there before building its own structure just up Williamson Street. The last implement business was Allis-Chalmers, which stayed until 1954.

In 1980, the building was purchased by former Wisconsin Badgers player and head coach John Coatta and his wife, Jean, the daughter of former Madison Mayor Henry Edward Reynolds.

In 1982 Machinery Row was added to the NRHP for its key role in the commercial history of east Madison and as an important remnant of the agricultural implement trade, as one of the city's few 19th remaining business blocks, as a surviving commercial work of one of Madison's leading architectural firms, Conover and Porter, and as a long-time cornerstone of one of Madison's major intersections.

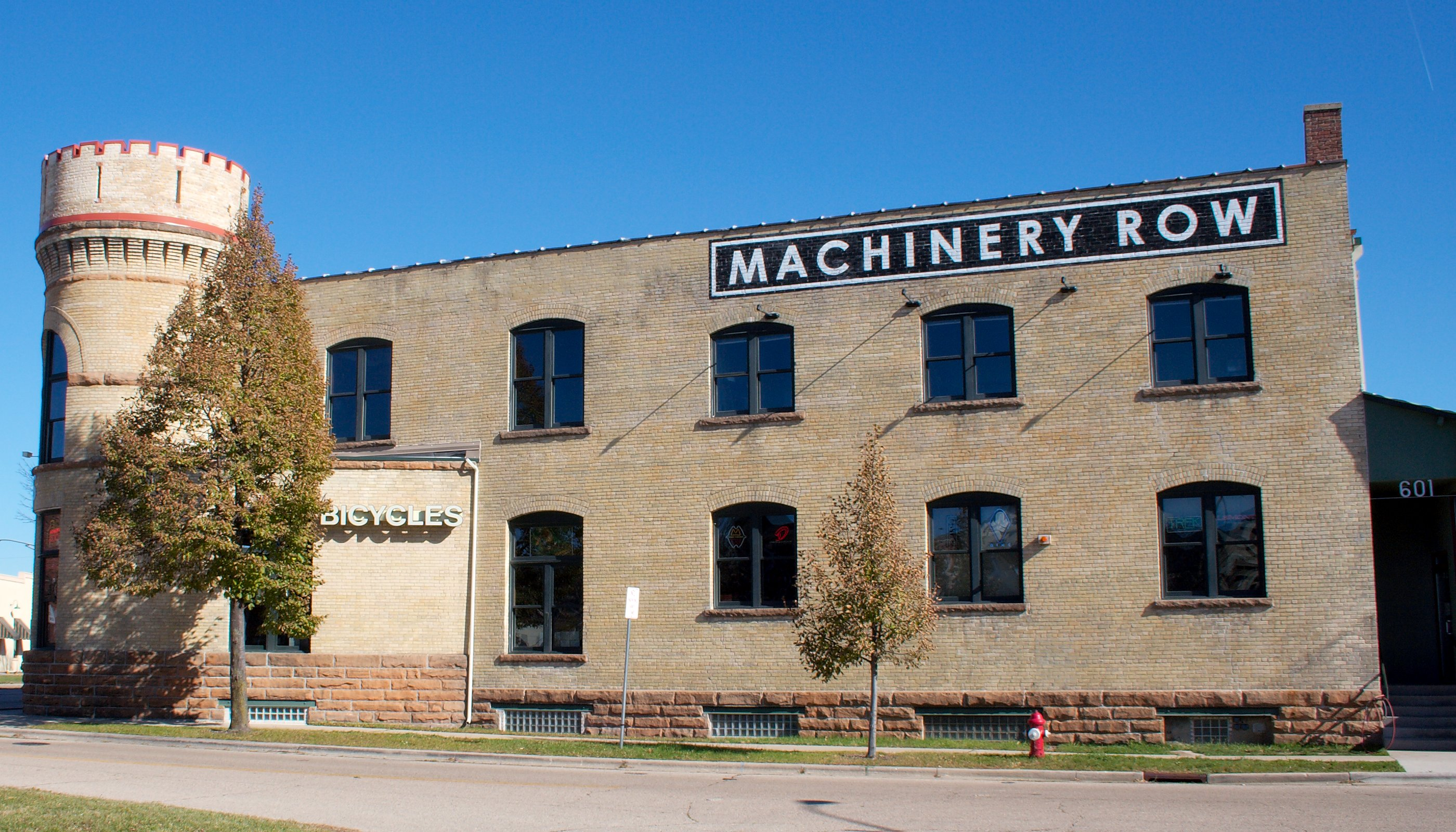
The west end in 2006
