= Randle (disambiguation) =

Randle is a surname and given name. It may also refer to:

- Randle General Hospital, a state general hospital in the Surulere district of Lagos, Nigeria
- Randle, Washington, United States, an unincorporated community
- Randle High School, Fort Bend County, Texas, United States

== See also ==
- Randle House, a plantation house near Norwood, Stanly County, North Carolina, United States, on the National Register of Historic Places
- Randall (disambiguation)
- Randel
- Randell
- Randle cycle, a metabolic process
