= Randall =

Randall may refer to the following:

== Places ==
=== United States ===
- Randall, California, former name of White Hall, California, an unincorporated community
- Randall, Indiana, a former town
- Randall, Iowa, a city
- Randall, Kansas, a city
- Randall, Minnesota, a city
- Randall, West Virginia, an unincorporated community
- Randall, Wisconsin, a town
- Randall, Burnett County, Wisconsin, an unincorporated community
- Randall County, Texas
- Randall Creek, in Nebraska and South Dakota
- Randall's Island, part of New York City
- Camp Randall, Madison, Wisconsin, a former army camp, on the National Register of Historic Places
- Fort Randall, South Dakota, a former military base, on the National Register of Historic Places

=== Elsewhere ===
- Mount Randall, Victoria Land, Antarctica
- Randall Rocks, Graham Land, Antarctica
- Randall, a community in the town of New Tecumseth, Ontario, Canada

== Businesses ==
- Randall Amplifiers, a manufacturer of guitar amplifiers
- Randall House Publications, American publisher
- Randall Made Knives, a manufacturer of knives
- Randalls, a retail grocery store chain based in Houston, Texas

== Schools and institutes ==
- Randall Division of Cell and Molecular Biophysics (the Randall), a research institute of King's College London
- Randall University, a Christian liberal arts college in Moore, Oklahoma
- Randall High School (Amarillo, Texas), a public school
- Randall Junior High School, Washington, DC, on the National Register of Historic Places

== Ships ==
- USS Randall, a US Navy attack transport ship in World War II
- USS General George M. Randall, a US Navy troop ship in World War II
- SS Richard Randall, a US World War II Liberty ship

== People ==
- Randall (given name)
- Randall (surname)

== Fictional characters ==
=== Given name ===
- Randall Boggs, a character and the main antagonist in the Monsters, Inc. franchise
- Randall "Randy" Disher, on the American TV series Monk
- Randall Flagg, in works by Stephen King
- Randall Hiebert, a character from the 2020 Andrew Unger novel Once Removed
- Randall Pearson, from the American TV series This Is Us
- Randall Shire, in the Marvel Comics Universe
- Randall Weems, from the American animated TV series Recess
- Randall or Randy, a character in Trailer Park Boys

=== Surname ===
- Hester Randall, on the Channel 5 soap opera Family Affairs
- Jeff Randall, a character in two British TV series, both titled Randall and Hopkirk (Deceased) (1969, 2000)
- Josh Randall, on the American TV series Wanted: Dead or Alive, played by Steve McQueen
- Lucas Randall, on the Canadian TV series Strange Days at Blake Holsey High
- Rex Randall, on the Channel 5 soap opera Family Affairs
- Tex Randall, a 47-foot tall cowboy figure constructed in 1959 in Canyon, Texas
- Lieutenant Randall, a non-playable character in the video game Call of Duty 2

== Other uses ==
- Randall Airport, a public use airport in Orange County, New York
- Randall Building (disambiguation)
- Randall Children's Hospital at Legacy Emanuel, Portland, Oregon
- Randall House (disambiguation)
- Randall Museum, San Francisco, California
- Randall Road, a major roadway in Illinois

== See also ==
- "Lord Randall", a British ballad
- Randal (disambiguation)
- Randell
- Randel
- Randle
