= Mac Raghnaill =

Irish family name

- Mac Raghnaill in a Gaelic type, note the lenited g in the name (gh) once appeared in Irish orthography with a dot above it, as pictured.
- Gender: Masculine
- Language: Irish

Origin
- Language: Irish
- Meaning: "son of Raghnall"

Other names
- Variant forms: Mac Rághnaill, Mac Raonaill

Mac Raghnaill is a masculine surname in the Irish language. The name translates into English as "son of Raghnall". The surname originated as a patronym, however it no longer refers to the actual name of the bearer's father.

The name Raghnall is a Gaelic derivative of the Old Norse personal name Røgnvaldr / Rǫgnvaldr / Rögnvaldr. Variant forms of the surname include Mac Rághnaill and Mac Raonaill. These three surnames can be Anglicised variously as: Grannell, MacRanald, MacRandell, MacCrindle, MacReynold, MacReynolds, Randalson, Rondalson, Reynoldson, Rannals, Randals, Randles, Ranolds, and Reynolds. The Irish surnames are borne by numerous unrelated families; some are of Irish origin, others of Scottish origin, some are of English origin, and some may be of Norwegian and or Danish origin.

== People with the name ==
=== mac Raghnaill ===
- Domhnall mac Raghnaill (fl. 13th century), Hebridean magnate
- Ruaidhrí mac Raghnaill (died 1247?), Hebridean magnate

=== Mac Raghnaill ===
- Ailbhe Mac Raghnaill, better known in English as Albert Reynolds, (born 1932), Irish, Taoiseach of Ireland.
- Cathal Mhég Raghnaill., in English Charles Reynolds (born 1496-7), Irish, Archdeacon of Kells.
