= Fire Station No. 4 (Madison, Wisconsin) =

- U.S. National Register of Historic Places
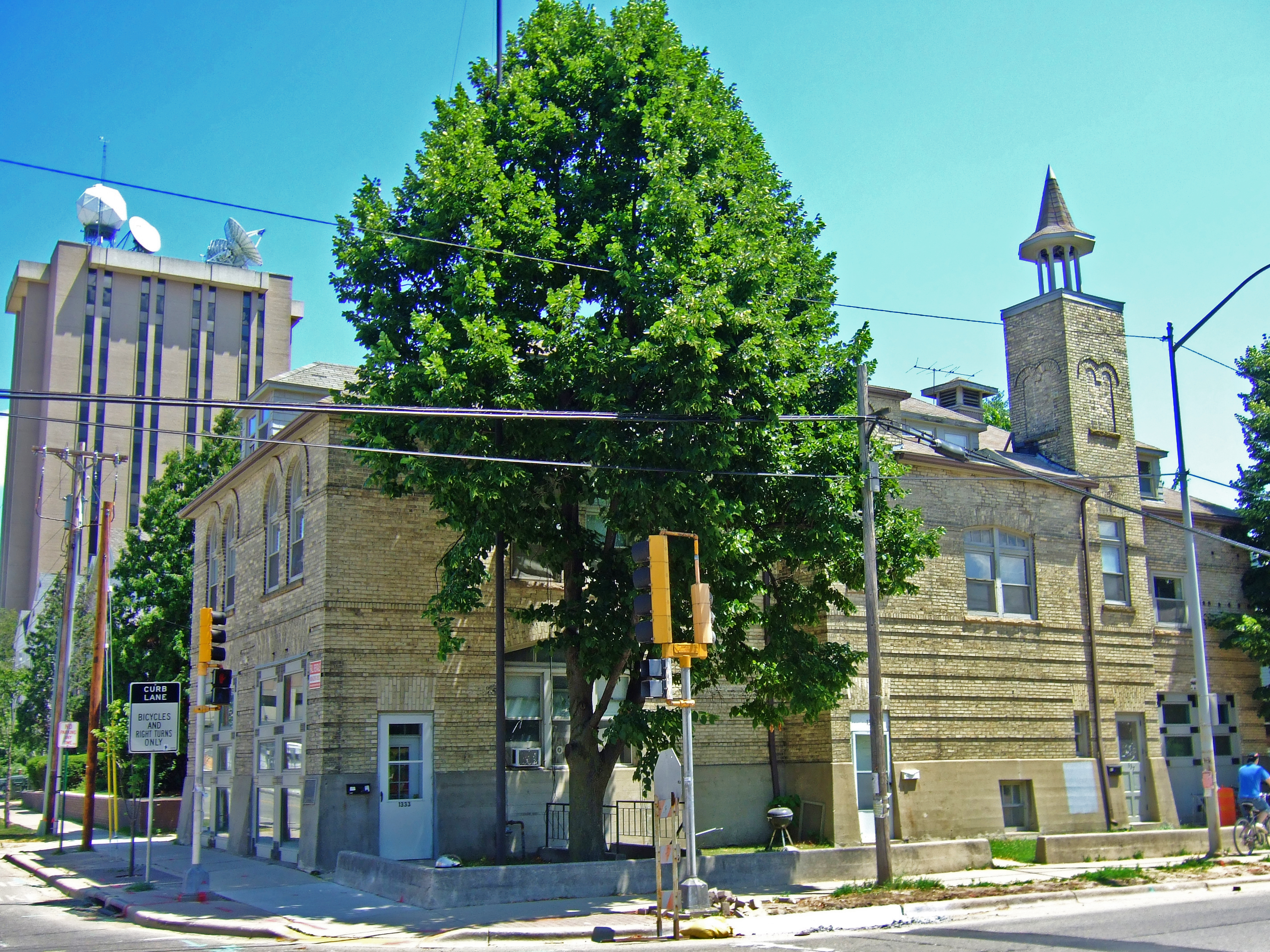
- Fire Station No. 4
- Location: 1329 W. Dayton St., Madison, Wisconsin
- Coordinates: 43°04′15″N 89°24′31″W
- Area: less than one acre
- Built: 1904
- Architect: Lew F. Porter
- NRHP reference No.: 84003637
- Added to NRHP: March 1, 1984

The Fire Station No. 4 was built in 1904 a mile west of the capitol in Madison, Wisconsin, when fire engines were still pulled by horses. In 1984 the building was listed on the National Register of Historic Places.

== History ==
Up to 1900 Madison's fire stations were all on the isthmus, where the early city grew. In 1901 the city bought a lot on Frances Street for another station on the isthmus, but the city was rapidly expanding west, and there was concern that it would take too long for horses from the isthmus to reach a fire on the west side. In 1904 Fire Captain Bernard recommended that the new station instead be built in what was then the west side, near Camp Randall, where it still stands.

Architect Lew F. Porter, who was also involved in design of the UW's Red Gym and later the Camp Randall Arch just down the street, designed the two story fire station to blend somewhat into what was then a residential neighborhood. Porter's first design was too expensive, so he made some cuts and got it under $5000. The result can be classed as Romanesque Revival style, with round arches on some openings, a hip roof, and the projecting rows of brick on the first story giving the impression of rootedness to the ground. The north tower originally held a platform with a semicircular parapet. The south tower was a hose-drying tower, topped with a cupola with a witch's cap roof. The side facing Dayton Street has two large doorways that the horses and engines could pass through.

Inside on the first floor was an apparatus room in front. In back was the horse stable. Upstairs was a hay mow over the stable, and sleeping quarters for the firemen. Three brass poles gave the firemen a quick way down. After the era of horses, the hay mow was converted to a bedroom and day room for the station commander.

When first built, the station was equipped with two horses and a combined chemical and hose wagon. The switch from horses to motorized equipment began in Madison in 1910 and completed in 1919 at this station. Station #4 was the last to finish the transition from horses, but continued to fight fires with motorized equipment until 1983.

After decommissioning as a fire station, the building was converted into apartments. It was listed on the National Register of Historic Places in 1984 and on the State Register of Historic Places in 1989 - the oldest intact fire station in Madison and the only one from the horse era.
