= Randell =

Randell is a given name and surname. It may refer to:

== Given name ==
- Randell (given name), masculine given name

== Surname ==
People with the surname include:

- Adam Randell (born 2000), English footballer
- Aleksi Randell (born 1975), Finnish politician
- Arthur Randell (1901–1988), British author
- Barbara Rae Randell (born 1942), Australia botanist and entomologist
- Brian Randell (born 1936), British computer scientist
- Choice B. Randell (1857–1945), American politician from Texas
- Cortes Wesley Randell (1935–2020), American engineer
- Denny Randell (born 1941), American songwriter
- Ernest Randell (1873–1938), Australian cricketer
- George Randell (1830–1915), Australian politician from Western Australia
- Jaedyn Randell, voice actor who plays the character of Moana in the Māori language versions of the Moana Disney films
- Lynne Randell (1950–2007), Australian singer
- Ron Randell (1918–2005), Australian-American film actor
- Ronnie Randell (1886–1978), South African cricketer and lawyer
- Steve Randell (born 1956), Australian Test cricket umpire; convicted of sexual assault against schoolgirls
- Taine Randell (born 1974), New Zealand rugby union player
- William Randell (1824–1911), Australian riverboat pioneer and politician

== See also ==
- Randel
- Randle
- Randal (disambiguation)
- Randall (disambiguation)
