= Randles =

Randles is a surname which may refer to:

- Elizabeth Randles (1800–1829), Welsh child prodigy harpist and pianist
- Jan Randles (1945–2025), Australian Paralympic runner
- Jenny Randles, British author and former director of investigations with the British UFO Research Association
- John Scurrah Randles (1875–1945), British businessman and politician
- Jos Randles (1865–1925), English footballer
- Kerri Randles (born 1971), American actress, writer and producer
- Paul Randles (1965–2003), American game designer
- Paul Randles (cricketer) (1922–1979), South African cricketer
- Peter Randles (1923–2008), Australian politician
- Robert Randles (1888–1916), English footballer
- Tom Randles (footballer) (born 1940), former footballer for New Zealand
- Tom Randles (hurler), Irish hurler from the 1950s to the 1980s

== See also ==
- Randle, a surname and a given name
- Randles circuit, an electrical model
