= 1908 Big Nine Wrestling Championships =

- Classification: Division I
- Teams: 2
- Site: Red Gym; Madison, Wisconsin

The 1908 Big Nine Wrestling Championships was held at the Western Intercollegiate Gymnastics Association Meet on April 9, 1908, in Madison, Wisconsin at the Red Gym.

== Championship bout ==
W. W. Sylvester of Wisconsin and Nelson of Minnesota faced off in a championship match for the title. Neither wrestler could record a fall and the match was deemed a draw.
