= Lew Porter =

Lew Porter may refer to:

- Lew Porter (composer) (1892–1956), American composer and songwriter
- Lew Porter (gridiron football) (born 1947), American and Canadian football player
- Lew F. Porter (1862–1918), American architect and civil engineer

== See also ==
- Lewis Porter (born 1951), American jazz pianist, composer, author, and educator
