= Randal =

Randal may refer to:

== People ==
=== Given name ===
- Randal and Randall (given names), English-language masculine given names.
- Randal Gaines, American politician
- Rand Paul, United States Senator

=== Surname ===
- Allison Randal, a linguist, software developer and author.
- Hakon Randal, (born 1930), a Norwegian politician.

=== Fictional characters ===
- Randal Graves, a character from the View Askewniverse and character of Clerks (1994), Clerks II (2006), Clerks III (2022), and Clerks: The Animated Series

== Places ==
- Randal, Iran, a village in Gilan Province, Iran
- Randal Tyson Track Center, a 5,500-seat indoor track in Fayetteville, Arkansas, USA
- Randal, a hamlet of le Vrétot, a French commune in Normandy

== Other ==
- Randal Óg CLG, a Gaelic Athletic Association club, founded in 1953.
- "Lord Randall" or "Lord Randal", a British ballad
- Sanjna, also known as 'Randal Maa', A Hindu Goddess

== See also ==
- Randall (disambiguation)
