= Confederate Rest =

Historic cemetery in Madison, Wisconsin

Coordinates: 43°03′54″N 89°25′44″W

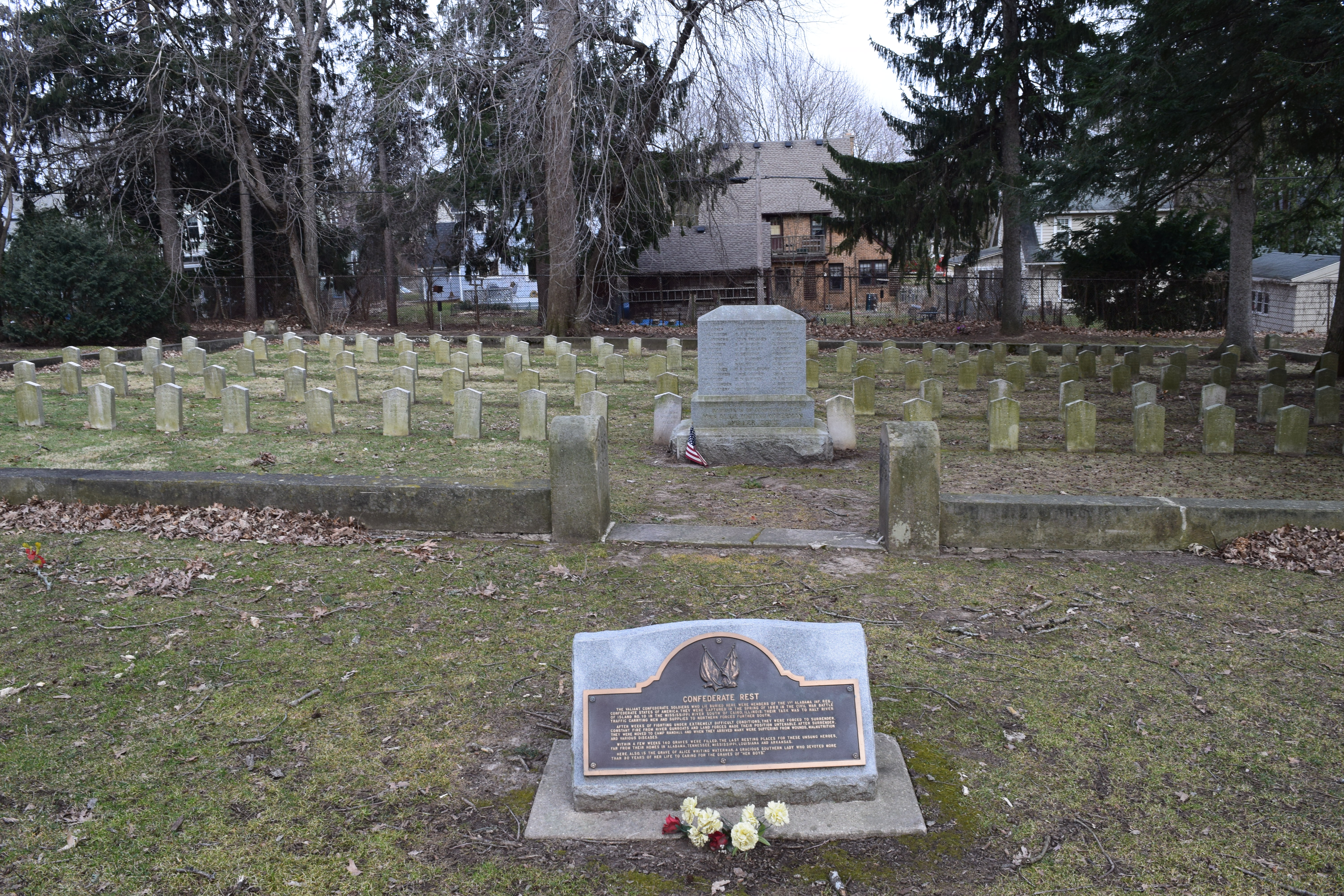
- Confederate Rest in 2017
- Interactive map of Confederate Rest

Details
- Location: Madison, Wisconsin
- Type: Confederate POW graveyard
- No. of graves: 140

Confederate Rest, in Forest Hill Cemetery, Madison, Wisconsin, is the northernmost Confederate graveyard in the nation. 140 Confederate prisoners of war who died under Union captivity lie in it.

== History ==
=== Origins ===
“They die off like rotten sheep. There was 11 die off yesterday and today, and there ain’t a day but what there is from two to nine dies.”

— Private Paddock, of the 19th Wisconsin Regiment

Following the Battle of Island Number Ten, about 1400 Confederate soldiers who surrendered there, many from the 1st Regiment Alabama Infantry, were taken at the end of April, 1862, to the Union training field Camp Randall in Madison, Wisconsin, which was found to be unsuitable, resulting in the deaths of 140 prisoners before the remaining survivors were sent to Camp Douglas (Chicago) at the end of May 1862.

=== Mass grave and reorganization ===
The dead prisoners were interred in a mass grave. In the early years, Alice Waterman, a Madison resident who lived near the cemetery, cared for the burial grounds using her own funds. Later, each deceased was given his own tombstone.

=== Confederate cenotaph removed ===
In January 2019, after a year-long debate, a stone cenotaph etched with the names of the 140 Confederate prisoners of war was removed from the cemetery by the Madison Parks Department and transferred to storage at the Wisconsin Veterans Museum.
