= Randel =

Randel may refer to:

== People ==
=== Given name ===
- Randel (given name), a masculine given name in the English language

=== Surname ===
- Andreas Randel (1806–1864), Swedish composer and violinist
- Don Michael Randel (born 1940), American musicologist
- John Randel, Jr. (1787–1865), American surveyor
- Matt Randel (born 1977), American-Korean baseball player
- Tony Randel (born 1956), American film director and screenwriter

== See also ==
- Randell
- Randle
- Randall (disambiguation)
