= Randall House =

Randall House or Randall Farm may refer to:

== Publisher ==
- Randall House Publications, a U.S. publisher of Christian publications

== Places ==
- Truman-Randall House, Florence, Arizona, listed on the National Register of Historic Places in Pinal County, Arizona
- Alfred Jason Randall House, Pine, Arizona, listed on the NRHP in Gila County, Arizona
- John Randall House, North Stonington, Connecticut, listed on the NRHP in New London County, Connecticut
- T. W. Randall House, Silver Springs, Florida, listed on the NRHP in Marion County, Florida
- Jacob Randall House, Pownal, Maine, listed on the NRHP in Cumberland County, Maine
- Randall-Hildreth House, Topsham, Maine, listed on the NRHP in Sagadahoc County, Maine
- Randall-Hale Homestead, Stow, Massachusetts, listed on the NRHP in Middlesex County, Massachusetts
- Randall House (Mayville, Michigan), an octagon house listed on the NRHP in Tuscola County, Michigan
- Harry E. Randall House, Great Falls, Montana, listed on the NRHP in Cascade County, Montana
- Randall Farm (Lee, New Hampshire), listed on the New Hampshire State Register of Historic Places
- Randall Farm (Cortland, New York), listed on the NRHP in Cortland County, New York
- Dr. Rufus Randall Residence, Bath, Ohio, listed on the NRHP in Summit County, Ohio
- Cornell-Randall-Bailey Roadhouse, Johnston, Rhode Island, listed on the NRHP in Providence County, Rhode Island
- Melvin Harley Randall House, Centerville, Utah, listed on the NRHP in Davis County, Utah
- Adin Randall House, Eau Claire, Wisconsin, listed on the NRHP in Eau Claire County, Wisconsin
- Randall House, Wolfville, Nova Scotia, a Community Museum
- Brewster Randall House, Janesville, Wisconsin, listed on the NRHP in Rock County, Wisconsin

== See also ==
- Randall Building (disambiguation)
- Camp Randall, Madison, Wisconsin
- Fort Randall, Pickstown, South Dakota
