= Reynoldson =

Reynoldson is a surname. Notable people with the surname include:

- George Reynoldson (1856–1947), Australian politician
- Kirk Reynoldson (born 1979), Australian professional rugby league footballer
- Nick Reynoldson, Canadian stand-up comedian
- Steve Reynoldson (born 1962), Australian rules footballer
- W. Ward Reynoldson (1920–2016), American lawyer and judge
