= Robert Randles =

English footballer

Personal information
- Full name: Robert Randles
- Date of birth: 12 February 1888
- Place of birth: Birkenhead, England
- Date of death: 8 or 9 October 1916 (aged 28)
- Place of death: Somme, France
- Position: Inside left

Senior career*
Years	Team	Apps	(Gls)
1906	Liverpool	0	(0)
- Tranmere Rovers
1908–1909	Chesterfield Town	4	(1)
- Tranmere Rovers
- * Club domestic league appearances and goals

Robert Randles (12 February 1888 – 8 or 9 October 1916) was an English professional footballer who played as an inside left in the Football League for Chesterfield Town.

== Personal life ==
Randles served as a private in the 16th Battalion (Canadian Scottish), CEF during the First World War and was killed on 8 or 9 October 1916. He was buried in Adanac Military Cemetery, France.

== Career statistics ==
Appearances and goals by club, season and competition
Club	Season	League			FA Cup		Total	
Club	Season	Division	Apps	Goals	Apps	Goals	Apps	Goals
Chesterfield Town	1908–09	Second Division	4	1	0	0	4	1
Career total			4	1	0	0	4	1
