= Lew F. Porter =

Wisconsin architect

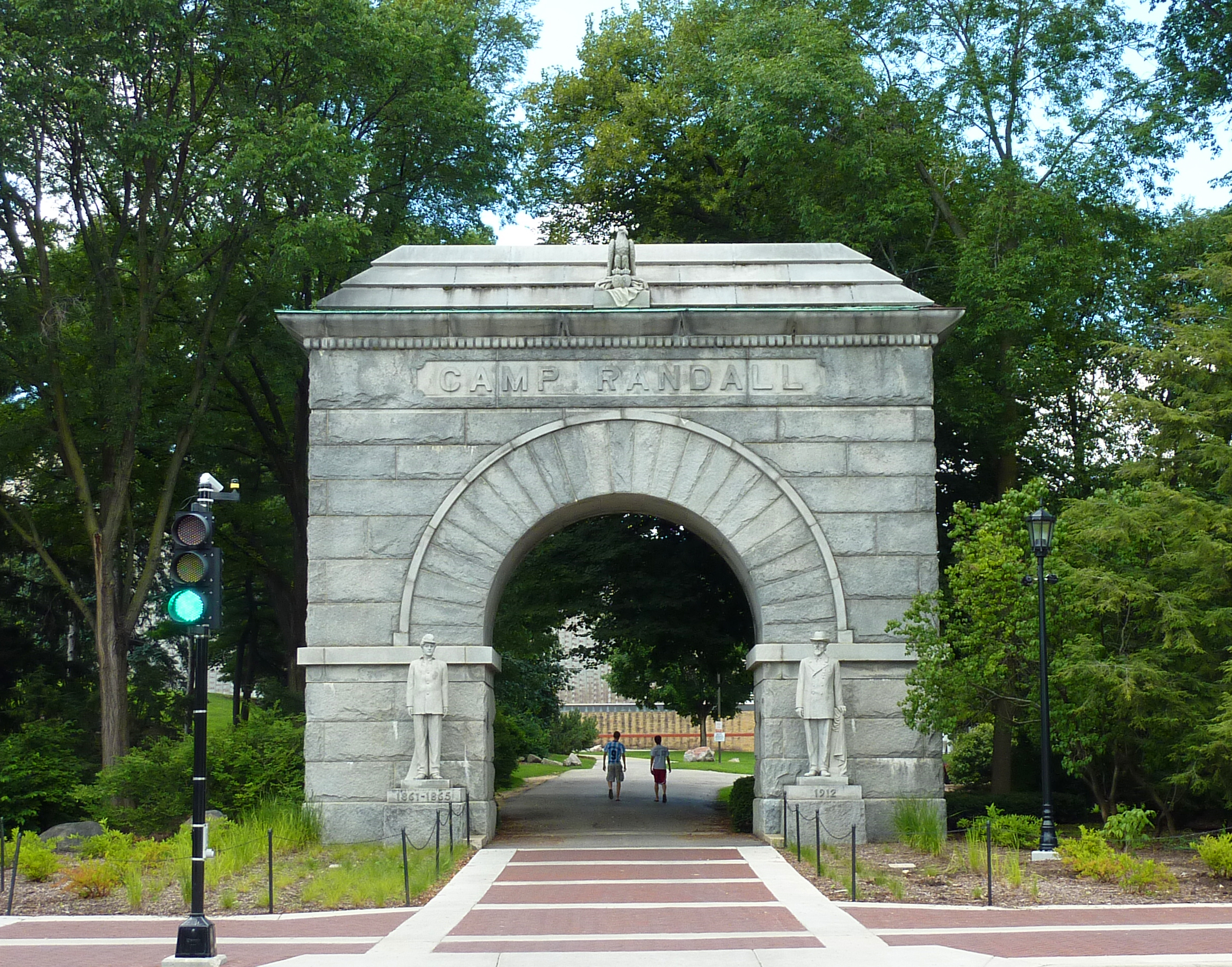
- The memorial arch at Camp Randall is just one of several structures designed by Porter in Madison, Wisconsin
- Born: July 6, 1862; Peru, Illinois, U.S.
- Died: April 15, 1918 (aged 55); Madison, Wisconsin, U.S.
- Education: Beloit College; University of Wisconsin–Madison
- Occupation: Architect
- Spouse: Carolyn Lucretia Howe
- Children: 4
- Buildings: See works
- Projects: Wisconsin State Capitol

Lew Forster Porter (July 6, 1862 – April 15, 1918), sometimes spelled as Lew Foster Porter, was an American architect and civil engineer from Peru, Illinois. During Porter's career he was one of the principal builders of the Wisconsin State Capitol as well as the capitol building commission's permanent secretary. Porter was a longtime business partner of Allan Conover and was the co-owner of their architectural and engineering firm, Conover & Porter. Porter was also the architectural mentor of Frank Lloyd Wright who was an apprentice under both Conover and Porter.

== Early life ==
Lew Forster Porter was born on July 6, 1862 in Peru, Illinois to Joseph Porter and Maria Kirk. Growing up, Porter lived in Freeport, Illinois with his family. He had three brothers and two sisters. Porter later studied architecture at both Beloit College and the University of Wisconsin–Madison before formally working in architecture.

== Career ==
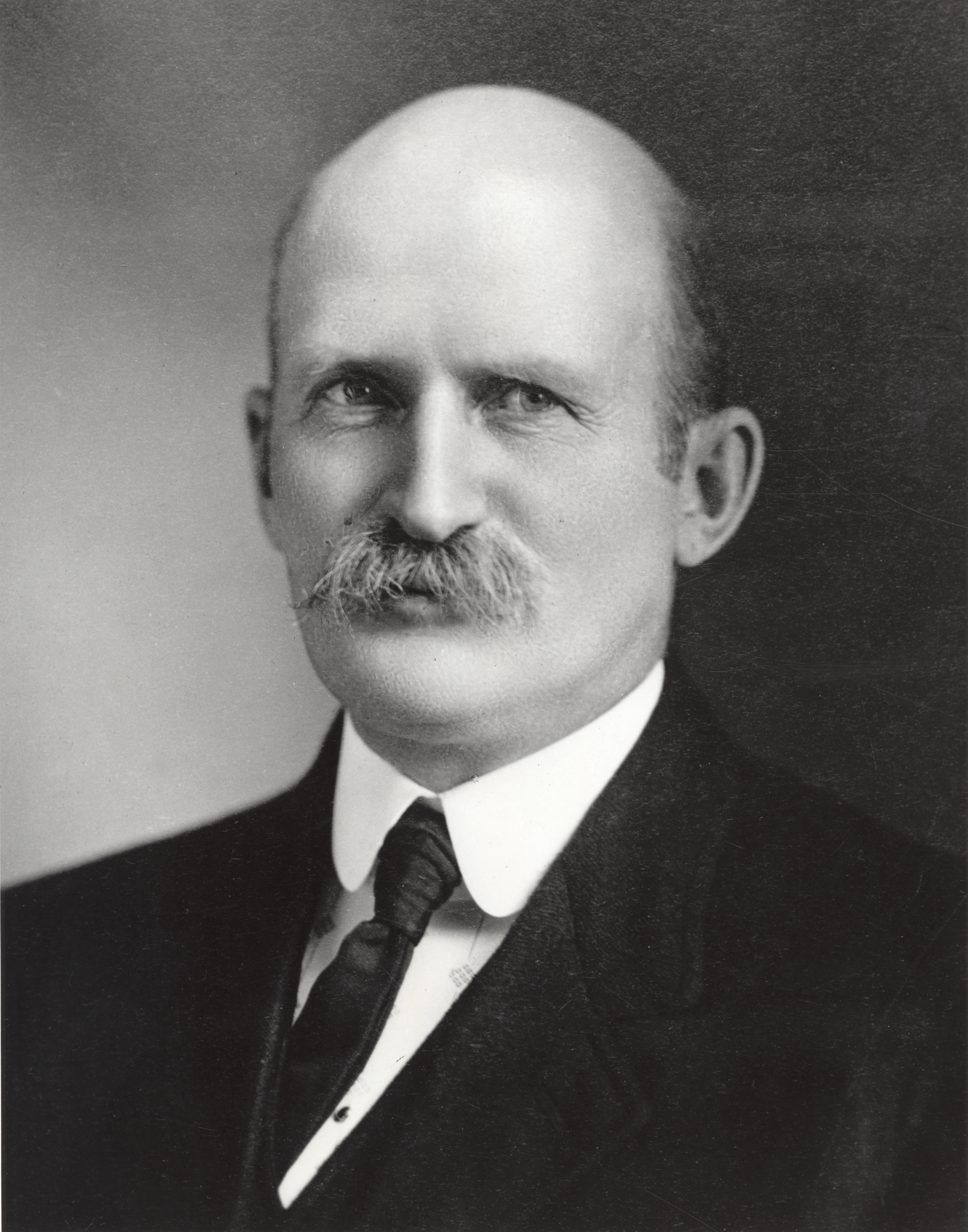
Allan Conover, Porter's employer and business partner

Porter began his career in 1885 working for Allan Conover after graduating from the University of Wisconsin–Madison. Conover was a fellow architect and the professor of civil engineering for the University of Wisconsin–Madison. In 1885 Porter and Conover began an architectural and engineering firm named Conover & Porter, based in Madison. Porter would serve as the principal architect of Conover & Porter from 1885 until January 1899. By 1887 Conover and Porter established a branch office for their firm. Some of their designs at the time included the Knight Hotel, the First National Bank, the Security Bank, the Dane county jail, the Breen block, and the Vaughn building in Madison.

During this time Frank Lloyd Wright was a student of architecture at the University of Wisconsin–Madison and apprenticed under Porter. According to William Allin Storrer, author of The Architecture of Frank Lloyd Wright: A Complete Catalog, "His exposure to the ideas of Alan Conover and Lew Porter must have opened up a treasure chest of ideas for him. The fact that he was in the office for over two years (perhaps more) left an indelible impact on his mind forever".

From 1885 to 1917 Porter and Conover constructed a wide variety of buildings in and around Wisconsin, primarily in the state's capital city of Madison. One of the most notable would be the University of Wisconsin Armory and Gymnasium, first planned on May 17, 1892. The armory and gymnasium was constructed from 1892 to 1894 and the building opened by May 1894.

In 1906 Porter was hired by business associate George B. Post to be the secretary of the Wisconsin State Capitol's building commission. As the permanent secretary of the commission, Porter was to be paid $3,500 (roughly $128,900 in 2026) annually for his position during the capitol's construction from 1906 to 1917. The Wisconsin state capitol building was completed by 1917, just one year before Porter died.

In 1912 Porter was commissioned to create the Memorial Arch at Camp Randall, later part of Camp Randall Stadium in Madison. According to the University of Wisconsin–Madison, the memorial arch is carved entirely out of granite and pays tribute to the 70,000+ soldiers of the Union Army who received military training at Camp Randall between 1861 and 1865 during the American Civil War. The arch was formally dedicated on June 18–19, 1912.

Porter died on April 15, 1918 at the age of 55 in Madison. He is buried in Forest Hill Cemetery in Madison, Wisconsin.

== Personal life ==
Porter was married to Carolyn Lucretia Howe. Together they had four children: three sons and one daughter.

== Partial list of works ==
- Wisconsin State Capitol (1906–1917) in Madison, Wisconsin.
- Christian Dick Block in Madison.
- Dane County courthouse (1885–1958) in Madison.
- University of Wisconsin Science Hall in Madison.
- Camp Randall Memorial Arch at Camp Randall.
- Security Savings Bank in Ashland, Wisconsin.
- University of Wisconsin Armory and Gymnasium at Bascom Hill in Madison.
- Machinery Row in Madison.
- Charles and Martha Buell House in the University Heights Historic District in Madison.
- Various houses in the Mansion Hill Historic District in Madison.
- Fire Station No. 4 at 1329 W. Dayton Street in Madison.
- New Glarus Public School and High School in New Glarus, Wisconsin.
- Timothy C. and Katherine McCarthy House in the Jenifer-Spaight Historic District in Madison.
- Bank of Washburn in Washburn, Wisconsin.
- Agricultural Dean's House at 620 Babcock Drive in Madison.

== Gallery ==
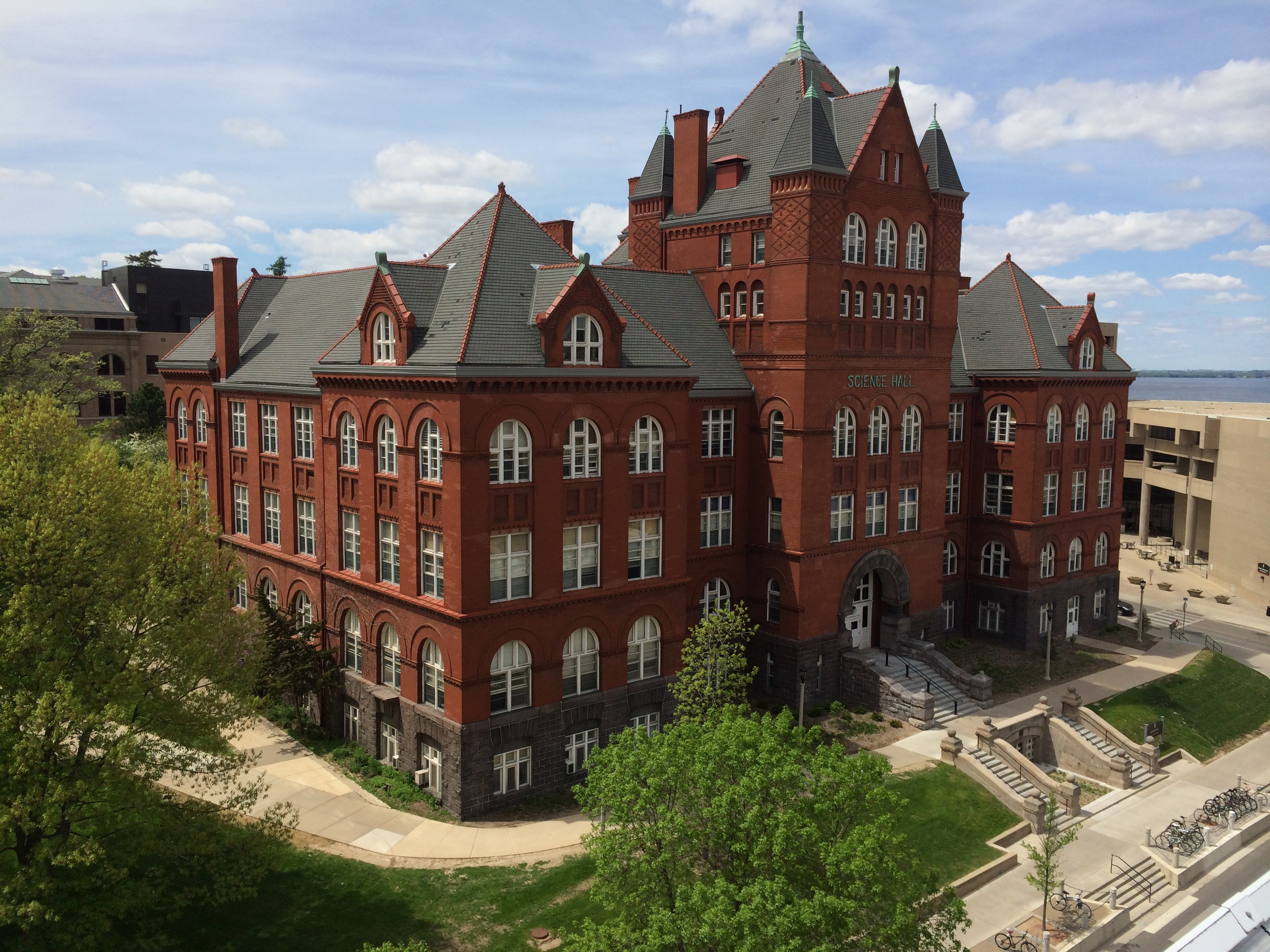
University of Wisconsin Science Hall (1888)

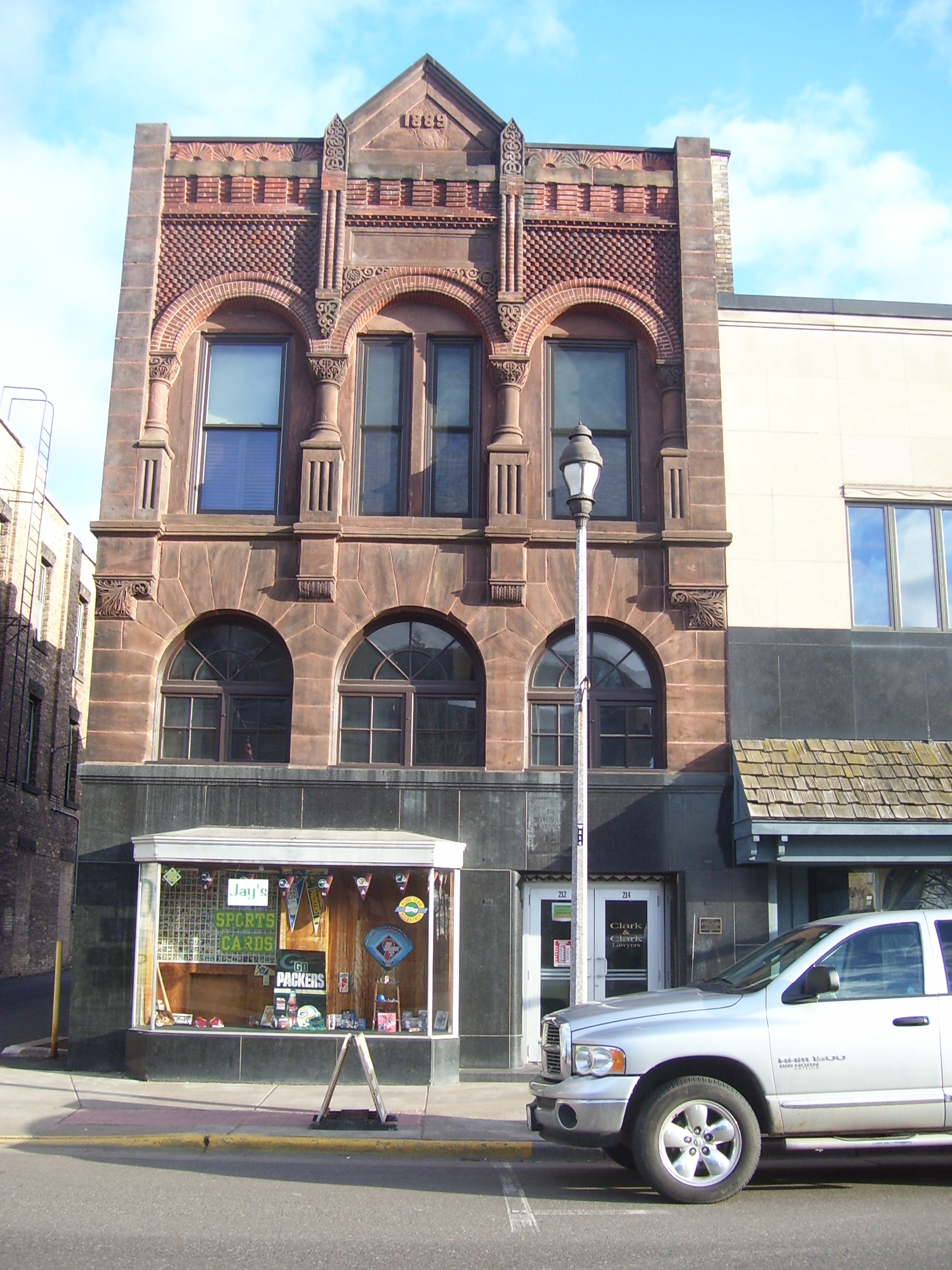
Security Savings Bank (1889)

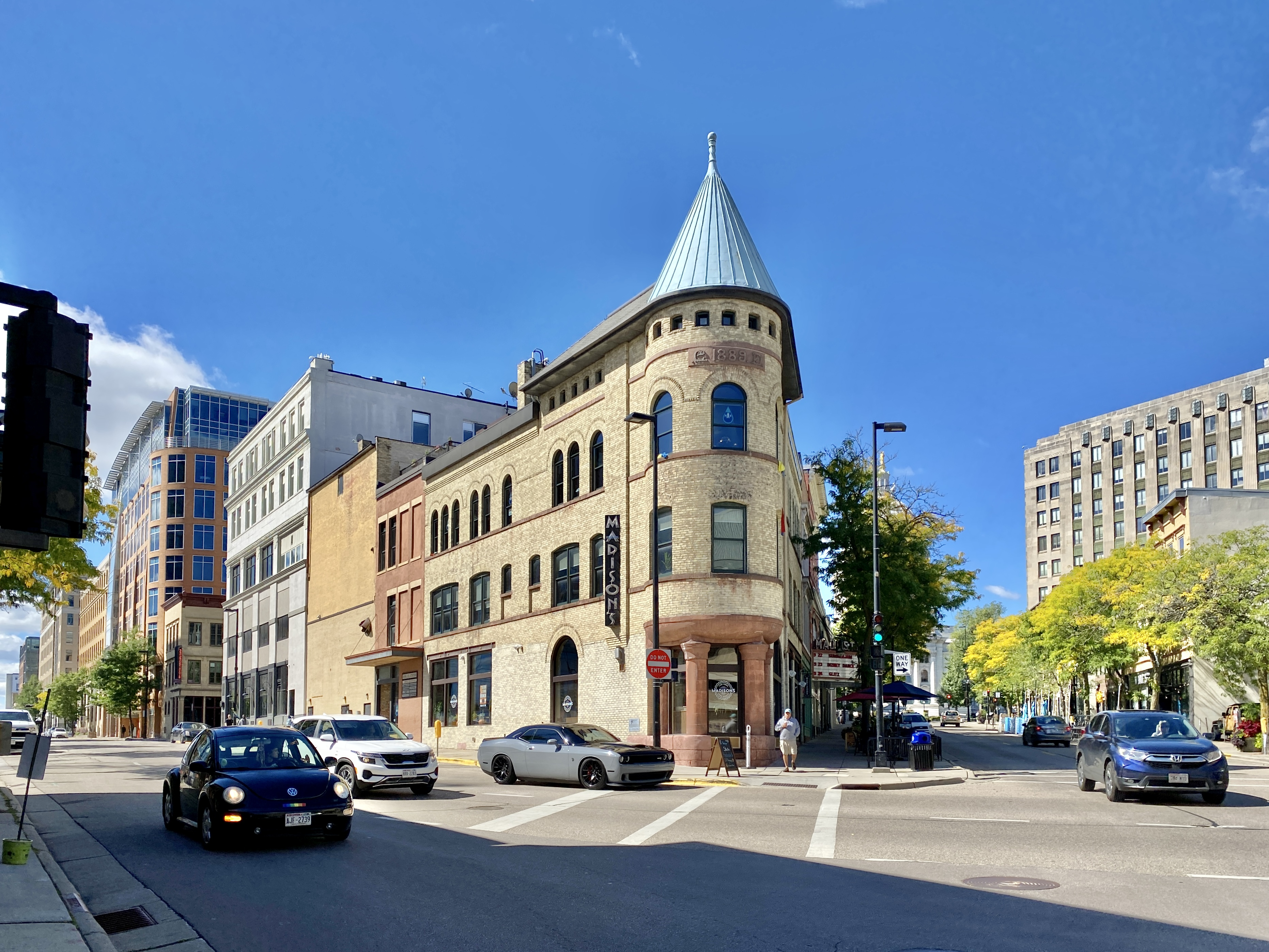
Christian Dick Block (1889)

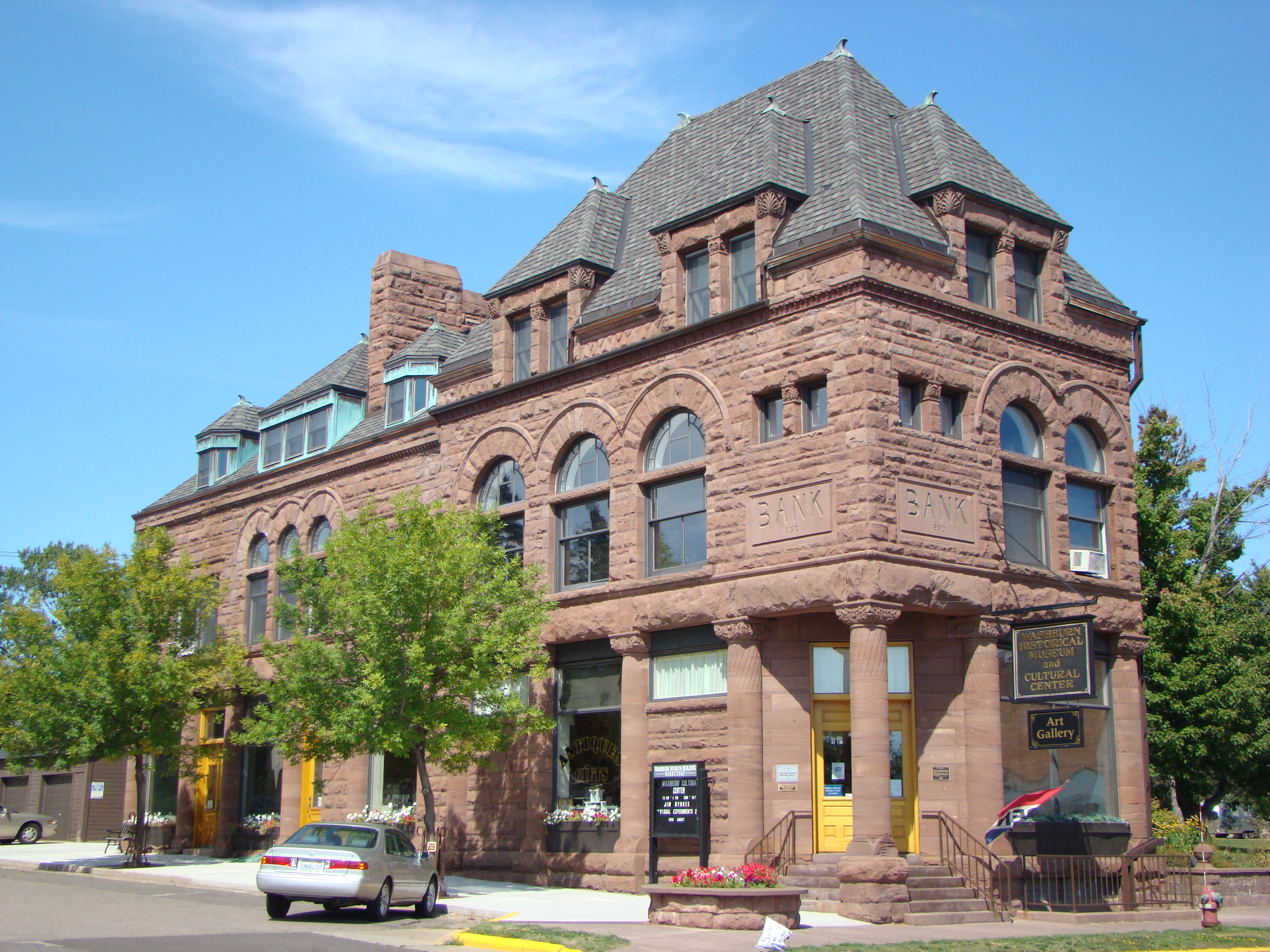
Bank of Washburn (1890)

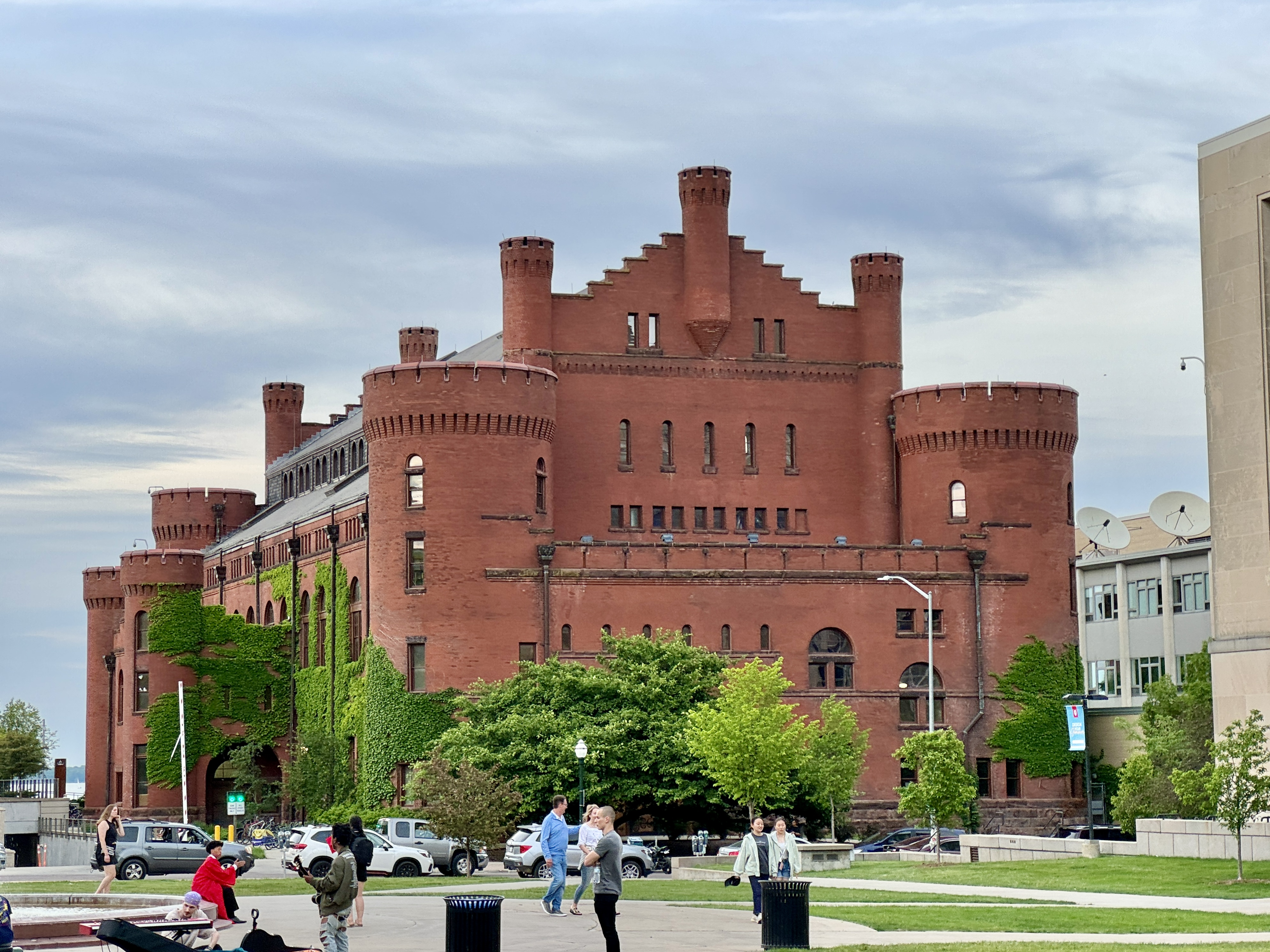
University of Wisconsin Armory and Gymnasium (1894)

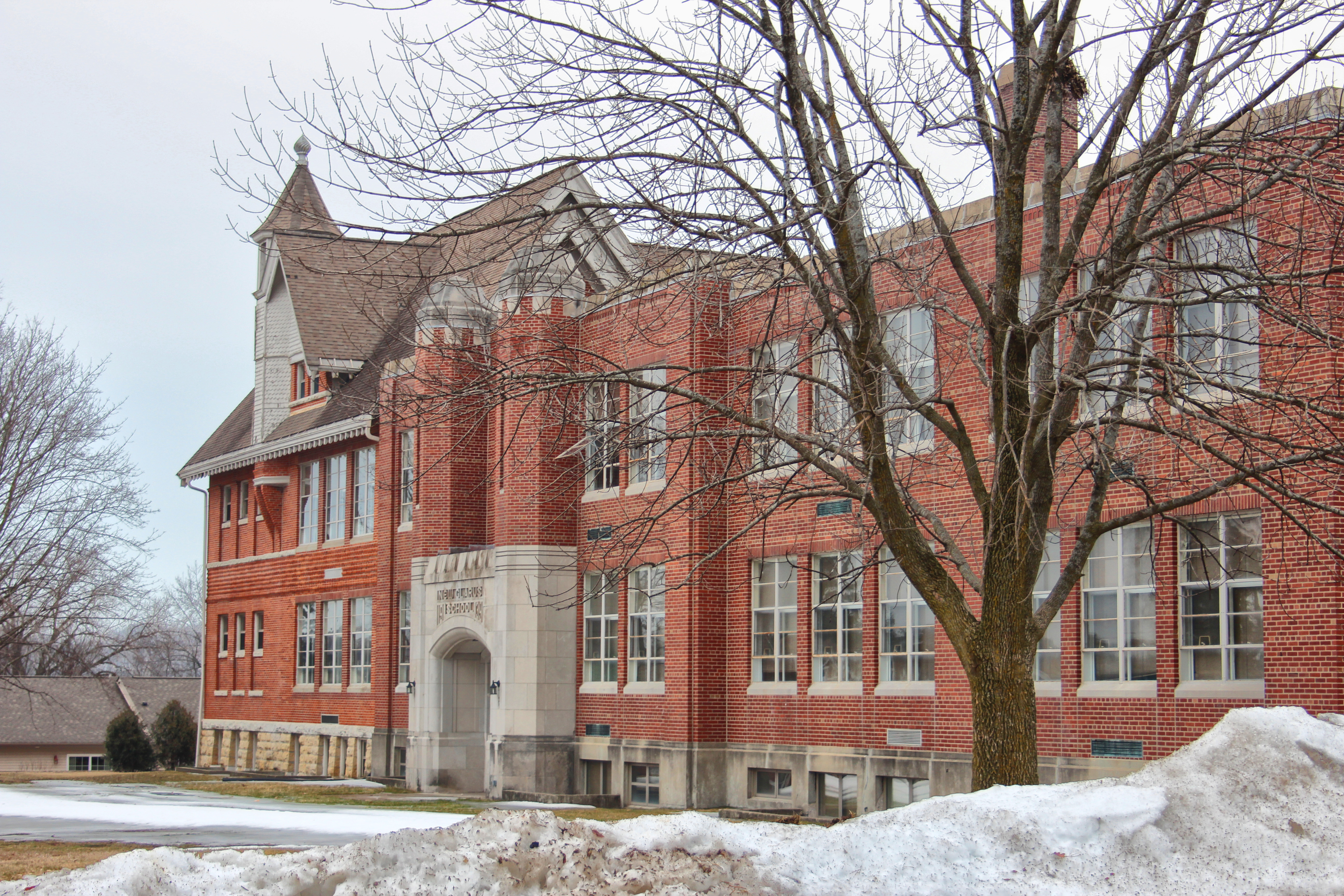
New Glarus Public School and High School (1890's)

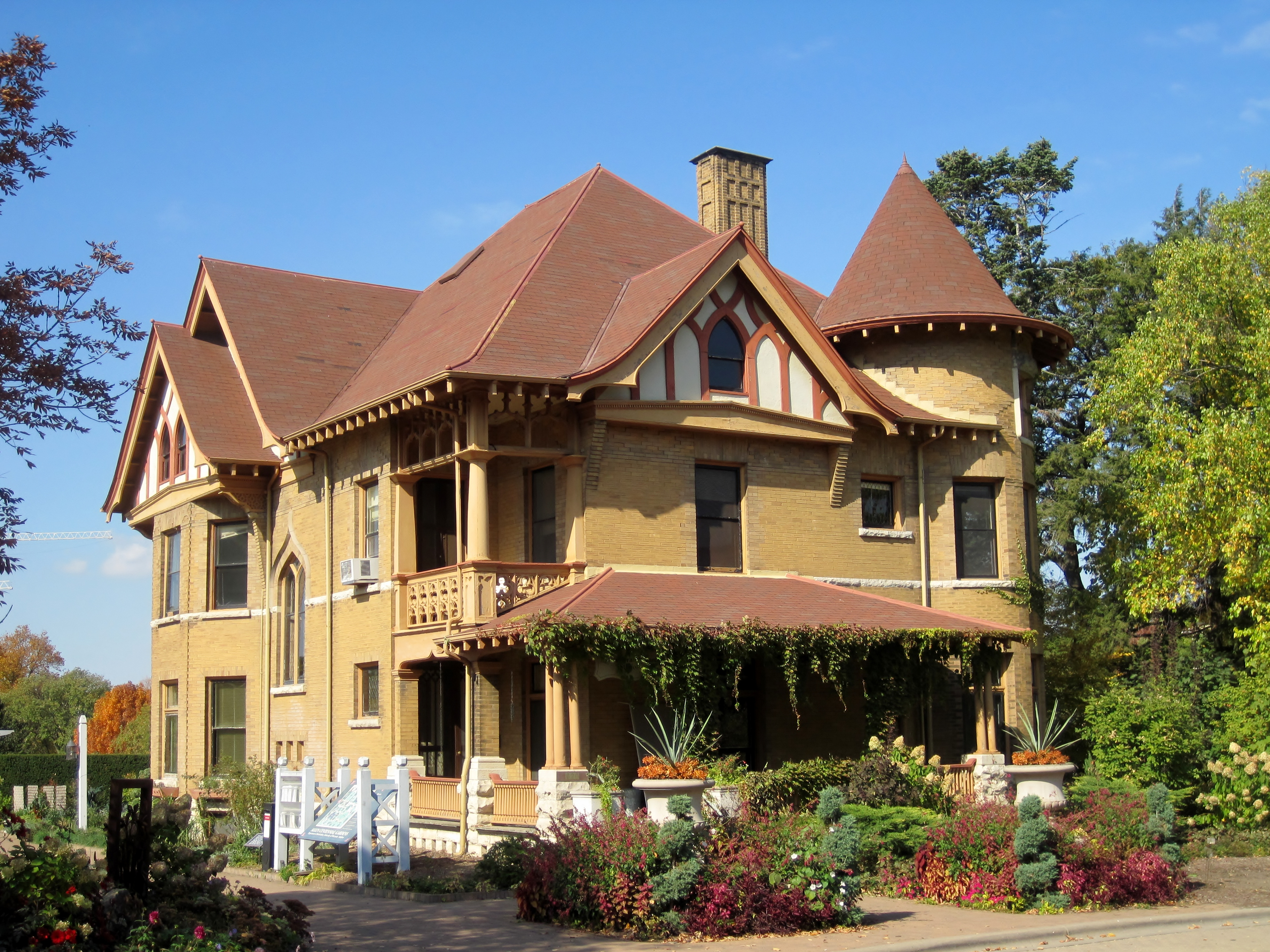
Agricultural Dean's House (1896)

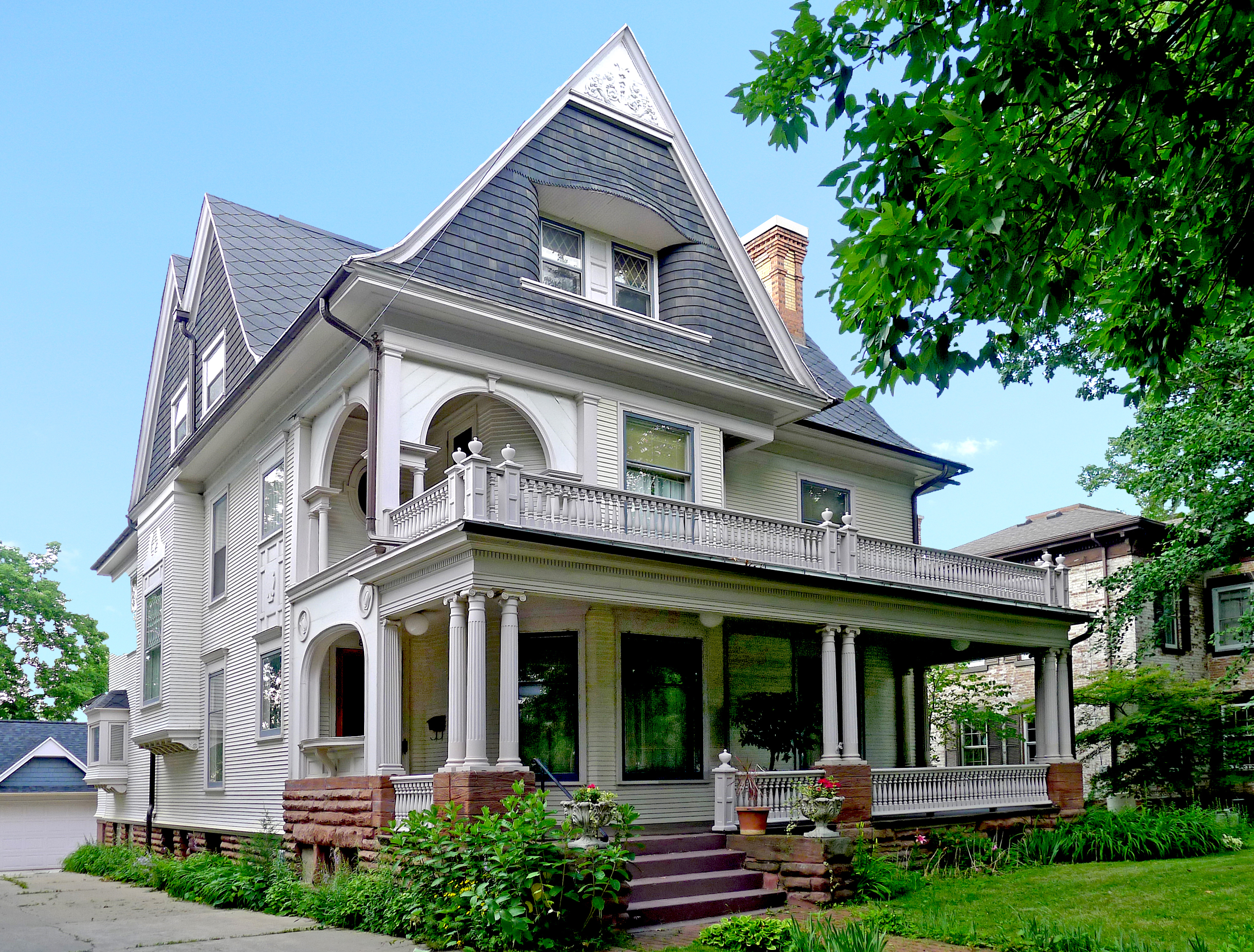
Timothy C. and Katherine McCarthy House (1897)

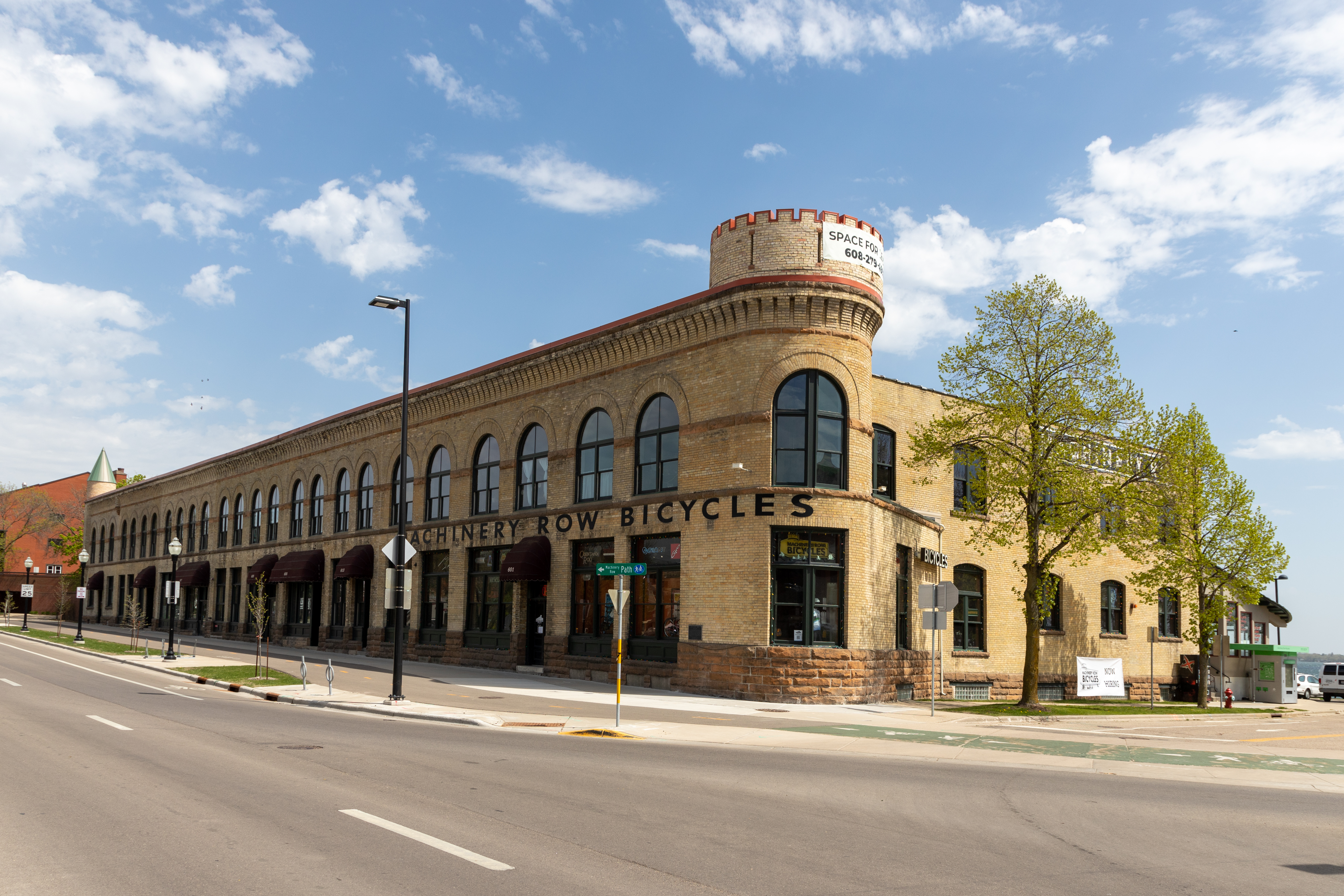
Machinery Row (1898–1912)

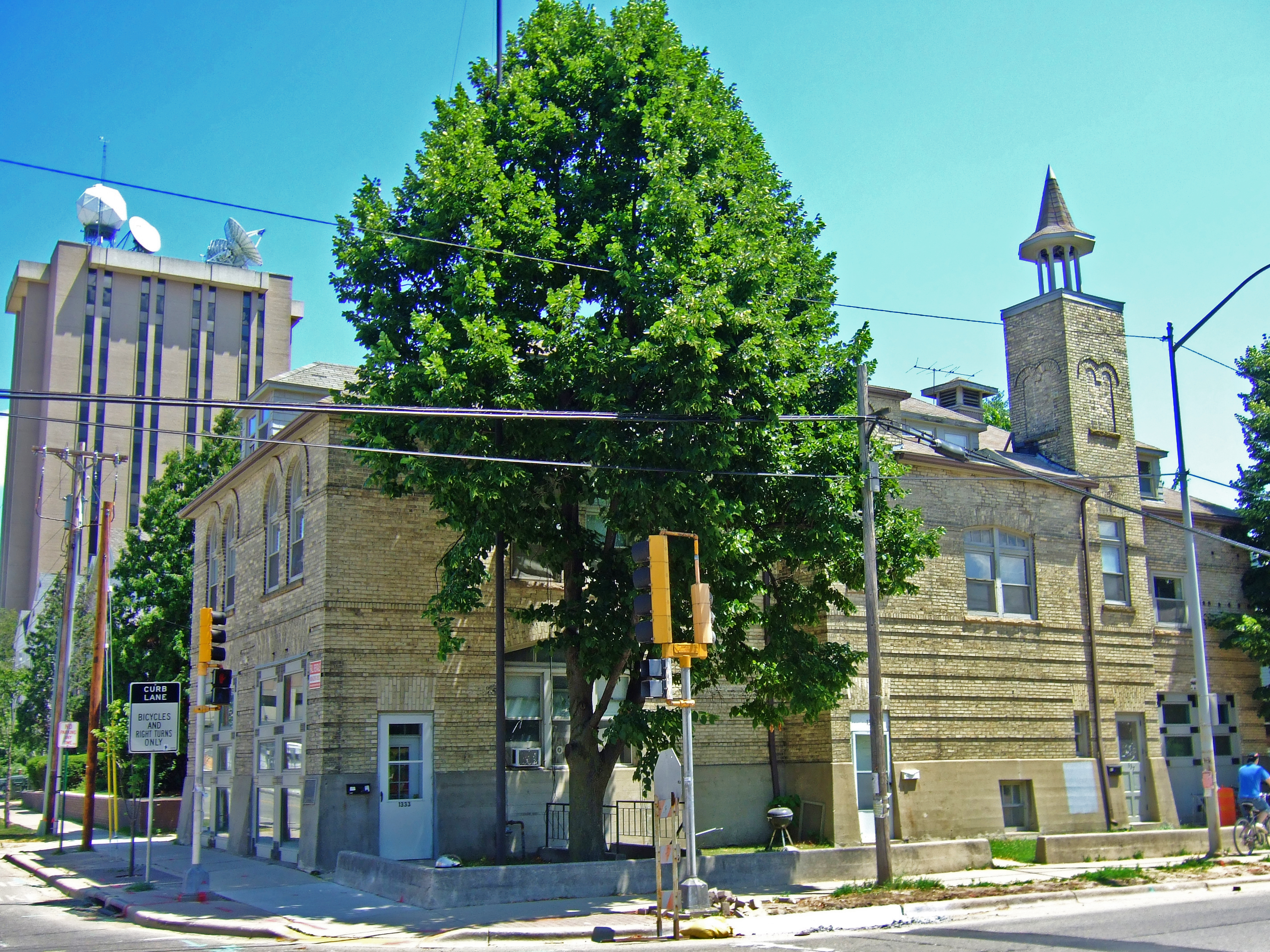
Fire Station No. 4 (1904)

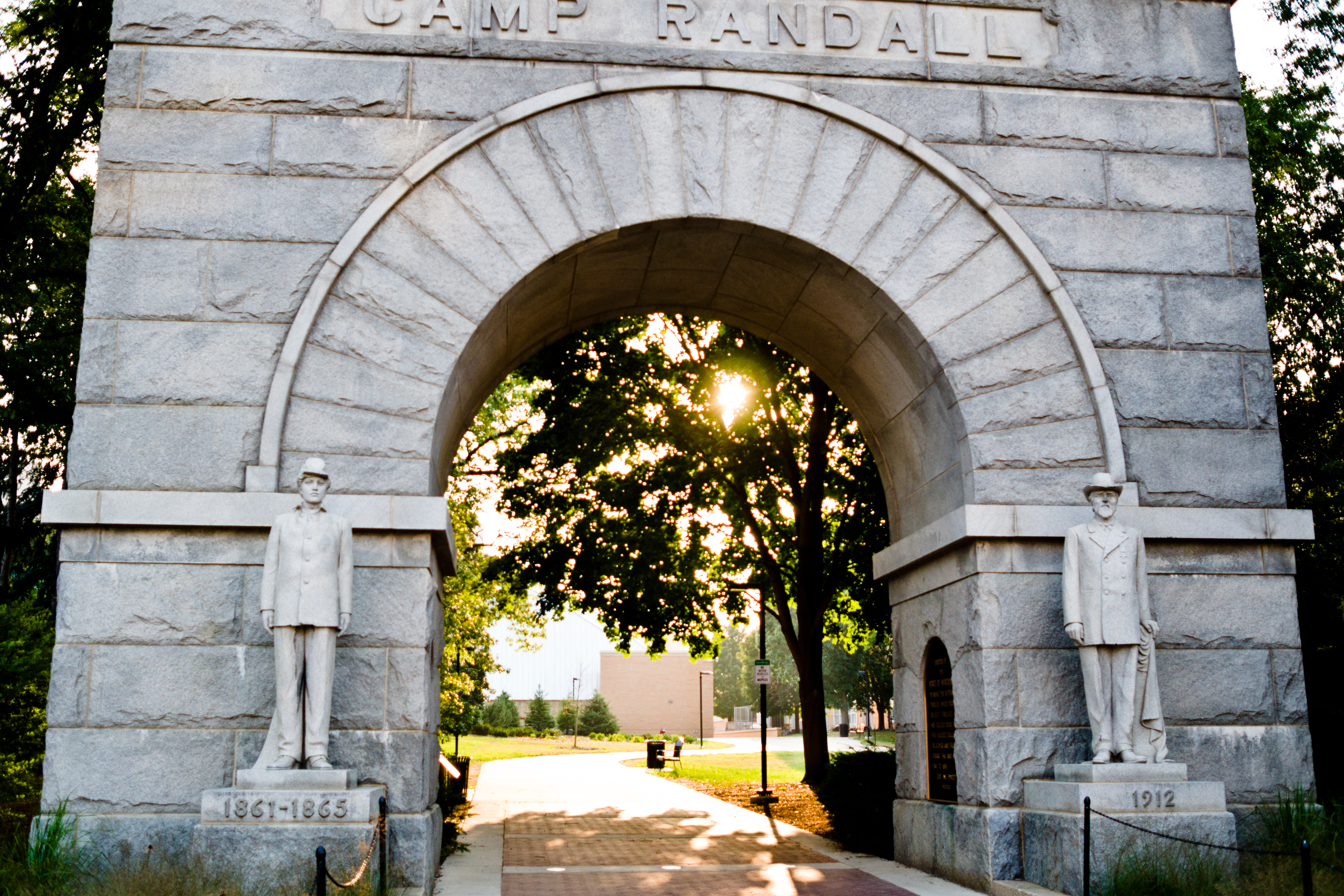
Camp Randall Memorial Arch (1912)

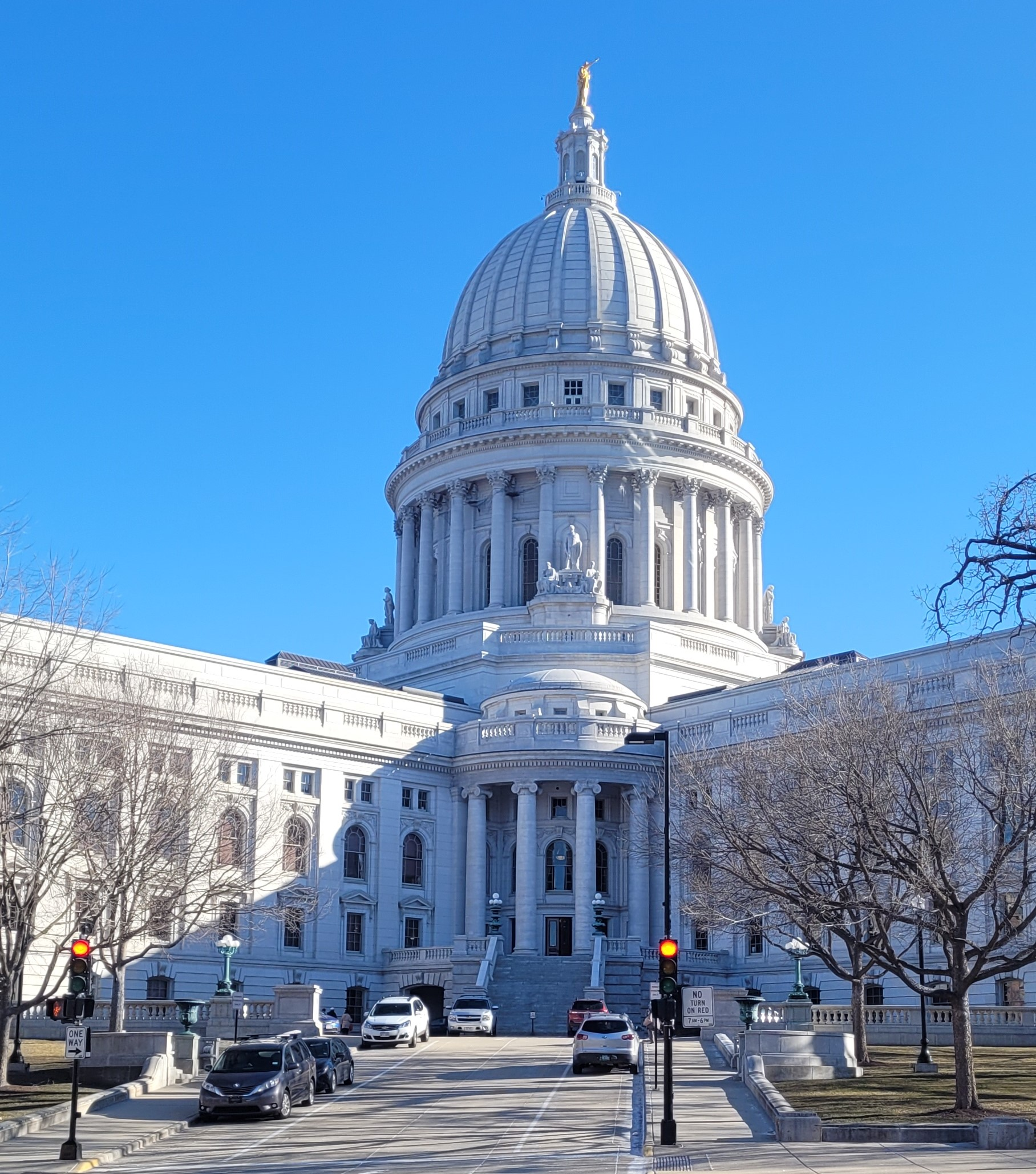
Wisconsin State Capitol (1917)
