= Randall Building =

Randall Building may refer to any of several buildings listed in the National Register of Historic Places:

in the United States (by state)

- Randall Building (Fort Wayne, Indiana)
- Randall Memorial Building, Former (Blowing Rock, North Carolina)
- Randall Building (Victoria, Texas)

== See also ==
- Randall House (disambiguation)
