= Randles circuit =

Equivalent circuit for an electrochemical reaction

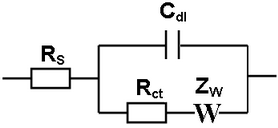
Randles circuit schematic.

In electrochemistry, a Randles circuit is an equivalent electrical circuit that consists of an active electrolyte resistance R_{S} in series with the parallel combination of the double-layer capacitance C_{dl} and an impedance (Z_{w}) of a faradaic reaction. It is commonly used in electrochemical impedance spectroscopy (EIS) for interpretation of impedance spectra, often with a constant phase element (CPE) replacing the double layer capacity. The Randles equivalent circuit is one of the simplest possible models describing processes at the electrochemical interface. In real electrochemical systems, impedance spectra are usually more complicated and, thus, the Randles circuit may not give appropriate results.

== Explanation ==
Figure 1 shows the equivalent circuit initially proposed by John Edward Brough Randles for modeling of interfacial electrochemical reactions in presence of semi-infinite linear diffusion of electroactive particles to flat electrodes. A simple model for an electrode immersed in an electrolyte is simply the series combination of the ionic resistance, R_{S}, with the double layer capacitance, C_{dl}. If a faradaic reaction is taking place then that reaction is occurring in parallel with the charging of the double layer – so the charge transfer resistance, R_{ct}, associated with the faradaic reaction is in parallel with C_{dl}. The key assumption is that the rate of the faradaic reaction is controlled by diffusion of the reactants to the electrode surface. The diffusional resistance element (the Warburg impedance, Z_{W}), is therefore in series with R_{ct}.

In this model, the impedance of a faradaic reaction consists of an active charge transfer resistance R_{ct} and a specific electrochemical element of diffusion Z_{W}, represented by a Warburg element

$$Z_\mathrm{w} = \frac{A_\mathrm{W}}{\sqrt{\omega}}+\frac{A_\mathrm{W}}{j\sqrt{\omega}},$$

where

- A_{W} is the Warburg coefficient;
- j is an imaginary unit;
- ω is the angular frequency.

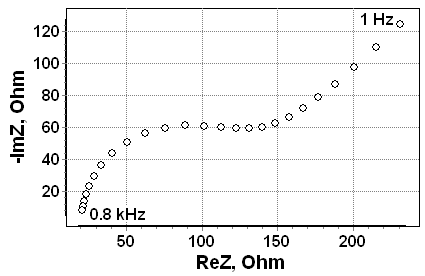
Simulated EIS spectrum of the Randles circuit.

== Identifying the Warburg element ==
In a simple situation, the Warburg element manifests itself in EIS spectra by a line with an angle of 45 degrees in the low frequency region. Figure 2 shows an example of EIS spectrum (presented in the Nyquist plot) simulated using the following parameters: R_{S} = 20 Ω, C_{dl} = 25 μF, R_{ct} = 100 Ω, A_{W} = 300 Ω•s^{−0.5}. Values of the charge transfer resistance and Warburg coefficient depend on physico-chemical parameters of a system under investigation. To obtain the Randles circuit parameters, the fitting of the model to the experimental data should be performed using complex nonlinear least-squares procedures available in numerous EIS data fitting computer programs.
