= University of Wisconsin Armory and Gymnasium =

- U.S. National Register of Historic Places
- U.S. National Historic Landmark
- U.S. Historic district – Contributing property
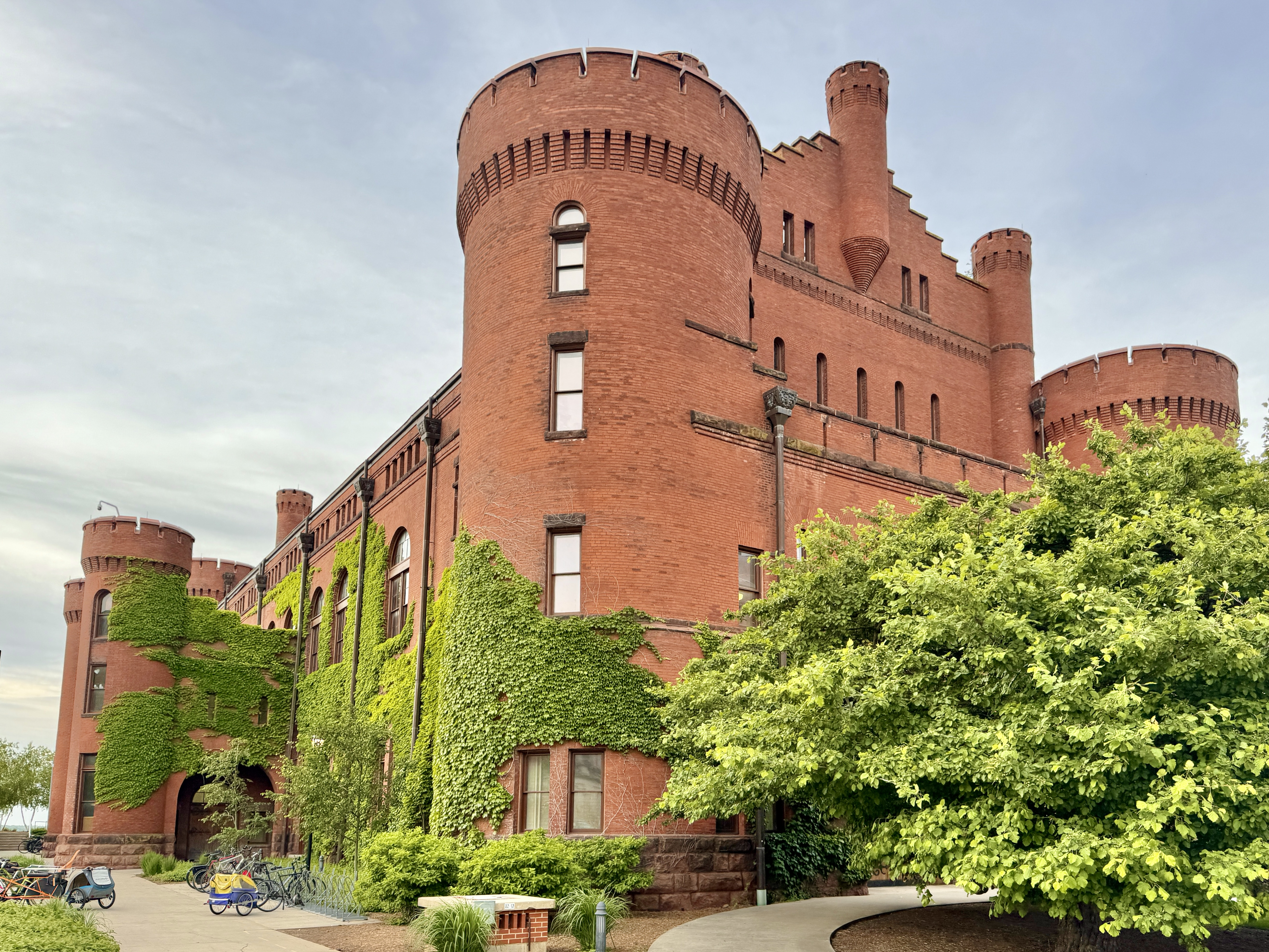
- The Red Gym in 2024

- Location within Wisconsin Location within the United States
- Location: 716 Langdon Street, Madison, Wisconsin
- Coordinates: 43°4′34.44″N 89°23′55.28″W
- Built: 1894
- Architect: Allan Conover and Lew F. Porter
- Architectural style: Romanesque Revival
- Part of: Bascom Hill Historic District (ID74000065)
- NRHP reference No.: 93001618

Significant dates
- Added to NRHP: November 4, 1993
- Designated NHL: November 4, 1993

The University of Wisconsin Armory and Gymnasium, also called the Red Gym, is a building on the campus of University of Wisconsin–Madison. It was originally used as a combination gymnasium and armory beginning in 1894. Designed in the Romanesque Revival style, it resembles a red brick castle. It is situated on the shores of Lake Mendota, overlooking Library Mall and adjacent to Memorial Union.

The 1904 Wisconsin Republican Party convention was held in the Red Gym, where Robert La Follette and the Progressive Republicans took control of the state party from the Stalwarts. The Progressives secured a majority in the state legislature, making way for reforms in Wisconsin like the direct primary, which was later adopted by other states.

== History ==
=== Background ===
In the early years after the UW was established in 1848, its students were given intermittent military training. But after the Civil War, analysts felt that the Confederacy had been helped in the war by the South's tradition of stronger military training. When the UW became a land-grant university in 1866, it was required to include military tactics in its curriculum for all male students. For that purpose and for gymnastic exercises, a small building was constructed northwest of Bascom Hall around 1870. But many students did not want military training, and after 1870 it was required only of first and second-year students. Despite that, the UW outgrew the old gym and in 1881 the Regents asked the legislature to fund a new gym. Through the following decade UW Presidents John Bascom and Thomas Chamberlin pressed for a new gymnasium and armory.

Around that time, labor riots had occurred in a number of cities in the United States, including the Haymarket riot in Chicago in 1886. Leaders in many cities saw the need for local armories to be prepared for worker strikes and uprisings. Thus, when funding the building, the Wisconsin legislature clearly saw its use by local militia. When the legislature approved the project in 1891, a delegation was sent to scout other gymnasiums. The interior of the Red Gym was likely influenced by Yale's gym at the time, with basement bowling alleys, a first floor swimming pool, and a top floor gym circled by a running track. The exterior was influenced by other armories of the day, designed like a castle with massive walls, small windows, and battlements, to instill respect and make it defensible in case a mob ever did challenge it. The 1880 Park Avenue Armory in New York is another likely precedent.

=== Design and early use ===
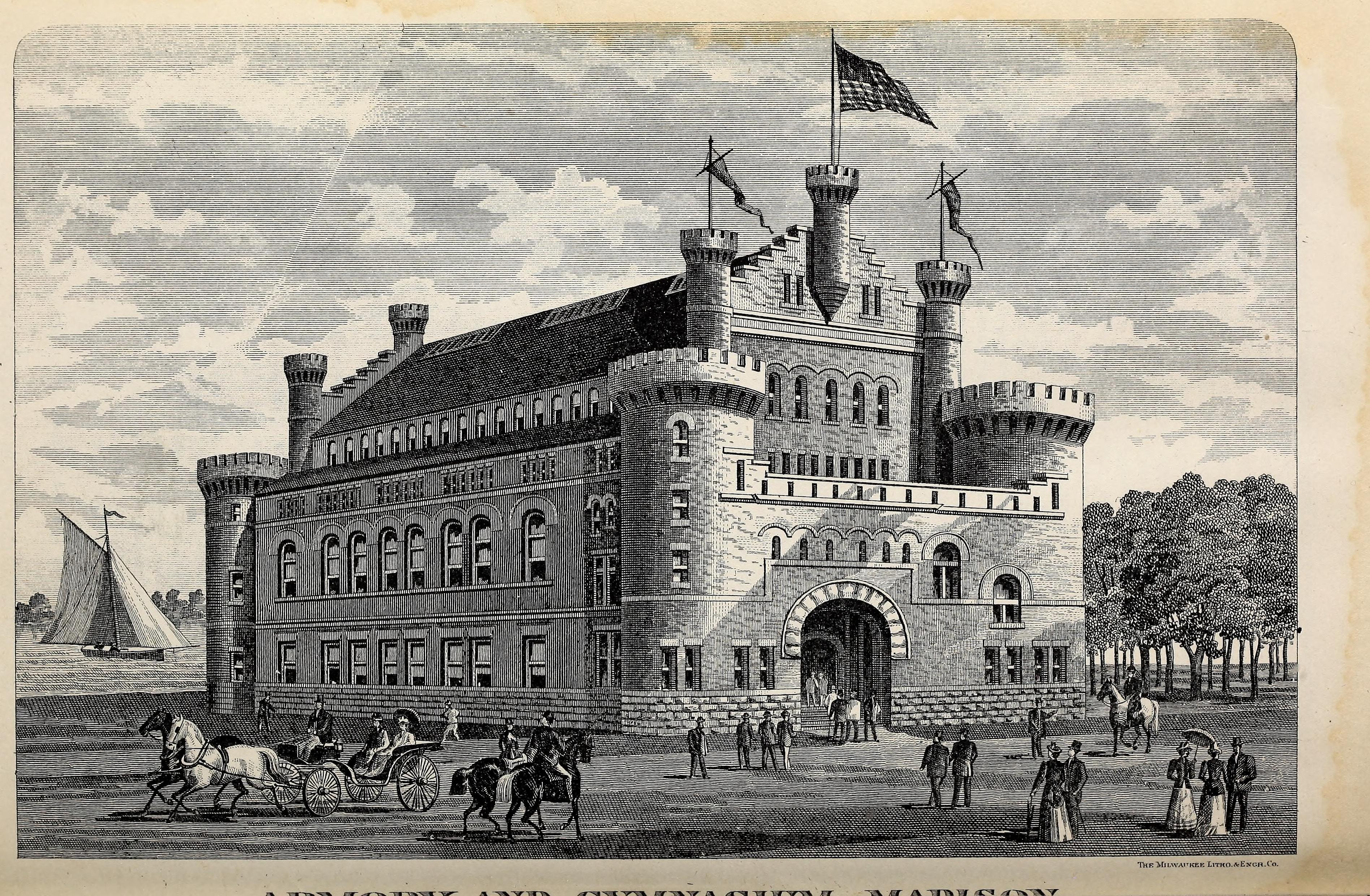
1893, after construction

The architects, Allan Conover and Lew F. Porter, designed the Red Gym with dual purposes in mind: armory and gymnasium. Modifications were made to the plans when a new university president, Charles Adams, insisted that the second floor be capable of accommodating large assemblies. Construction began in fall 1892, with T.C. McCarthy as general contractor, and was completed in September 1894. As originally constructed, the first floor held military offices, an artillery drill room, bowling alleys, a locker room, and a swimming tank. The second floor contained a drill hall wide enough to permit a four-column battalion which could also be used for assemblies. The third floor was occupied by the gymnasium, which contained a baseball cage, gymnastic apparatus, and rowing machines. Two rifle ranges and a running track were on a level a few steps lower than the gym.

Once complete, the second floor assembly hall was used for many purposes. The university held large dances and banquets there, and there students followed the progress of away football games which were manually plotted on a "gridograph" in the days before television. It was the scene of speeches by William McKinley, William Jennings Bryan, Eugene V. Debs, and Upton Sinclair, who promised not to be controversial. The Red Gym hosted the Republican state conventions of 1902 and 1904.

=== Republican convention of 1904 ===
In the late 1800s wealthy businessmen used their influence with politicians to benefit themselves at the expense of the general public; e.g. railroads charged high shipping rates to farmers and small businesses. In response, a movement arose aiming to make government serve the public rather than corporations when their interests conflicted. This wing of the Republican Party was called the Progressive movement, and for a time it was led by Robert M. La Follette. The Progressive Republicans were opposed by the Stalwart Republicans—conservatives allied with big business. In 1900 La Follete ran for governor, calling for limiting railroad shipping rates, abolition of railroad tax breaks, and direct primaries. La Follette won, but the Stalwart Republicans retained control of the state senate, resisting his reforms.

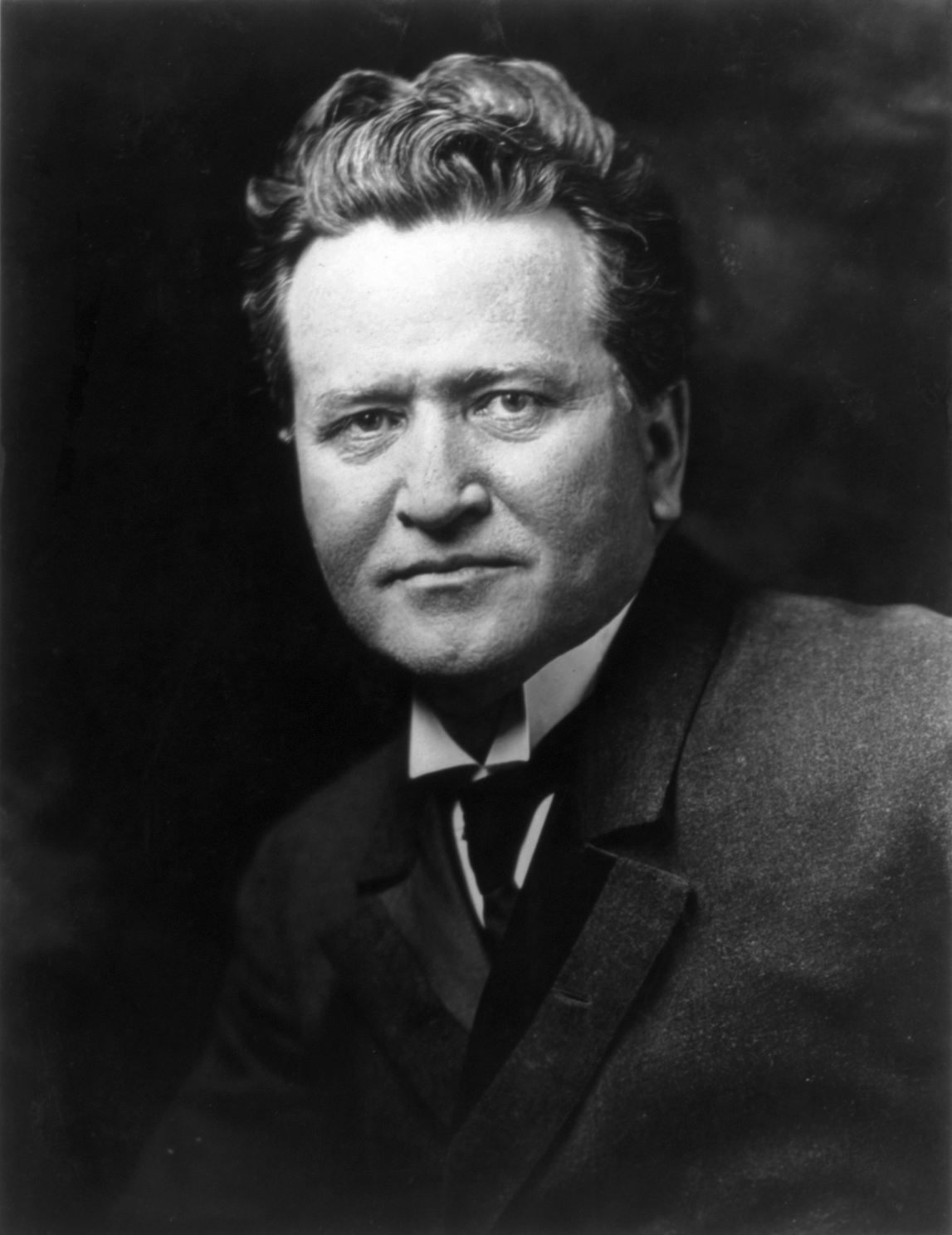
Robert La Follette Sr., 1904

In the 1904 election, Progressives and Stalwarts fiercely contested Wisconsin's Republican caucuses, and in some districts the choice of delegates for the state convention ended up unclear. Those cases had to be sorted out by the party's State Central Committee. That committee, composed of both Progressives and Stalwarts, met in the Armory the day before the convention and decided unanimously to award the majority of convention seats to Progressive delegates. In response, the Stalwarts met at the Fuller Opera House, denounced the Central Committee, and planned to march their delegates to the Armory and demand to be seated.

The next day at the convention, the Progressives were prepared. Delegates were required to enter the Armory up the west staircase to the assembly hall, through a narrow passage lined with barbed wire that forced them into single file. Their entrance was guarded by UW football players and wrestlers who made sure that each delegate had an admission ticket countersiged by the State Central Committee. Spectators were also allowed in, but they entered through the main entrance. Spectators also had to show a signed entry ticket to athlete guards. They were admitted to the second floor assembly hall, but to a separate section from the delegates, with the two sections divided by a four and a half foot wire partition. The Stalwarts formally objected to this admission arrangement, arguing that the county party officials should control who was seated - not the State Central Committee. But the chairman of the convention denied their motion. The Stalwarts stomped out, to meet next day at the Opera House. There they decided to contest the legitimacy of the convention in court, and selected their own candidates and their own delegates for the Republican national convention.

The "gymnasium convention" nominated La Follette for a third term as governor, and selected slates of candidates and delegates to the Republican national convention. Just before the 1904 election, Wisconsin's Supreme Court ruled that the gymnasium convention was legitimate. The Progressive candidates enough elections to take control of the state legislature. That legislature passed some of the Progressive's major reforms: oversight of the railroads, limits on special-interest lobbying, and a civil service law. The NRHP nomination describes perhaps the biggest result:

In addition, comprehensive direct primaries, La Follette's principal platform plank, was passed in referendum in November 1904. With this law, Wisconsin became the first state in the nation in which the people directly elected all candidates for public office. Optional and piecemeal primaries already existed in a few states, but this marked the first time that a comprehensive statewide system was put in place. The institution of direct primaries and the reforms enacted by the 1905 legislature established Wisconsin as the national model of the Progressive Movement."

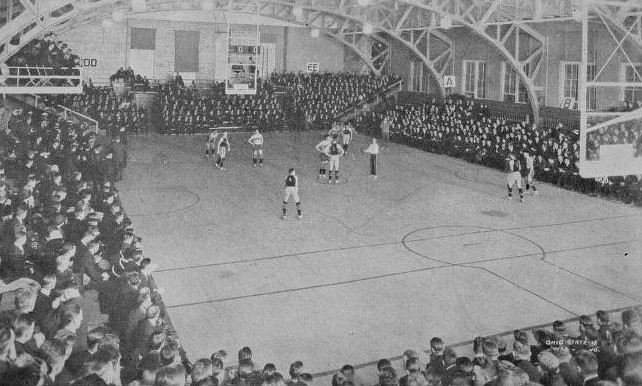
Men's basketball against Ohio State University in 1916

=== Later history ===
The anti-military sentiment in Wisconsin that occurred after World War I resulted in the elimination of compulsory military training. The Red Gym was also no longer used for Big Ten basketball games following the construction of the university field house in 1930. In the 1930s and 1940s, much of the first and second floors was partitioned into offices. With diminishing use of the building after World War II, plans were made to demolish it; however, popular sentiment delayed those plans. When a new gym was constructed on the west end of campus in 1963, the building was again slated for demolition, and again received a reprieve. In the 1960s, it once again saw military use as ROTC headquarters. A firebomb aimed at the building by anti-war protesters in 1970 resulted in severe damage, which was repaired. Since then, the building has seen various administrative uses; it currently houses student services-related offices and centers.

The University of Wisconsin Armory and Gymnasium was declared a National Historic Landmark in 1993, considered significant at the national level for hosting the 1904 Wisconsin Republican Convention, which was "a seminal event in the history of the Progressive Movement..." which "...directly or indirectly affected every institution and every person in the United States."

== Gallery ==
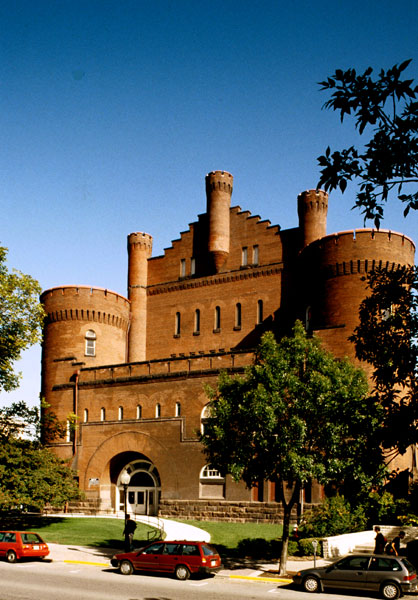

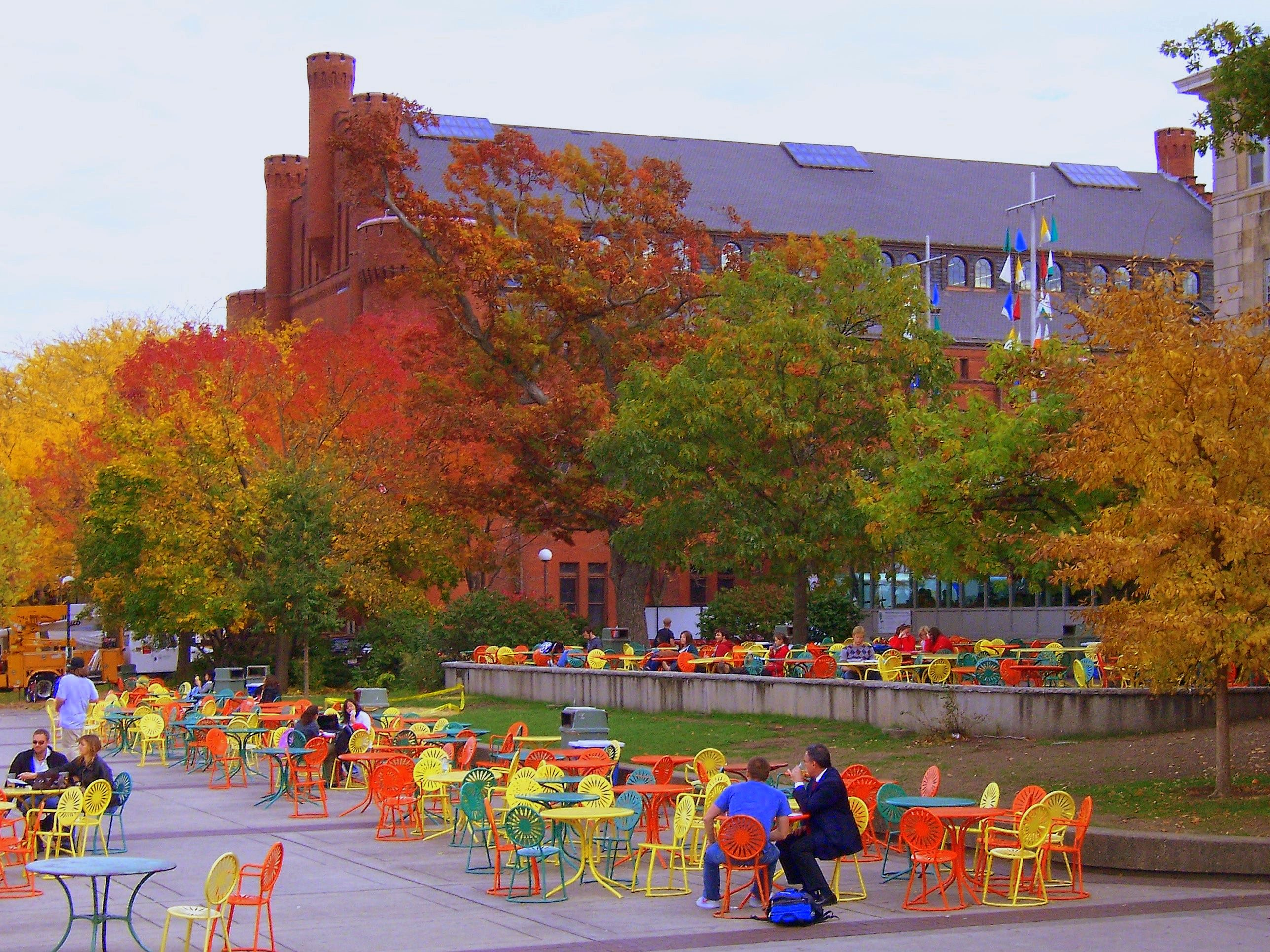
The Red Gym seen from the Memorial Union Terrace, 2008

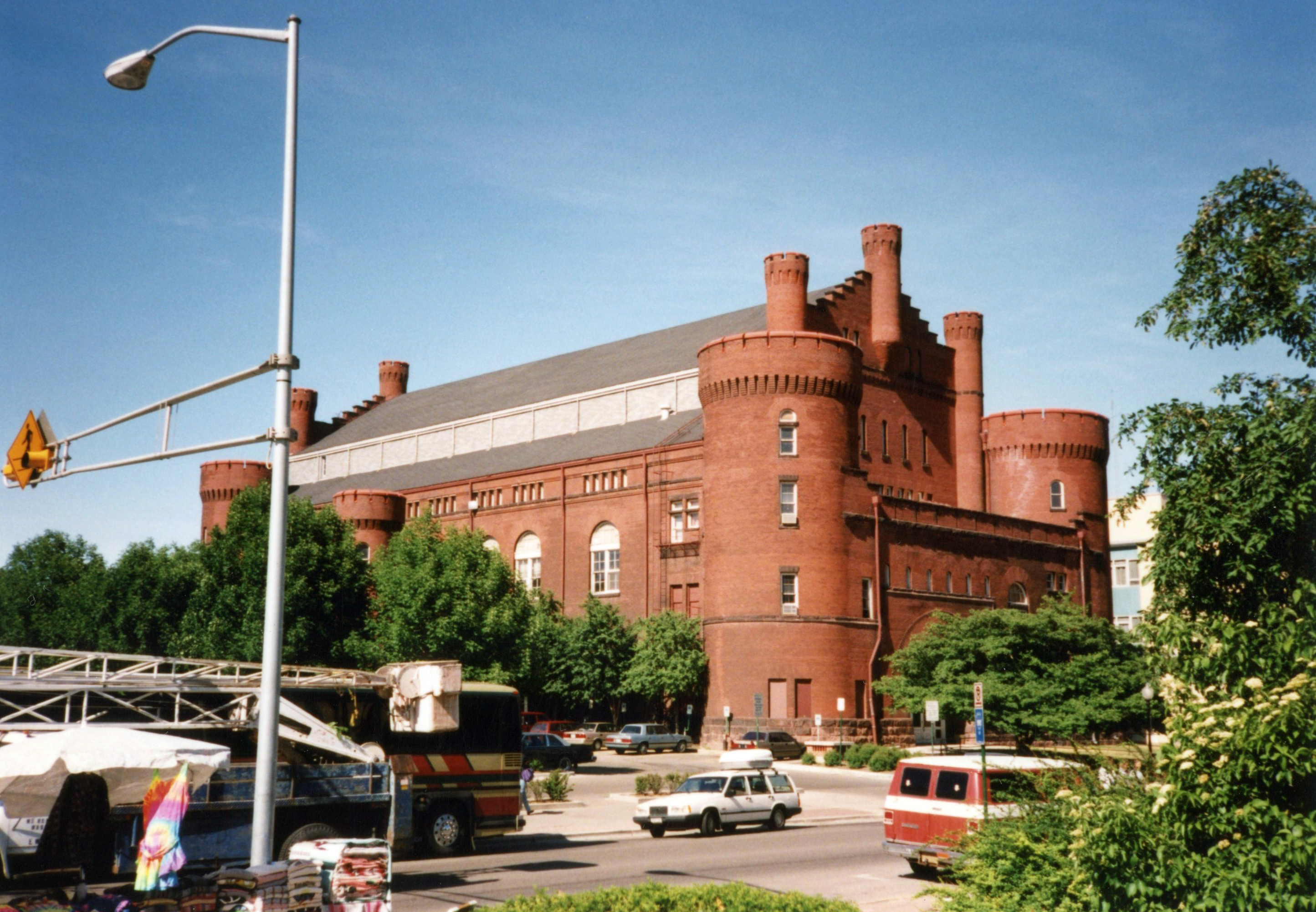
Armory, 1993

== See also ==
- List of National Historic Landmarks in Wisconsin
- National Register of Historic Places listings in Madison, Wisconsin
