= Camp Randall =

- U.S. National Register of Historic Places
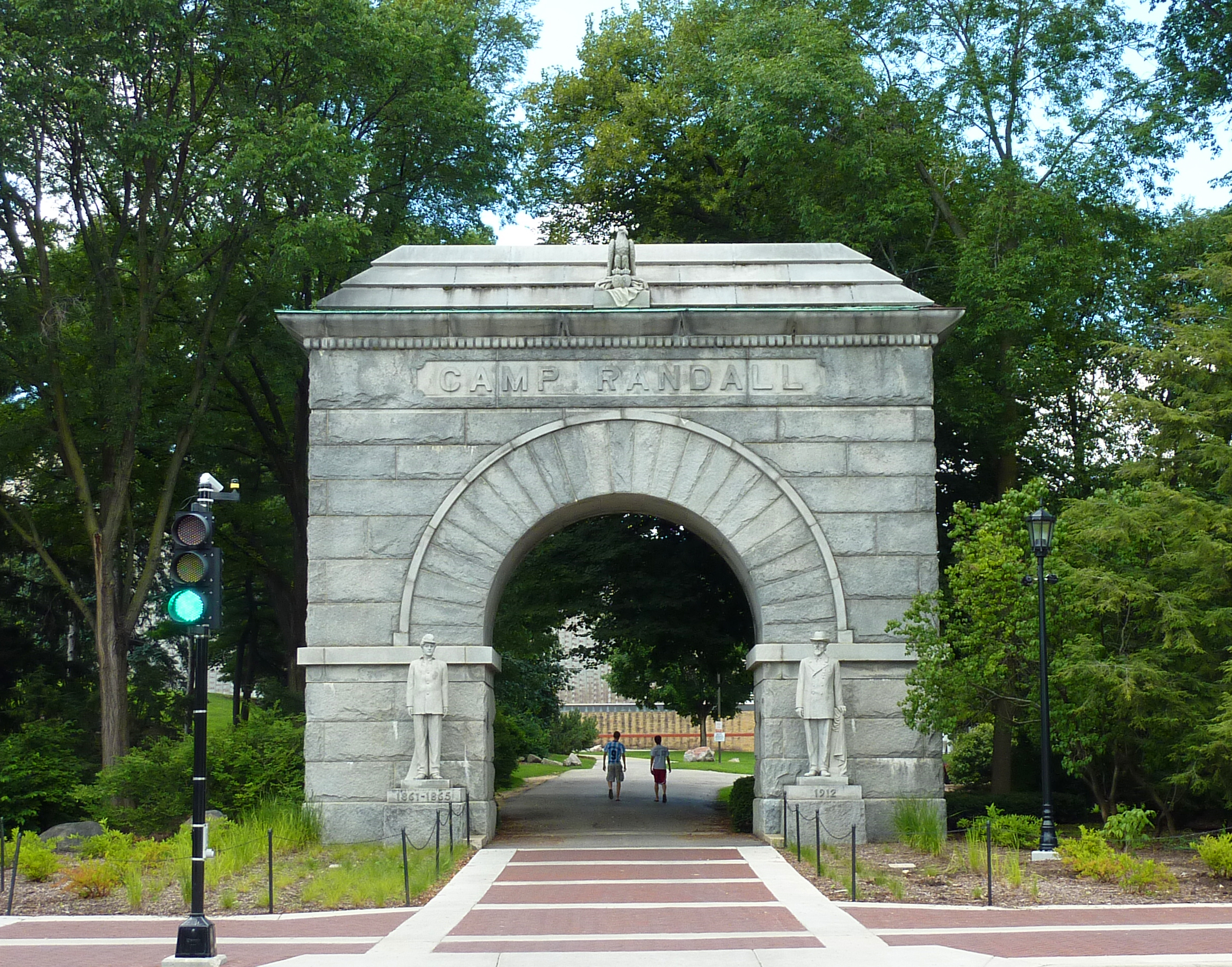
- Camp Randall arch designed by Lew F. Porter

- Location within Wisconsin Location within the United States
- Location: Camp Randall Memorial Park, Madison, Wisconsin
- Coordinates: 43°4′11″N 89°24′34″W
- Area: 5 acres (2.0 ha)
- Built: 1861
- NRHP reference No.: 71000036
- Added to NRHP: June 7, 1971

Camp Randall was a United States Army base in Madison, Wisconsin, the largest staging point for Wisconsin troops entering the American Civil War. At this camp, fresh volunteers received quick training before heading off to join the Union Army. Also located on the grounds were a hospital and briefly a prisoner-of-war camp for captured Confederate soldiers.

Today, the camp's land is split between UW athletic buildings including Camp Randall Stadium, the College of Engineering, and Camp Randall Memorial Park with its historic and memorial displays. In 1971 the Memorial Park section was placed on the National Register of Historic Places, considered "the single most important site in Wisconsin relating to the state's participation in the Civil War."

== Training/Mustering camp ==
When the Civil War broke out after the fall of Fort Sumter in April 1861, President Lincoln called for troops from the state militias to put down the rebellion. He initially asked Wisconsin for one regiment of 780 men for three months. Wisconsin Governor Alexander Randall, a strong abolitionist, promptly pledged that first regiment to the Union cause, and more to come. The first regiment of volunteers organized at Camp Scott in Milwaukee. The second regiment organized in Madison, and Camp Randall was rapidly established for them, with recruits already there by May 1. Subsequent regiments assembled at Fond du Lac, Racine, and other places, but the majority ended up mustering at Camp Randall - 70,000 of the 91,000 who served from Wisconsin over the course of the war.

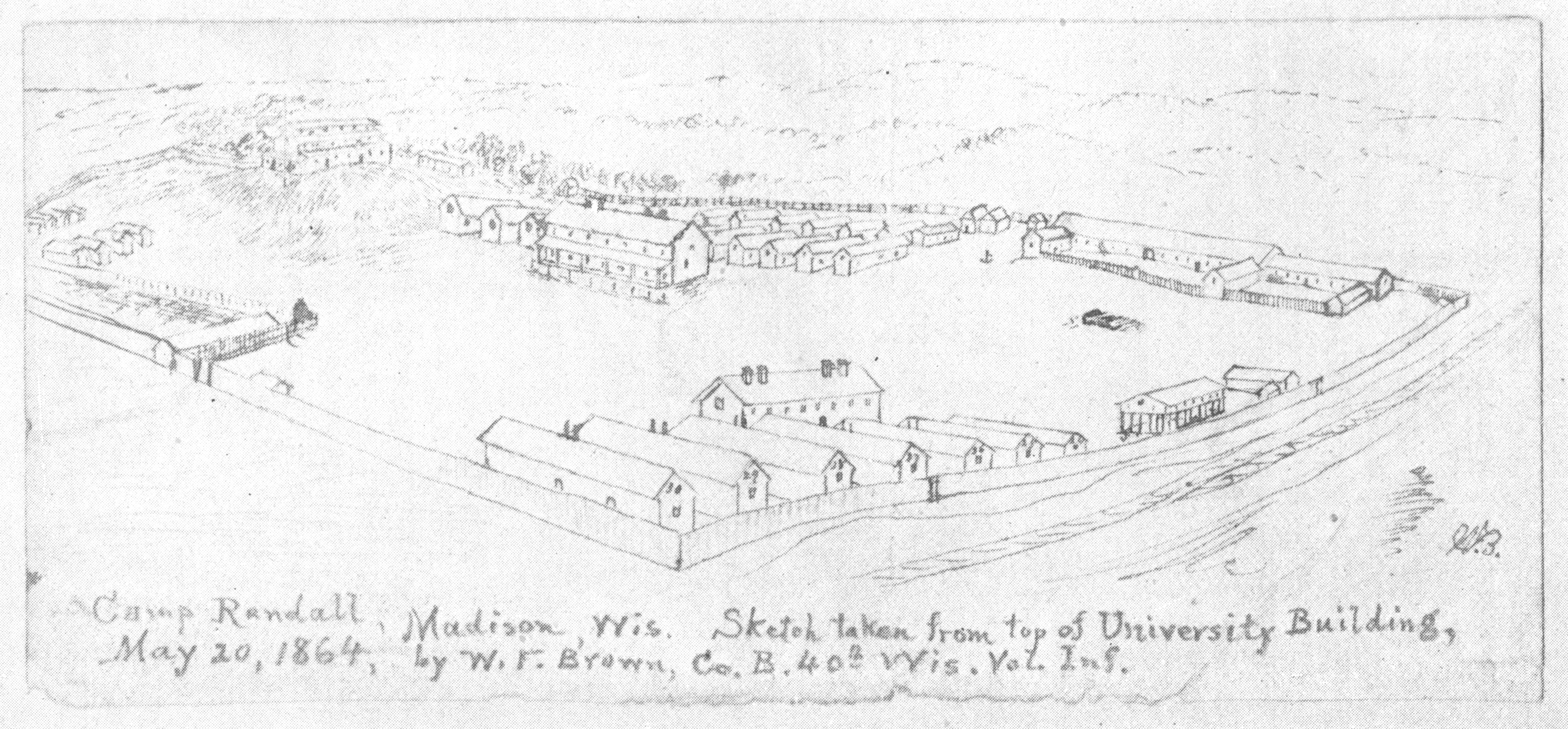
Camp Randall during the Civil War. Sketch made from top of University Building, May 20, 1864, by W. F. Brown, Company B, 40th Wisconsin Volunteer Infantry Regiment

Just a few years before the war, in 1858 and 1860, the camp's flat open area on what was then the west side of Madison had hosted the Wisconsin State Fair. With the outbreak of war, the Wisconsin Agricultural Society provided its fairground to be used as a training camp. Some of the new recruits bunked in what had been the State Fair's cattle sheds, while others lived in tents. The fair's machinery exhibit building was converted to a mess hall that could feed 3,000 men at a time. And the fair's Floral Hall held the hospital and officers' quarters. Some fair sheds housed cavalry animals, and other buildings were constructed. 45 barracks buildings were each 80 by 20 feet, with bunks three high, each housing up to 100 men. An eight foot fence surrounded the 10-acre camp, with two manned gates. One of those gates was where the Memorial Arch stands now.

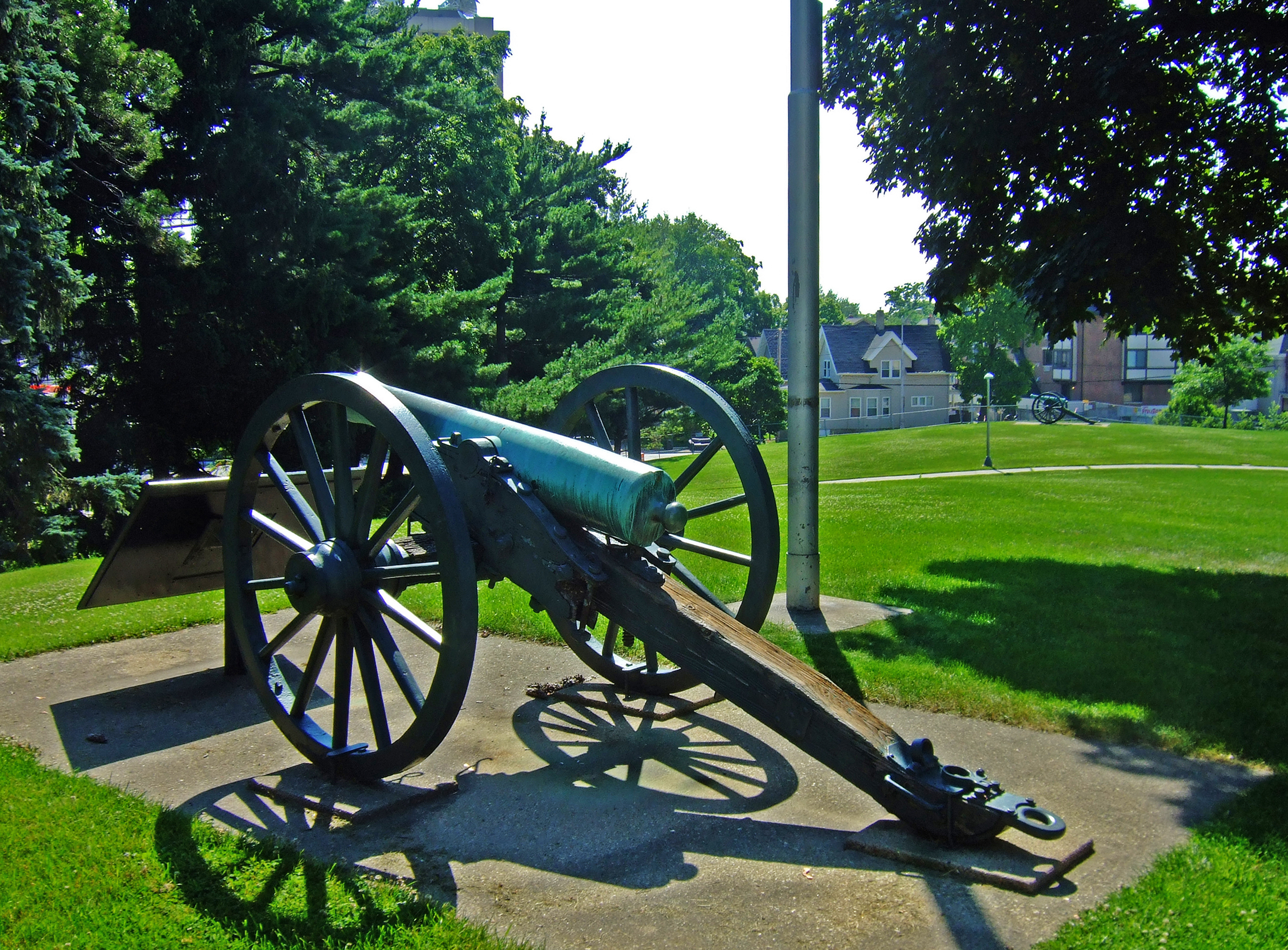

The typical recruits' day at Camp Randall began at 5am with a cannon shot that woke thousands. The men had volunteered from around the state, arriving in companies of 100. Each company typically came from one region - students and young businessmen from Madison, farm-boys from Delton, lumberjacks from Eau Claire, etc. Ten companies formed each regiment of a thousand recruits. The camp could handle several regiments at once. The recruits' mornings and afternoons were largely spent drilling - learning marching, muskets, cooking in the field, and discipline. Most of the recruits were young unmarried fellows, seventeen to twenty-one years old, with no military experience. In some cases older veterans of the Mexican War or European wars ran the drills for the green recruits. Once the recruits had uniforms, a dress parade was common in the evening, sometimes admired by visitors from town. Later in the candle-lit barracks men played cards, told stories, sang, read newspapers, and read letters from home.

A company from Eau Claire bought a young bald eagle on their way to Camp Randall, and he became Old Abe, the famous mascot of the 8th Wisconsin Infantry Regiment. Less well-known, a pet black bear named Bruin came along to Camp Randall with Harlan Squires, a 16-year-old recruit from Delton. Bruin became a mascot and pet of the 12th Regiment. They built him a shelter at Camp Randall and a 12-foot post to climb while they trained.

But not all was noble, orderly, and whimsical. Soldiers wrote home complaining of fleas in their straw bedding, of cold guard duty in January, and of getting sick from being fed spoiled beef. Some caused a ruckus in town while out on pass. Some spent their idle time drinking and gambling. Some even spent time locked in the guardhouse.

Training for a regiment lasted "from a few weeks to two months or more." When training finished and the early regiments left for duty, they were celebrated with speeches from notables, brass bands, church bells, and large crowds. As the war dragged on, the send-off celebrations for later regiments continued, but became less elaborate.

The units that mustered at Camp Randall fought in important battles of the war, including the First Battle of Bull Run, Antietam, Gettysburg, and the Wilderness campaign, and many gave their lives. Fresh replacement troops to fill in for soldiers lost or discharged were also trained at Camp Randall. As surviving Wisconsin soldiers completed their tours, which were now three years, most of the troops that trained at Camp Randall returned there for mustering out.

== Prison camp ==
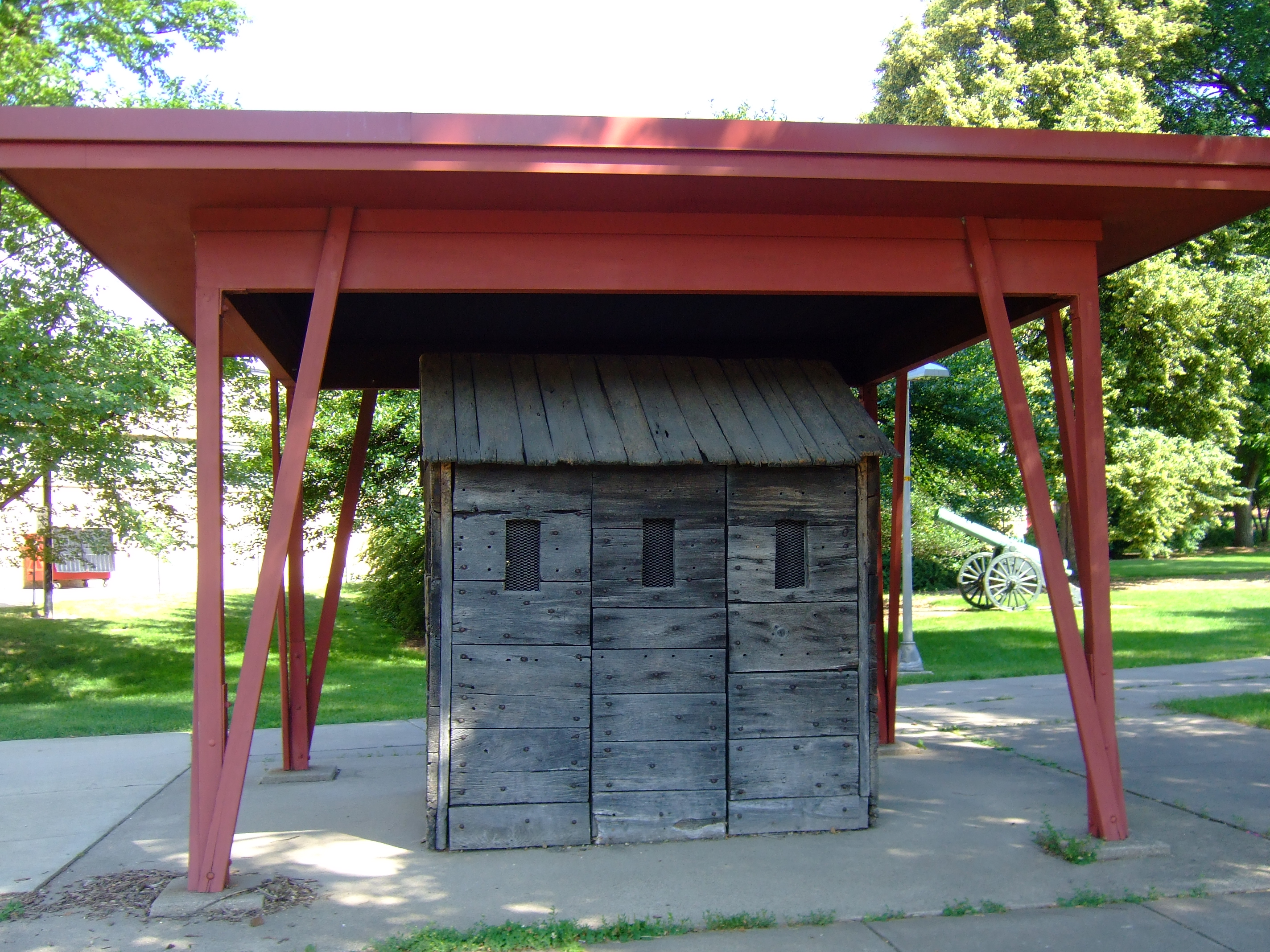
Guard house under protective roof

In April 1862, Union forces captured thousands of Confederate soldiers at Island No. 10 on the Mississippi River in southern Missouri. About 1200 of them were sent to Camp Randall - mostly from the 1st Alabama Infantry Regiment, along with some from Tennessee, Arkansas, and other places. Some had been injured or sick to begin with, and all suffered an eight-day ride on an overcrowded boat up the Mississippi. A rough barracks was set up for the prisoners and the 19th Regiment was sent over from Racine to guard them.

Conditions in camp were generally decent for a Civil War POW stockade, but not good. The army scrimped on rations, prisoners fought each other, there was antagonism between prisoners and guards, the hospital was overloaded so that sick prisoners lay on the floor, and prisoners died at an alarming rate. The camp didn't have a good fence, so some healthy prisoners just walked out. Because of the poor infrastructure and spotty discipline, it took half of the 19th Regiment to guard the thousand prisoners - Union soldiers who were needed elsewhere. So on May 30, all the healthy-enough POWs were shipped by train to Camp Douglas in Chicago. Some sick POWs remained, gradually transferring out or dying over the next few months. By the end, 138 of 1200 prisoners had died over the course of a few months. The prisoners who died at Camp Randall were buried in a mass grave at Forest Hill Cemetery, commemorated at Confederate Rest.

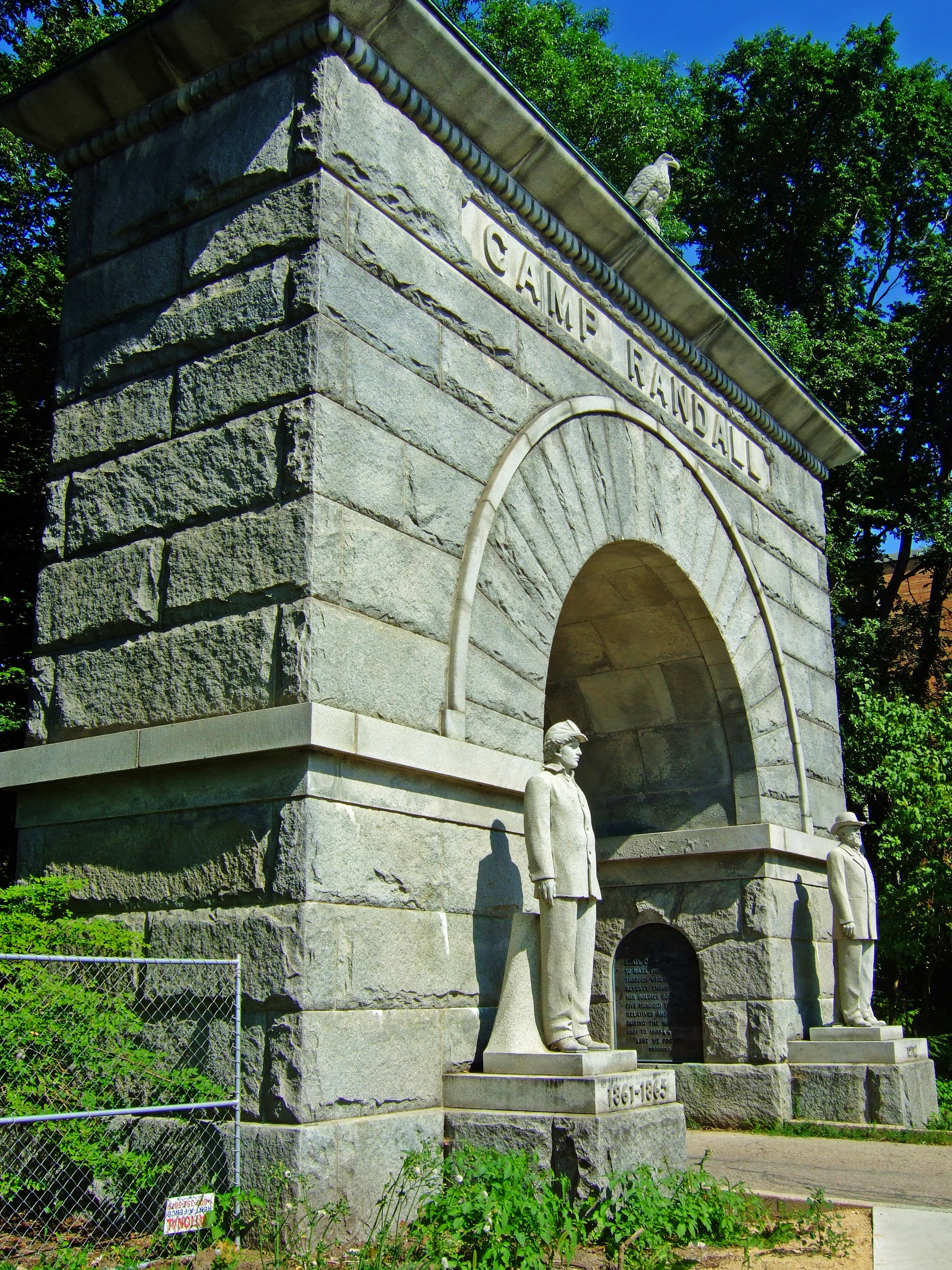
The Camp Randall Arch, topped by a statue of the eagle Old Abe

== Since the war ==
After the war the army camp was deactivated and its open area was used intermittently for the Barnum circus and the Dane County Fair, until that fair moved to a different site. There was talk of splitting the parcel into city lots to sell, but the Civil War veterans who had trained there objected. The site was purchased by the state of Wisconsin in 1893 and deeded to the University of Wisconsin. Football play began there in 1895.

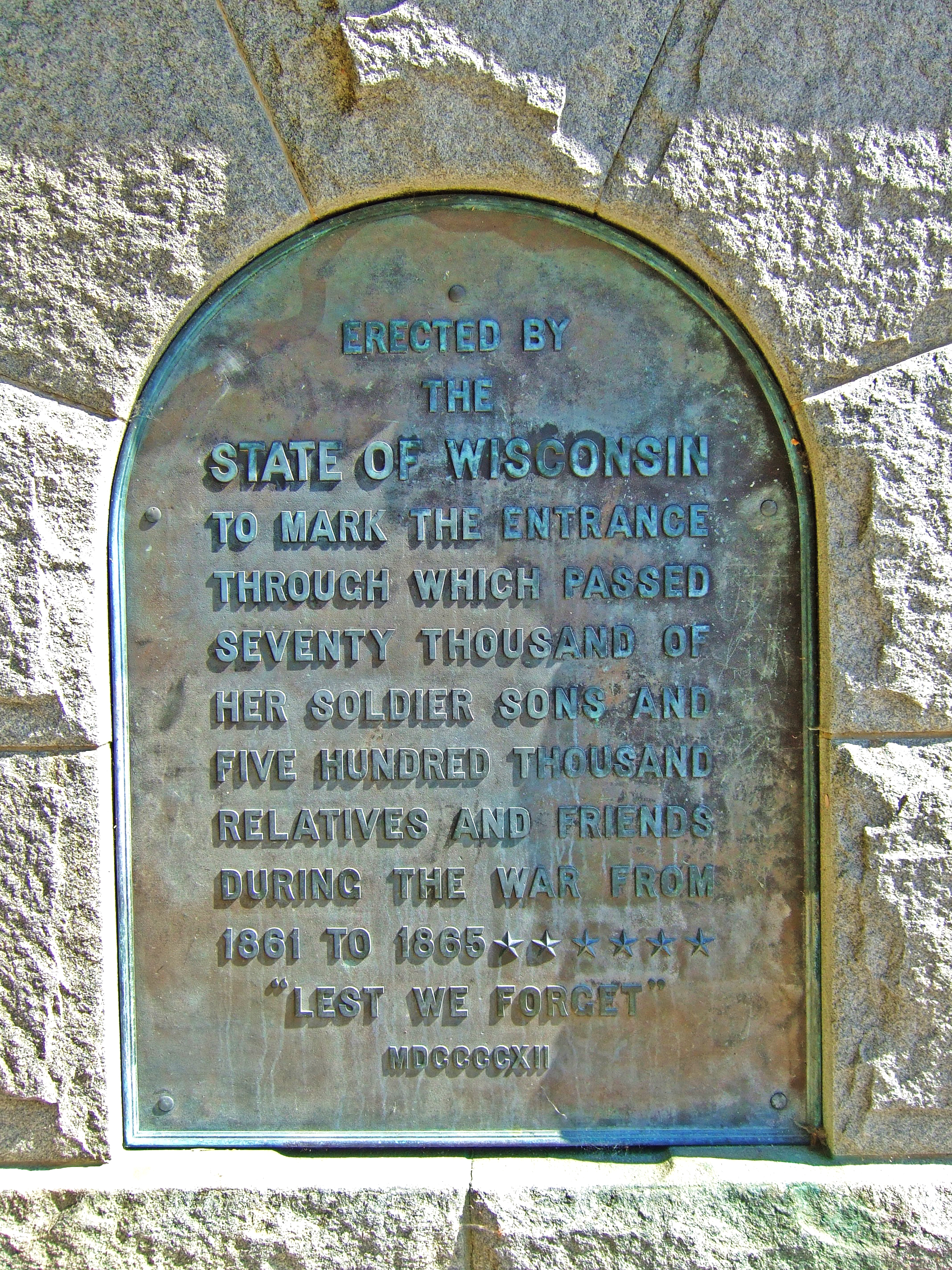

Of the original 53½ acres, a segment was set aside as Camp Randall Park in 1911. The Memorial Arch was added in 1912, fifty years after the war, located where one of the camp's gates stood, where soldiers would have entered and left. It was designed by Lew F. Porter, with a statue on the left of a young Civil War recruit, and a statue on the right of an aging Civil War veteran in 1912. The arch is topped with a statue of the mascot eagle Old Abe.

Another portion was used for Camp Randall Stadium, begun in 1916 as an outdoor football stadium for the university and expanded many times since. The UW Field House was added on the original property in 1930.

In 1971 Camp Randall Memorial Park was listed on the National Register of Historic Places as "the site most significantly associated with Wisconsin's participation in the Civil War." The plaque under Memorial Arch reads:

Erected by
the
STATE OF WISCONSIN
to mark the entrance
through which passed
seventy thousand of
her soldier sons and
five hundred thousand
relatives and friends
during the war from
1861 to 1865
"Lest we forget"
MDCCCCXII
