= Randle =

Randle, as a surname or a given name, may refer to:

== Surname ==
- Betsy Randle (born 1955), American actress
- Bill Randle (1923–2004), American disc jockey, lawyer and university professor
- Brian Randle (born 1985), American NBA coach and basketball player in the Israeli Basketball Premier League
- Chasson Randle (born 1993), American college basketball player
- Ervin Randle (born 1962), National Football League linebacker and brother of John Randle
- Florence Randle (fl. c. 1937), American photographer
- Frank Randle (1901–1957), English comedian
- Harry Randle (1906–1976), English footballer
- Ian Randle (born 1940), Jamaican publisher
- Jack Randle (1902–1990), English footballer
- Jerome Randle (born 1987), American college and professional basketball player
- John Randle (born 1967), retired National Football League defensive tackle and member of the Pro Football Hall of Fame
- John Randle (physician) (1855–1928), West African doctor active in politics in Lagos, now in Nigeria, in the colonial era
- John Niel Randle (1917–1944), British captain and posthumous recipient of the Victoria Cross
- Joseph Randle (born 1991), National Football League running back
- Julius Randle (born 1994), American basketball player
- Kevin D. Randle (born 1949), American ufologist
- Lenny Randle (1949–2024), American Major League Baseball player
- Lynda Randle (born 1962), African-American singer of southern gospel
- Mary Jo Randle (born 1954), English actress
- Michael Randle (born 1933), British peace activist who helped Soviet spy George Blake escape from prison
- Philip Randle (1926–2006), medical researcher
- Rodger Randle (born 1943), American politician
- Roger Randle (born 1974), New Zealand rugby union footballer
- Rueben Randle (born 1991), National Football League wide receiver
- Sonny Randle (1936–2017), sportscaster and former National Football League player and college coach
- Tate Randle (born 1959), retired National Football League cornerback
- Theresa Randle (born 1964), American actress
- Valerie Randle (born 1953), Welsh materials engineer and professor at Swansea University
- Vicki Randle (born 1954), American singer, musician and composer; first and only female member of The Tonight Show Band

== Given name ==
- Randle Ayrton (1869–1940), British actor, producer and director
- Randle Chowning (born 1950), American singer-songwriter best known as the founder of the Ozark Mountain Daredevils
- Randle Cotgrave (died 1634?), English lexicographer
- Randle Wilbraham Falconer (1816–1881), British medical doctor and writer
- Randle Holme, name shared by four family members who were painters and genealogists in Chester, Cheshire, England, from the late 16th to early 18th centuries

== Fictional characters ==
- Randle McMurphy, protagonist of Ken Kesey's novel One Flew Over the Cuckoo's Nest and its film adaptation
- John Randle, in the 1993 horror anthology film Body Bags

== See also ==
- Randles, a list of people with the surname
